= 140s BC =

Decade

This article concerns the period 149 BC – 140 BC.

== Events ==
=== 149 BC ===
==== By place ====
====== Roman Republic ======
- The Third Punic War begins. The Romans land an army in Africa to begin the Battle of Carthage.
- Servius Sulpicius Galba is prosecuted for corruption while serving in Spain, but is acquitted after he parades his weeping family members before the tribunal.
- Lucius Calpurnius Piso passes the lex Calpurnia de repetundis which establishes the first permanent criminal court in Rome.
- The turmoil in Spain escalates again with the renewal of the Lusitanian War, under the leadership of Viriathus, and the Celtiberian War.

====== Macedon ======
- Andriscus, the last king of Macedon, ascends to the throne.

====== Bithynia ======
- With Roman help, Nicomedes II overthrows his father Prusias II as king of Bithynia.

=== 148 BC ===
==== By place ====
====== Ireland ======
- Corlea Trackway built in County Longford

====== Roman Republic ======
- With the defeat of Andriscus in the Battle of Pydna by Quintus Caecilius Metellus Macedonicus, Macedon is reorganized as a Roman province by 146 BC.
- Construction of the Via Postumia, linking Aquileia and Genua.
- Publius Cornelius Scipio Aemilianus divides Numidia among the three sons of the recently deceased Masinissa.

=== 147 BC ===
==== By place ====
====== Ireland ======
- Corlea Trackway completed.

====== Roman Republic ======
- Scipio Aemilianus takes command of the Siege of Carthage.
- In Lusitania, Hispania, the Celtic king Viriathus, rallies Lusitanian resistance to Rome.

====== Syria ======
- Demetrius II of Syria returns to Syria (approximate date).
- Jonathan Maccabaeus conquers Joppa.

====== Greece ======
- Macedonia becomes a part of the Roman Empire.

=== 146 BC ===
==== By place ====
====== Roman Republic ======
- Roman armies destroy Carthage and Corinth.

====== Africa ======
- Spring – Carthage falls to Roman forces under Scipio Aemilianus and the city is completely destroyed. End of the Third Punic War.

====== Greece ======
- Achaean War: The Romans conquer the Achaean League and southern Greece becomes a Roman province.

- Battle of Scarpheia: The Romans led by Quintus Caecilius Metellus Macedonicus defeat an Achaean League force under Critolaus
- Battle of Corinth: The Romans under Lucius Mummius defeat the Achaean League near Corinth. Corinth is destroyed, and the Achaean League dissolved.

==== By topic ====
====== Astronomy ======
- Hipparchus determines the equinoctial point.

=== 145 BC ===
==== By place ====
====== Syria ======
- In the Battle of Antioch, Ptolemy VI Philometor defeats the Seleucid usurper Alexander Balas, but dies in the battle.

====== Egypt ======
- Ptolemy VII becomes king of Egypt briefly, then is assassinated by Ptolemy VIII the following year.

==== By topic ====
====== Astronomy ======
- Hipparchus determines the length of the tropical year.

=== 144 BC ===
==== By place ====
====== Roman Republic ======
- Quintus Marcius Rex starts construction of the Aqua Marcia aqueduct in Rome.

====== Parthia ======
- Parthians take Babylonia.

=== 143 BC ===
==== By place ====
====== Roman Republic ======
- The Celtiberian War ends when Quintus Caecilius Metellus Macedonicus crushes the rebels.

=== 142 BC ===
==== By place ====
====== Syria ======
- Diodotus Tryphon seizes the throne of the Seleucid Empire.

====== Roman Republic ======
- The first stone bridge over the Tiber river is completed.

====== Judea ======
- Simon Maccabaeus succeeds his brother Jonathan as High Priest of Judea until 135 BC.

=== 141 BC ===
==== By place ====
====== Syria and Judea ======
- The Seleucid garrison negotiates the surrender of Jerusalem. Simon Maccabaeus assumes control of the city. He becomes prince (ruler) of Judea until 135 BC.
- Demetrius II of Syria made prisoner of Mithridates, king of the Parthians. Antiochus VII Sidetes becomes king of the Seleucid Empire in his absence.

====== Bactria ======
- Yuezhi refugees appear on the borders of the Greco-Bactrian kingdom.

====== China ======
- March 9 – Emperor Wu of Han ("Martial Emperor") starts to rule the Han dynasty.

=== 140 BC ===
==== By place ====
====== Africa ======
- Scipio Aemilianus leads a group of Roman ambassadors to Alexandria, where they meet with King Ptolemy VIII.

====== Judea ======
- Simon Maccabaeus crowned king of Judea.

== Births ==
145 BC

- Sima Qian, Chinese historian (or 135 BC) (d. 86 BC)

143 BC

- Marcus Antonius, Roman politician and orator (d. 87 BC)

142 BC

- Ptolemy IX, Egyptian pharaoh (d. 81 BC)

141 BC

- Salome Alexandra, queen and regent of Judea (d. 67 BC)

140 BC

- Huo Qubing, Chinese general of the Han dynasty (d. 117 BC)
- Lucius Licinius Crassus, Roman consul and statesman (d. 91 BC)
- Su Wu, Chinese diplomat and statesman (d. 60 BC)
- Tigranes the Great, king of Armenia (d. 55 BC)

== Deaths ==
149 BC

- Cato the Elder, Roman statesman (b. 234 BC)
- Prusias II, Greek king of Bithynia (b. c. 220 BC)

148 BC

- Liu Rong, Chinese crown prince of the Han dynasty
- Masinissa, king of Numidia (b. c. 238 BC)
- Yuan Ang, Chinese statesman of the Han dynasty

147 BC

- Bo, Chinese empress of the Western Han Dynasty

146 BC

- Critolaus, general of the Achaean League
- Gentius, the last king of Illyria (approximate date)

145 BC

- Alexander Balas (assassinated)
- Ptolemy VI of Egypt (killed in battle) (b. c. 186 BC)

144 BC

- Liu Wu (aka Prince Xiao of Liang), Chinese prince of the Han dynasty

143 BC

- Jonathan Maccabaeus, Jewish leader of the Maccabees
- Zhou Yafu, Chinese general of the Han Dynasty

141 BC

- Jing of Han, Chinese emperor of the Han dynasty (b. 188 BC)
- Publius Cornelius Scipio Nasica Corculum, Roman statesman
