= 146 BC =

146 BC in various calendars
- Gregorian calendar: 146 BC; CXLVI BC
- Ab urbe condita: 608
- Ancient Egypt era: XXXIII dynasty, 178
- Pharaoh: Ptolemy VI Philometor, 35
- Ancient Greek Olympiad (summer): 158th Olympiad, year 3
- Assyrian calendar: 4605
- Balinese saka calendar: N/A
- Bengali calendar: −739 – −738
- Berber calendar: 805
- Buddhist calendar: 399
- Burmese calendar: −783
- Byzantine calendar: 5363–5364
- Chinese calendar: 甲午年 (Wood Horse); 2552 or 2345 — to — 乙未年 (Wood Goat); 2553 or 2346
- Coptic calendar: −429 – −428
- Discordian calendar: 1021
- Ethiopian calendar: −153 – −152
- Hebrew calendar: 3615–3616
- Hindu calendars
- Vikram Samvat: −89 – −88
- Shaka Samvat: N/A
- Kali Yuga: 2955–2956
- Holocene calendar: 9855
- Iranian calendar: 767 BP – 766 BP
- Islamic calendar: 791 BH – 790 BH
- Javanese calendar: N/A
- Julian calendar: N/A
- Korean calendar: 2188
- Minguo calendar: 2057 before ROC 民前2057年
- Nanakshahi calendar: −1613
- Seleucid era: 166/167 AG
- Thai solar calendar: 397–398
- Tibetan calendar: ཤིང་ཕོ་རྟ་ལོ་ (male Wood-Horse) −19 or −400 or −1172 — to — ཤིང་མོ་ལུག་ལོ་ (female Wood-Sheep) −18 or −399 or −1171

Year 146 BC was a year of the pre-Julian Roman calendar. At the time it was known as the Year of the Consulship of Lentulus and Achaicus (or, less frequently, year 608 Ab urbe condita). The denomination 146 BC for this year has been used since the early medieval period, when the Anno Domini calendar era became the prevalent method in Europe for naming years.

== Events ==
=== By place ===
==== Roman Republic ====
- Roman armies destroy Carthage and Corinth.

==== Africa ====
- Spring – Carthage falls to Roman forces under Scipio Aemilianus and the city is completely destroyed. End of the Third Punic War.

==== Greece ====
- Achaean War: The Romans conquer the Achaean League and southern Greece becomes a Roman province.

- Battle of Scarpheia: The Romans led by Quintus Caecilius Metellus Macedonicus defeat an Achaean League force under Critolaus
- Battle of Corinth: The Romans under Lucius Mummius defeat the Achaean League near Corinth. Corinth is destroyed, and the Achaean League dissolved.

=== By topic ===
==== Astronomy ====
- Hipparchus determines the equinoctial point.

== Deaths ==
- Critolaus, general of the Achaean League
- Gentius, the last king of Illyria (approximate date)
