= The Centurion (film) =

- Directed by: Mario Costa
- Starring: Jacques Sernas; Geneviève Grad; Gianna Canale; John Drew Barrymore; Gordon Mitchell
- Cinematography: Pier Ludovico Pavoni
- Music by: Carlo Innocenzi
- Release date: 1961
- Language: Italian

Il conquistatore di Corinto (AKA: The Centurion) is a French/Italian 1961 historical drama film set in 146 BC in Greece. Against the backdrop of the Battle of Corinth, this movie is centered on a love story between a Roman centurion named Caius Vinicius and Hebe, the daughter of a local governor with anti-Roman sentiments.

This film was directed by Mario Costa.

== Cast ==
- Jacques Sernas as Caius Vinicius
- John Drew Barrymore as Diaeus
- Geneviève Grad as Hebe
- Gianna Maria Canale as Artemide
- Gordon Mitchell as Quintus Caecilius Metellus Macedonicus
- Gianni Santuccio as Critolaus
- Ivano Staccioli as Hippolytus
- Nando Tamberlani as Callicrates
- Gianni Solaro as Ambassadeur
- Andrea Fantasia as Lucius Quintus
- José Jaspe as The Traitor
- Franco Fantasia as Anteo
- Miranda Campa as Cinzia
- Dina De Santis as Chimene
- Adriano Micantoni as Kerone
- Vassili Karis as Egeo
- Adriana Vianello as Cleo
- Milena Vukotic as Servant of Artemide
- Ignazio Balsamo as Geôlier
- Luciano Pigozzi as Messager from Corinthe
- Nerio Bernardi as Wealthy Citizen of Corinth
- Nino Marchetti as Citizen of Corinth

== Reception ==
The movie was criticized for significant historical inaccuracies and even called "pure peplum propaganda."

== See also ==
- List of historical films
- List of films set in ancient Rome
