= Archippus of Achaea =

2nd-century BC Greek persons

Archippus (Ancient Greek: Ἅρχιππος) was an ancient Achaean, who accompanied Andronidas to Diaeus, the commander of the Achaeans, to offer peace from the Romans in 146 BCE.

Archippus was seized by Diaeus, but released upon the payment of forty minae.

There was another Archippus from Achaea who expelled the garrison of Nabis from Argos in 194 BCE.
