= Achaean War =

War in 146 BC between Rome and the Achaean League

- Part of the Macedonian Wars
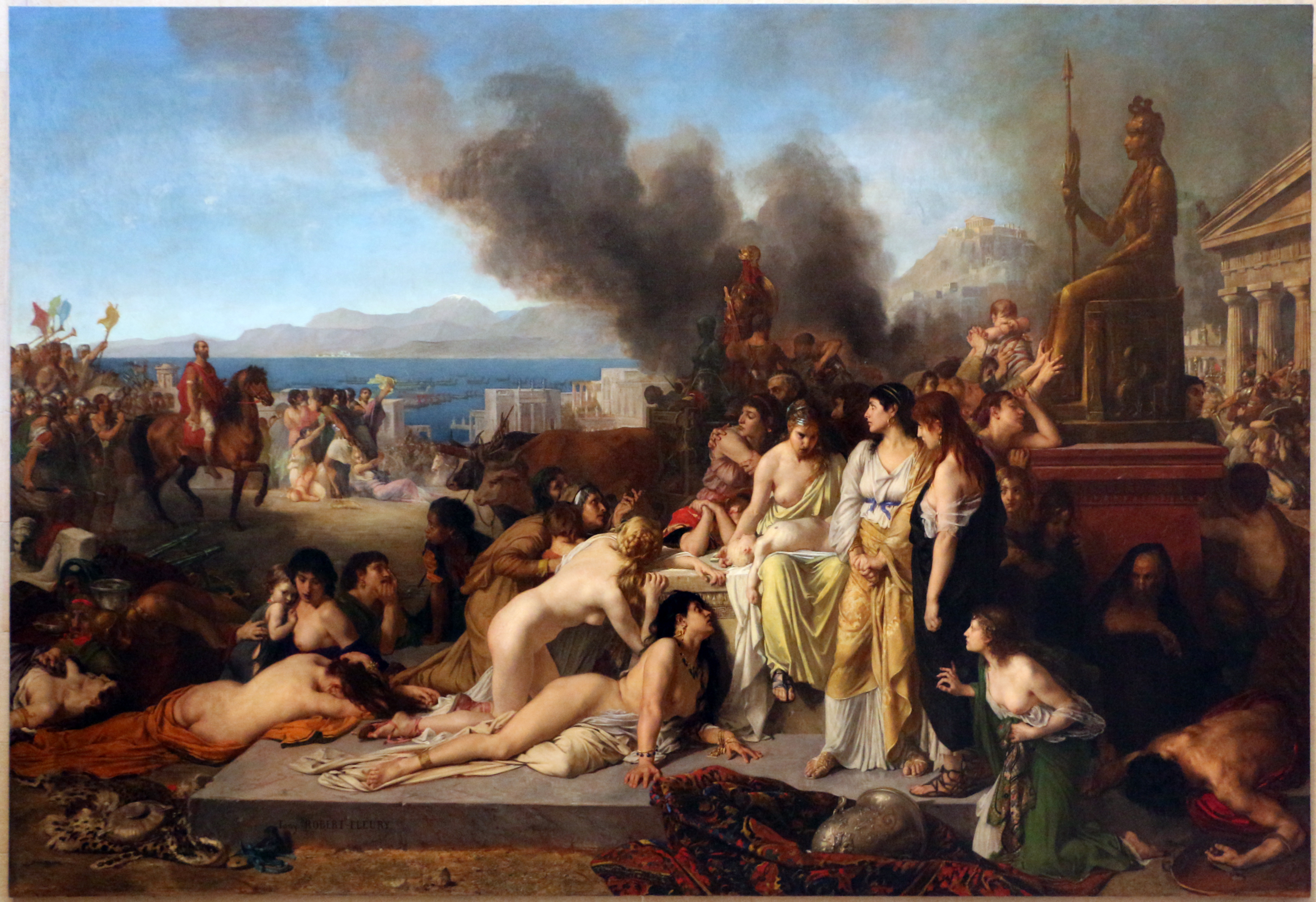
- The last day of Corinth, Tony Robert-Fleury, 1870
Date	146 BC
Location	Mainland Greece
Result	Roman victory
Territorial changes	Roman annexation of mainland Greece

Belligerents
Roman Republic	Achaean League

Commanders and leaders
Metellus Macedonicus; Lucius Mummius	Critolaos †; Diaeus †

The Achaean War of 146 BC was fought between the Roman Republic and the Greek Achaean League, an alliance of Achaean and other Peloponnesian states in ancient Greece. It was the final stage of Rome's conquest of mainland Greece, taking place just after the Fourth Macedonian War.

Rome and Achaea had been allies since the Second Macedonian War fifty years prior, but tensions between the two polities had been building up over the previous few decades, primarily over Roman efforts to throttle Achaean regional ambitions, particularly the long-desired assimilation of Sparta into the league, and the taking of large numbers of Achaean hostages by Rome in the aftermath of the Third Macedonian War. Tensions rose dramatically in 148 BC, when Achaea defeated and finally subjugated Sparta; in the aftermath of this, Rome tried to cow the League into halting its expansionist ambitions, but a failure of diplomacy between the two sides led to war.

Rome swiftly defeated the League's main force near Scarpheia, before advancing on the League's capital of Corinth, where they defeated the remnants of the Achaean forces outside the walls and then brutally sacked the city, the same year in which they destroyed Carthage. The war marked the beginning of direct Roman control of Greece, and the end of Greek independence, as well as the beginning of the end of the Hellenistic period. It is also noted for its significant cultural impact on Rome; the preponderance of Greek art, culture and slaves in the aftermath of the conquest accelerated the development of Greco-Roman culture.

== Background ==
The Roman Republic had developed close ties to the Achaean League through similar religious and military beliefs and a cooperation in the previous Macedonian Wars. However, despite co-operation in the latter part of the third century and early second century, political problems in Achaea soon came to a head. Two factions began to emerge: one, championed by the Achaean statesmen Philopoemen and Lycortas, which called for Achaea to determine its own foreign policy according to its own law, and the other, championed by figures like Aristaenus and Diophanes, which believed in yielding to Rome on all matters of foreign policy.

Achaea was, in addition, undergoing internal pressures beyond the question over the nature of the influence of Rome. The withdrawal of Messene from the Achaean League and further disputes with Sparta over the nature of its position in the League led to growing amounts of micromanagement by the Romans, including the sending in 184 of a Roman, Appius Claudius, to judge the case between Sparta and Achaea.

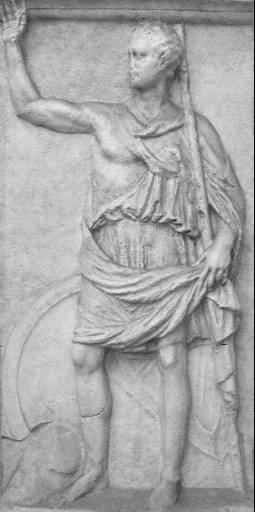
One of the hostages was the future historian Polybius of Megalopolis; he would become an important source for the Hellenistic Period and the Punic Wars.

The taking of thousands of hostages by Rome in order to guarantee the compliance of Achaea during the Third Macedonian War created great resentment in Greece, and was the source of much diplomatic quarrel between Achaea and Rome; it is arguable that this contributed in large part to the souring of relations between the two powers. The sending of no fewer than five Achaean embassies to Rome seeking the return of the hostages, and Roman intransigence to Achaean concerns, demonstrate the power difference between the two. The diplomatic stand-off would trigger a chain of events that ultimately led to the Achaean War.

=== Events leading to war ===
Achaean domestic politics at the time played a large part in the coming about of the war. Upon the election of the populist generals Critolaos and Diaeus, economic proposals were made which would relieve the debt burden of the poor, free native-born and native-bred slaves, and increase taxes on the rich, all of which, according to Polybius, had the desired effect of increasing support for a nationalistic dispute with Rome amongst the lower classes of Achaea. An uprising around this time by the pretender Andriscus in the Fourth Macedonian War may also have spread to Achaea, giving hope that Rome, engaged in the Third Punic War to the West, would be too busy to deal with Greek rebellions against Roman rule.

Roman foreign policy in the Greek east in the period following the Third Macedonian War had also become increasingly in favour of micromanagement and the forced breaking-up of large entities, seen by the regionalisation of Macedon by the general Lucius Mummius Achaicus and the Senate's mission to the magistrate Gallus, upon the application of the town Pleuron to leave the Achaean League, to sever as many cities from it as possible; Pausanias writes that Gallus "behaved towards the Greek race with great arrogance, both in word and deed".

In 150 BC, hostilities between Sparta and the League flared up again; Sparta demanded more autonomy, and revolted when this was refused. The Acheans swiftly defeated Sparta, but the League's strategos of 149, Damocritus, decided not to press the offensive further, either due to Roman pressure or a policy of pacifism. This was unpopular, and resulted in his exile. The strategos of 148, Diaeus, was elected on a platform of aggression and League unity, and hence swiftly pressed home the attack, and subjugated Sparta by the end of the year. During this war, Rome did not intervene beyond sending a few mild requests for peace, as the Fourth Macedonian War and the Third Punic War had become serious, requiring their attention.

In 147, however, Rome sent a fresh embassy, led by former consul Lucius Aurelius Orestes. Orestes tried to announce the forced reduction of the Achaean League to its original, narrow grouping - effectively crippling it and ending its territorial ambitions once and for all. This may have been an attempted negotiation tactic, but it backfired, and the embassy was almost mobbed. A Roman effort at restoring peace, led by Orestes' former co-consul Sextus Julius Caesar, went badly, and the Achaeans, outraged at Rome's actions, and whipping up populist sentiment, declared war on Sparta, electing Critolaos as strategos of the league. There is debate as to how this declaration sparked the war: whether it was an implicit declaration against Rome as well, or Rome reacted to the declaration.

== War ==
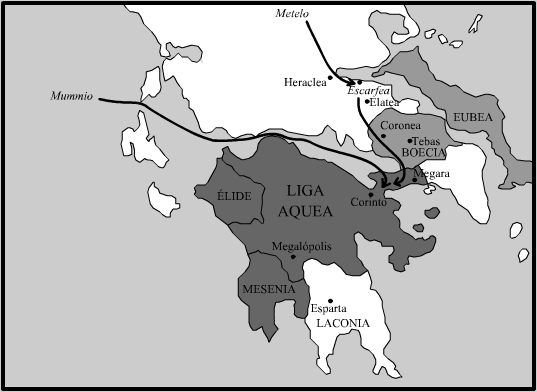
Extent of the Achaean League on the eve of the war, showing the invasion routes of Mummius and Metellus

The Achaeans were aware that they were entering a suicidal war of defiance, as Rome had just soundly conquered Macedon, a much more powerful kingdom. Two Roman armies were sent to put down the uprising - one under Mummius, who was now consul, sent from Italy, and the other under praetor Quintus Caecilius Metellus Macedonicus, who had recently defeated Andriscus and put down the Macedonian uprising. Critolaos was besieging Heraclea in Trachis, which had rebelled from the League, when he learnt that Metellus was marching from Macedonia to fight him. He retreated to Scarpheia, but Metellus caught up with him and decisively defeated him at the Battle of Scarpheia, after which he put his army into winter quarters. Critolaos died during or after the battle, either drowning in the marshes of Mount Oeta or poisoning himself.

The defeat and death of Critolaos caused great confusion and panic in the Greek world, with some cities such as Elis and Messene now surrendering to the Romans. However, many elements of the League, especially Corinth, rallied around Diaeus, electing him as strategos to replace Critolaos and resolving to continue the war, with harsh levies and confiscations of property and wealth. Metellus now advanced through Boeotia, capturing Thebes, which had been allied to the Achaeans. He made an offer of peace to the League, but was rebuffed by Diaeus, who also had pro-peace and pro-Roman politicians arrested or killed.

Mummius now arrived, and after ordering Metellus back to Macedonia, gathered all available Roman forces - 23,000 infantry and 3,500 cavalry - for an assault on Corinth. Diaeus also rallied what forces he could, amounting to 13,500 infantry and 650 cavalry. After success in an initial skirmish, Diaeus gained confidence and decided to engage the Romans directly in battle. In the ensuing Battle of Corinth, however, his inferior cavalry was quickly driven off by the Roman cavalry. This exposed his flank to an attack by 1,000 picked Roman infantry, routing his army.

Diaeus abandoned his troops and fled to Megalopolis, where he committed suicide after killing his wife.

=== Sack of Corinth ===
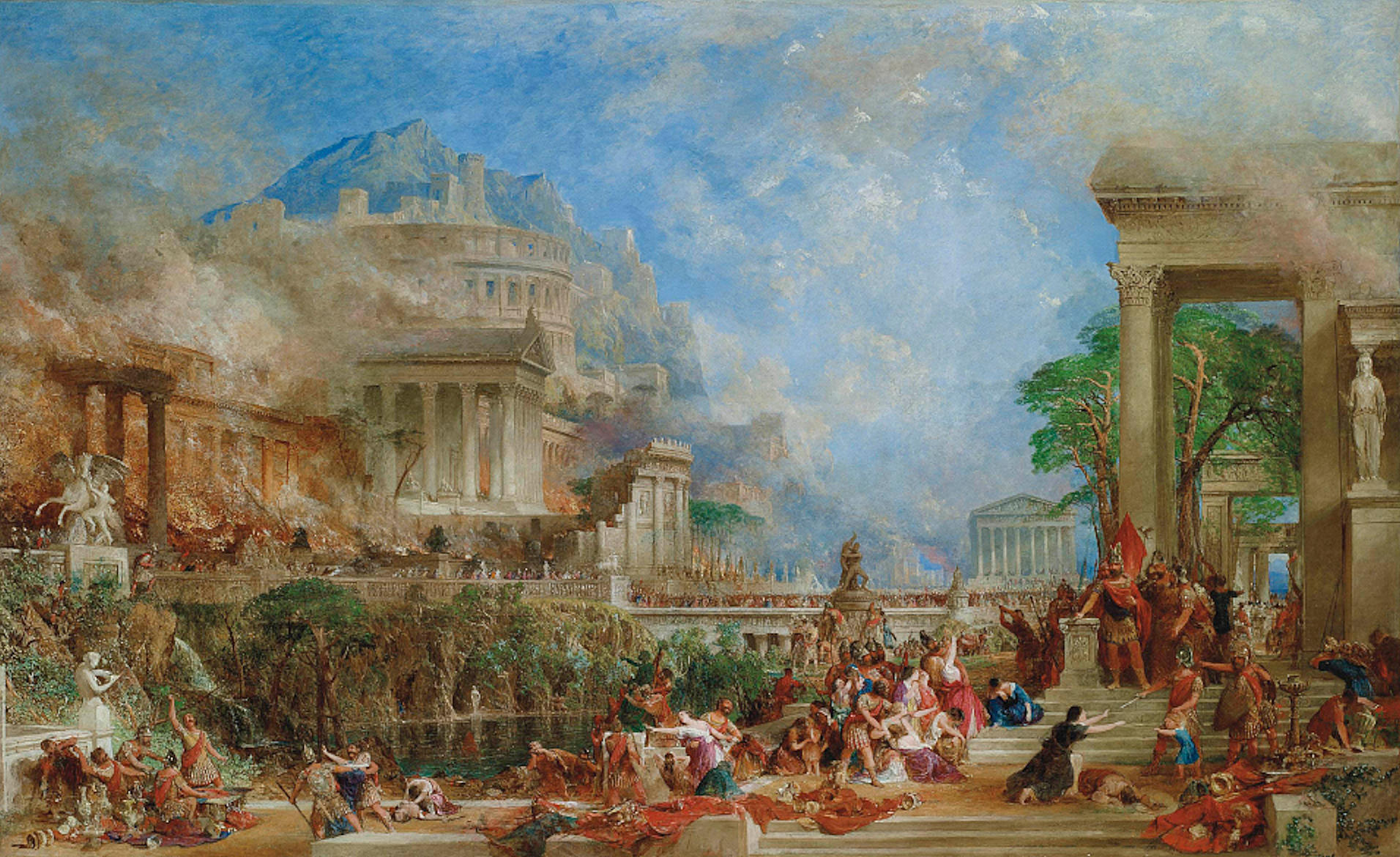
The Sack of Corinth, by Thomas Allom

Demoralized, the surviving Achaean troops and most Corinthians fled the city, leaving it defenseless, allowing the Romans to secure it, though only three days after the battle, as Mummius feared an ambush. Any remaining Greek holdouts now surrendered. The consul granted freedom to all Greeks, except the Corinthians. In Corinth, however, the Romans massacred the entire adult male population and enslaved all the women and children, after which they destroyed the city. This apparently needless display of cruelty in Corinth, is explained by Mommsen as due to the instructions of the Senate, prompted by the mercantile party, which was eager to dispel a dangerous commercial rival. According to Polybius, Mummius was unable to resist the pressure of those around him. According to Dio, Mummius took care not to enslave any non-Corinthians. Livy writes that Mummius did not appropriate any of the spoils for himself, and praises him for his integrity.

Polybius mentions the carelessness of Roman soldiers, who destroyed works of art or treated them like objects of entertainment. However, they did show respect to the statues of Philopoemen, both for his fame and as he was the first ally of Rome in Greece. Mummius was extremely ignorant in matters of art - when transporting priceless statues and paintings to Italy, he gave orders that the contractors should be warned that if they lost them, they would have to replace them by new ones.

== Roman reorganization of Greece ==
In the immediate aftermath of the conquest, Mummius ordered the walls of all cities that had taken part in the revolt to be torn down, and forced all cities to hand over their weapons and military equipment.

Soon, the senate dispatched ten commissioners to Achaea to aid the consul in the task of reorganising Greece. The Greeks had to pay war indemnities and tributes, all leagues and other political entities were dissolved, and power was given to pro-Roman elites. Eventually, however, some financial relief was given, and autonomy was granted to some cities, including Athens and Sparta. Politically, the Greek states were grouped into the Roman province of Macedonia, though Achaea would become a separate province under Augustus in 27 BC.

== Aftermath ==
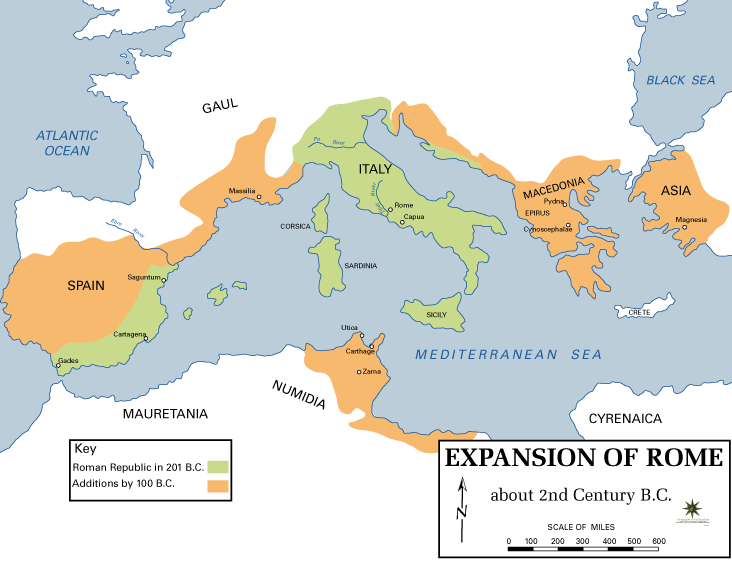
The Roman Republic at the end of the second century BC, after the Achaean War, the Lusitanian and Numantine Wars and the accession of Pergamon to Rome

Mummius celebrated a triumph and gained the agnomen Achaicus. With wealth from his Greek campaigns, he erected a theatre with improved acoustical conditions and seats after the Greek model, thus marking a distinct advance in the construction of places of entertainment.

The war marked the end of Greek political independence, and the beginning of the end of the Hellenistic period. Pergamon, the only significant remaining power in the Aegean, was generally pro-Roman, and its last king, Attalus III, bequeathed it to Rome through his will upon his death in 133 BC. Thus, seventy years after Rome was first involved in Greek affairs in the First Macedonian War, it was now in control of all of the classical Greek world, and had cemented its position as the dominant power in the Mediterranean.

The annexation would also mark the beginning of a new, Greco-Roman culture, as Greek and Roman culture intermingled, a process that had begun in the wake of the conquest of Magna Graecia by the Romans more than a century before.

== Gallery ==
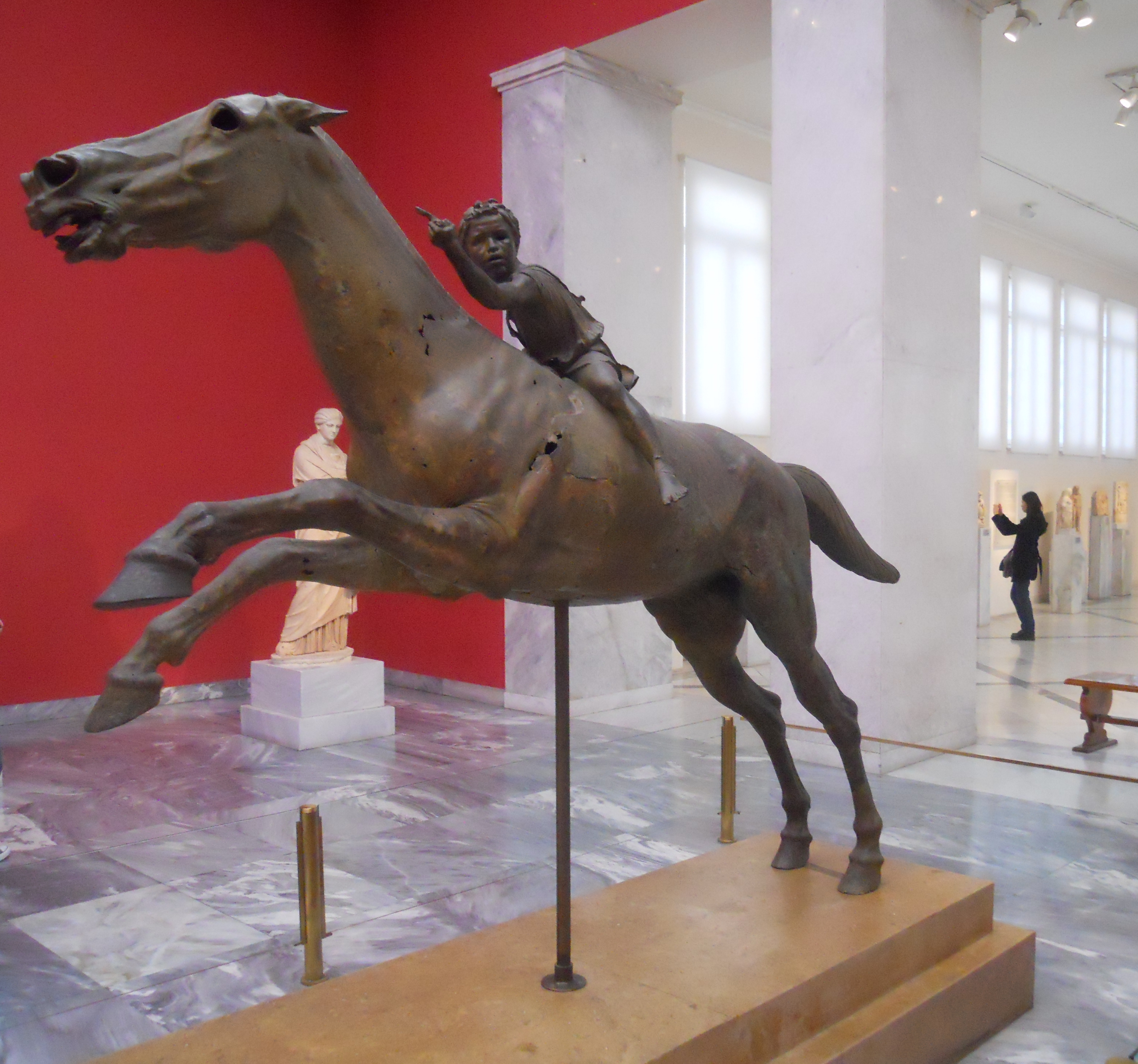
The Jockey of Artemision, which may have been taken from Corinth in the looting of the city by Mummius

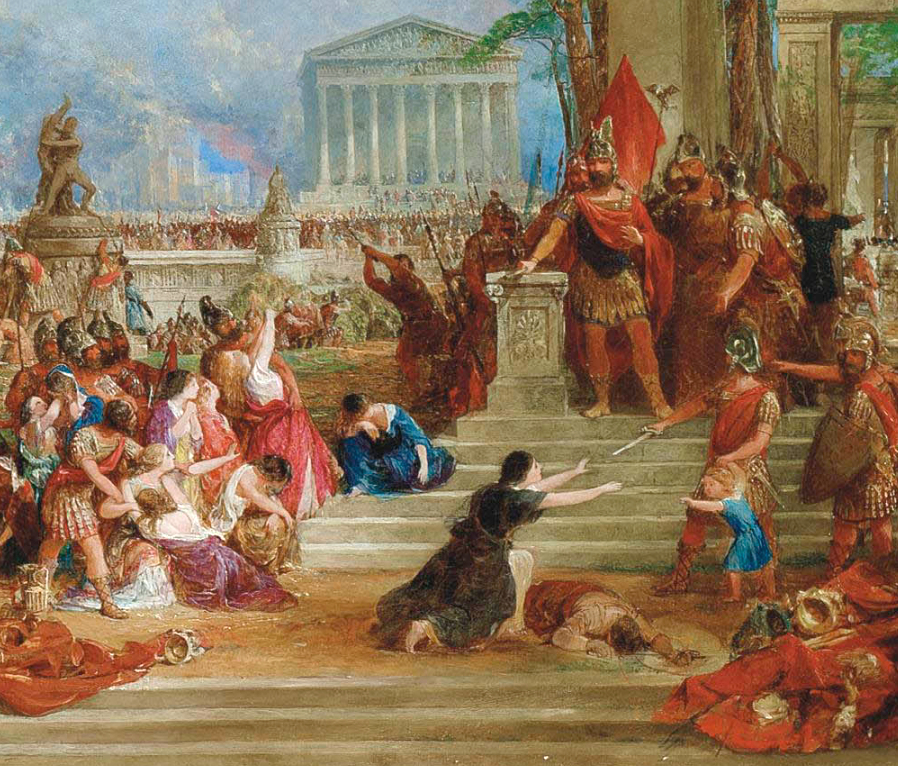
Roman general Lucius Mummius Achaicus in The Sack of Corinth, by Thomas Allom (detail)

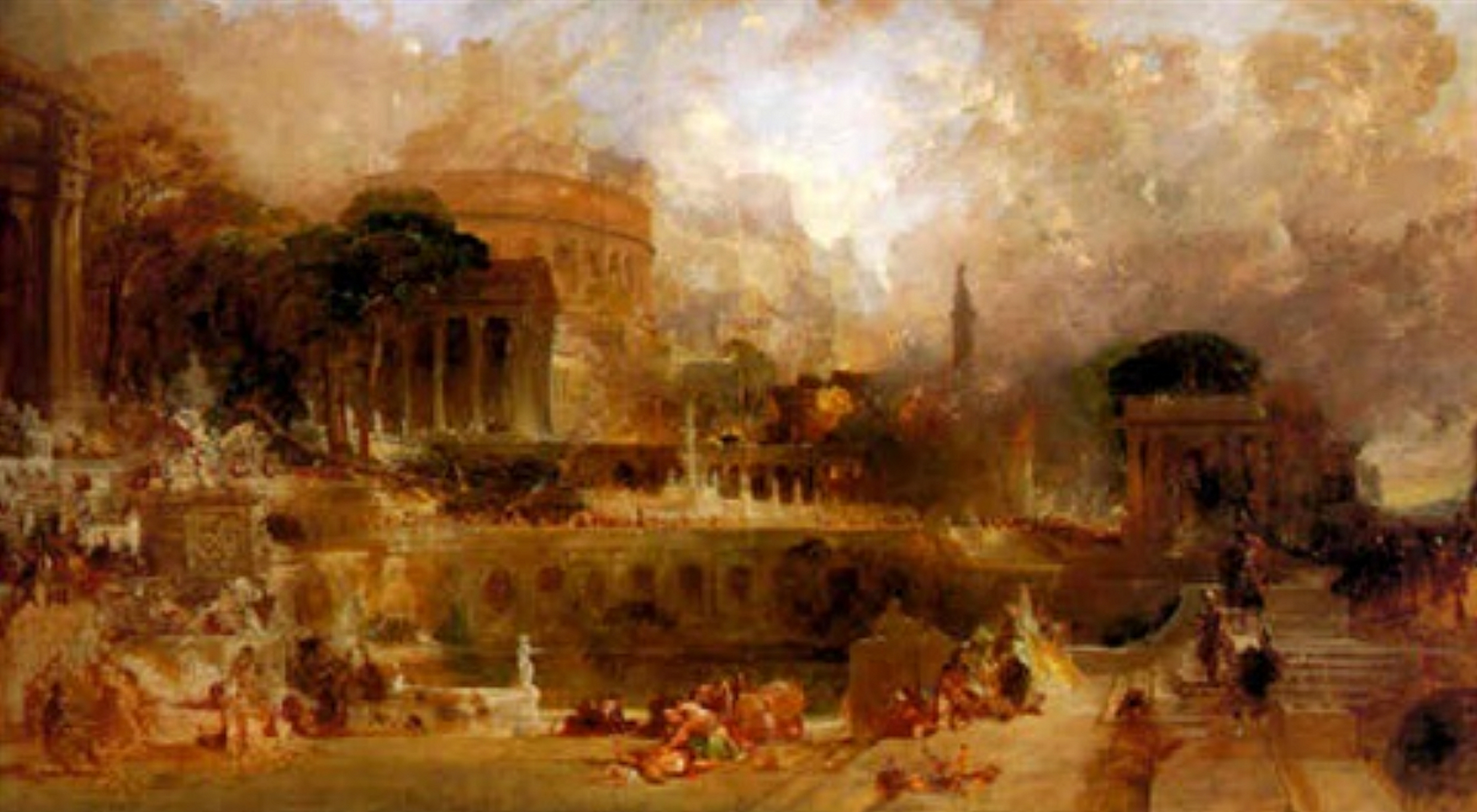
The Destruction of Corinth, by Thomas Allom

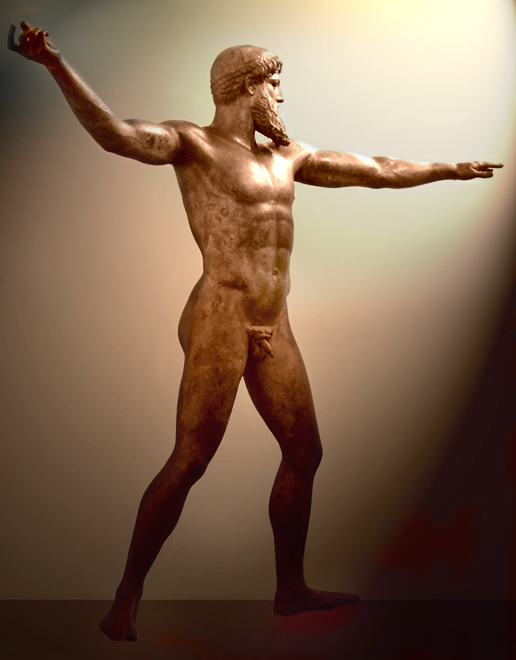
The Artemision Bronze, another bronze which may have been taken from Corinth
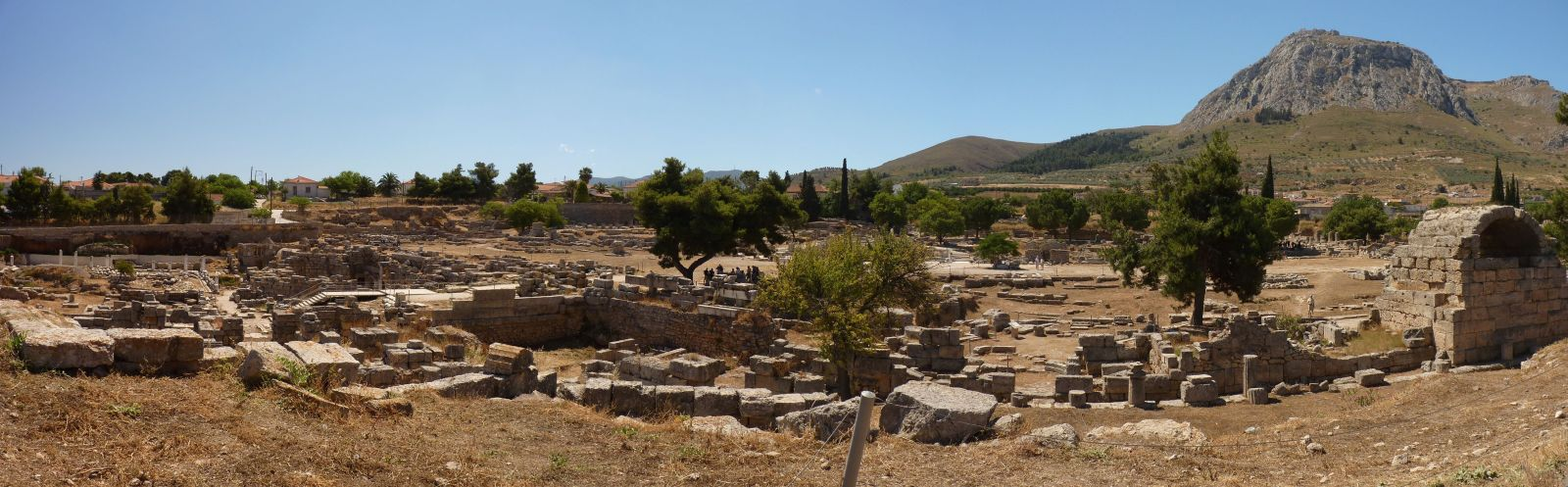
A portion of the ruins of Corinth, as seen today

== Sources ==
=== Primary sources ===
- Cassius Dio, Roman History, Book 21
- Velleius Paterculus, Roman history, Book I
- Livy, Periochae 51-55
- Polybius, The Histories, Books 37 and 38
- Diodorus Siculus, Bibliotheca Historica, Book 32
- Pausanias, Description of Greece, Book 7

=== Secondary sources ===
- Wilson, N. G. Encyclopedia of Ancient Greece. New York: Routledge, 2006. Print. Google Books.
- Wright, Edmund (2006). A dictionary of World History. York: Oxford University Press. ISBN 978-0-192-80700-7.
- Dillon, Matthew; Garland, Lynda (2005). Ancient Rome: From the Early Republic to the Assassination of Julius Caesar. Taylor & Francis. pp. 267–. ISBN 978-0-415-22458-1.
- Dunstan, William (2010). Ancient Rome. ISBN 978-0-74256-834-1.
- Henrichs, Albert (1995). "Graecia Capta: Roman Views of Greek Culture". Harvard Studies in Classical Philology. 97: 243–261. JSTOR 311309.
- Gruen, Erich S. (1976). "The Origins of the Achaean War". The Journal of Hellenic Studies. 96: 46–69. JSTOR 631223.
- Derow, P.S. (1989). Astin, A. E.; Walbank, F. W.; Frederiksen, M.W.; Ogilvie, R. M. (eds.). Rome, the fall of Macedon and the sack of Corinth. Cambridge: Cambridge University Press. pp. 290–323. doi:10.1017/CHOL9780521234481.010.
