= Aristaenus =

Strategos of the Achaean league

Aristaenus (Ancient Greek: Ἀρίσταινος) of Megalopolis, was sometimes called "Aristaenetus" by Polybius and Plutarch. Aristaenus, however, appears to be the correct name.

He was strategus of the Achaean league in 198 BCE, and induced the Achaeans to join the Romans in the war against Philip V of Macedon. Polybius defends him from the charge of treachery for having done so. In the following year (197 BCE) he was again strategus and accompanied the consul Titus Quinctius Flamininus to his interview with Philip. In the same year he also persuaded the Boeotians to take up the side of the Romans.

In 195 BCE, when he was yet again strategus, he joined Flamininus with 10,000 foot soldiers and 1000 horse in order to attack the Spartan ruler Nabis. He was also strategus in 185 BCE, and attacked Philopoemen and Lycortas for their conduct in relation to the embassy that had been sent to Ptolemy V Epiphanes.

Aristaenus was the political opponent of Philopoemen, and showed more readiness to satisfy the wishes of the Romans than Philopoemen did. He was eloquent and skilled in politics, but described as being not especially distinguished in war.

Some historians think that he is to be identified with Aristaenos of Dyme, son of Timocades or Damocades, who was hipparch 208/07 BC. Others hold that they were two different people.

Preceded by Cycliadas	Strategos of the Achaean League; 199 BC – 198 BC	Succeeded by Nicostratos
Preceded by Nicostratos	Strategos of the Achaean League; 195 BC – 194 BC	Succeeded by Philopoimen
Preceded by Philopoimen	Strategos of the Achaean League; 186 BC – 185 BC	Succeeded by Lykortas of Megalopolis
