= 148 BC =

148 BC in various calendars
- Gregorian calendar: 148 BC; CXLVIII BC
- Ab urbe condita: 606
- Ancient Egypt era: XXXIII dynasty, 176
- Pharaoh: Ptolemy VI Philometor, 33
- Ancient Greek Olympiad (summer): 158th Olympiad (victor)¹
- Assyrian calendar: 4603
- Balinese saka calendar: N/A
- Bengali calendar: −741 – −740
- Berber calendar: 803
- Buddhist calendar: 397
- Burmese calendar: −785
- Byzantine calendar: 5361–5362
- Chinese calendar: 壬辰年 (Water Dragon); 2550 or 2343 — to — 癸巳年 (Water Snake); 2551 or 2344
- Coptic calendar: −431 – −430
- Discordian calendar: 1019
- Ethiopian calendar: −155 – −154
- Hebrew calendar: 3613–3614
- Hindu calendars
- Vikram Samvat: −91 – −90
- Shaka Samvat: N/A
- Kali Yuga: 2953–2954
- Holocene calendar: 9853
- Iranian calendar: 769 BP – 768 BP
- Islamic calendar: 793 BH – 792 BH
- Javanese calendar: N/A
- Julian calendar: N/A
- Korean calendar: 2186
- Minguo calendar: 2059 before ROC 民前2059年
- Nanakshahi calendar: −1615
- Seleucid era: 164/165 AG
- Thai solar calendar: 395–396
- Tibetan calendar: ཆུ་ཕོ་འབྲུག་ལོ་ (male Water-Dragon) −21 or −402 or −1174 — to — ཆུ་མོ་སྦྲུལ་ལོ་ (female Water-Snake) −20 or −401 or −1173

Year 148 BC was a year of the pre-Julian Roman calendar. At the time it was known as the Year of the Consulship of Magnus and Caesoninus (or, less frequently, year 606 Ab urbe condita). The denomination 148 BC for this year has been used since the early medieval period, when the Anno Domini calendar era became the prevalent method in Europe for naming years.

== Events ==
=== By place ===
==== Ireland ====
- Corlea Trackway built in County Longford

==== Roman Republic ====
- With the defeat of Andriscus in the Battle of Pydna by Quintus Caecilius Metellus Macedonicus, Macedon is reorganized as a Roman province by 146 BC.
- Construction of the Via Postumia, linking Aquileia and Genua.
- Publius Cornelius Scipio Aemilianus divides Numidia among the three sons of the recently deceased Masinissa.

==== Hellenistic Egypt ====
- Demetrius II Nicator, claimant to the Seleucid throne had challenged Alexander Balas, in view of the threat of such an invasion Ptolemy VI Philometor entered Coele-Syria, passing through the cities of Ashdod and Jaffa, to Ptolemais.

== Deaths ==
- Liu Rong, Chinese crown prince of the Han dynasty
- Masinissa, king of Numidia (b. c. 238 BC)
- Yuan Ang, Chinese statesman of the Han dynasty
