= Andronidas =

Andronidas (Ancient Greek: Ἀνδρωνίδας), was with Callicrates the leader of the Roman party among the Achaeans. In 146 BCE, he was sent by Quintus Caecilius Metellus Macedonicus to Diaeus, the commander of the Achaeans, to offer peace; but the peace was rejected, and Andronidas was seized by Diaeus, who however released him upon the payment of a talent.
