= Armand-Charles Caraffe =

French painter (1762–1822)

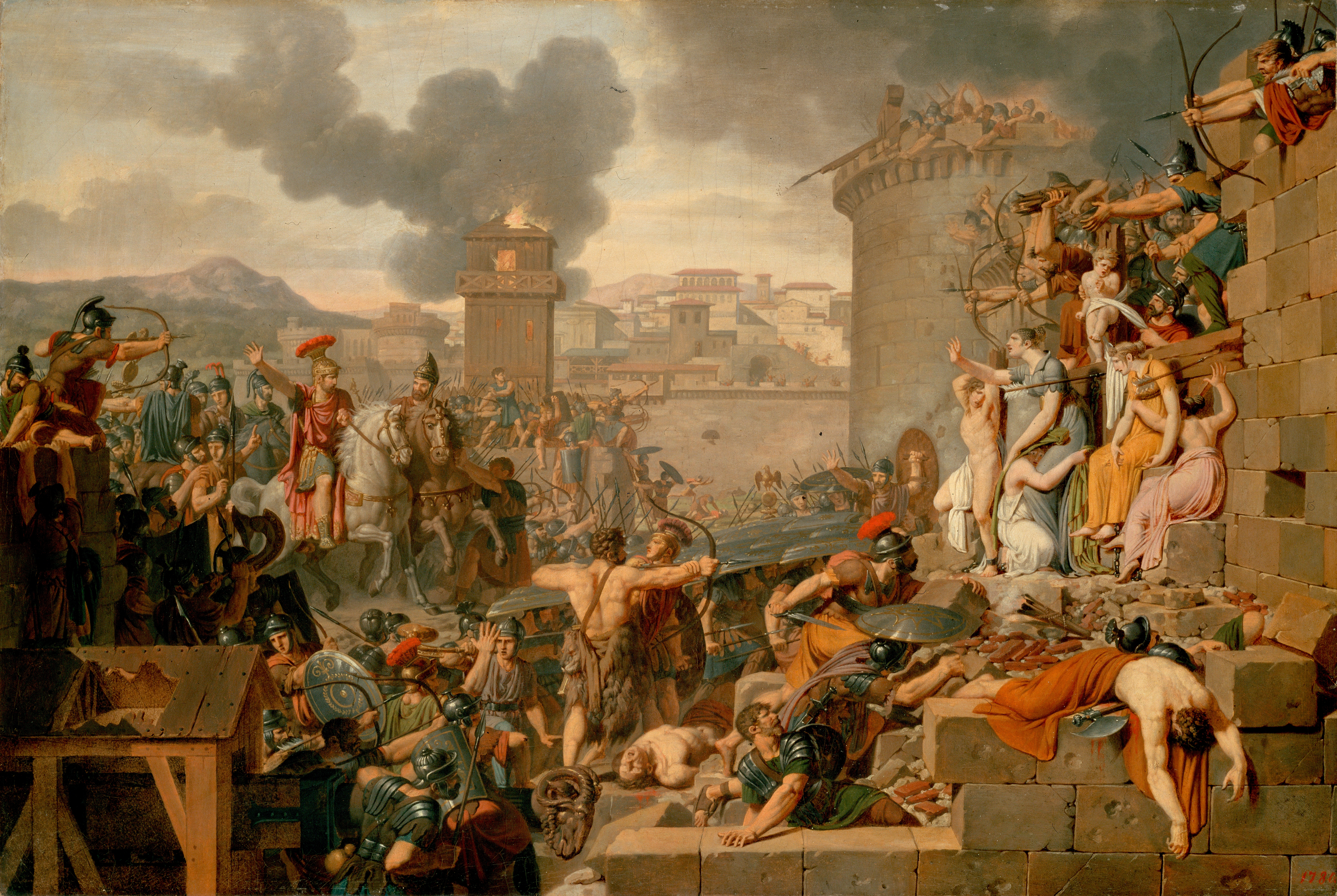
Metellus Raising the Siege, now at the Hermitage Museum in St. Petersburg

Armand-Charles Caraffe (1762–1822) was a French historical painter and etcher, who spent part of his career at the Russian Imperial court.

== Life ==
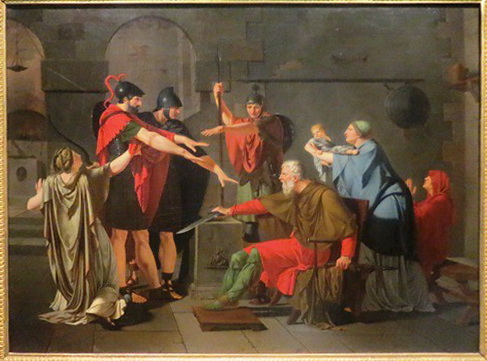
The Oath of the Horatii, now at the Pushkin Museum in Moscow

Caraffe was born in Paris in 1762. He was a pupil of Lagrenée and David. He visited Rome, and then travelled in Turkey, but returned to France at the outbreak of the Revolution becoming so active a member of the Jacobin Club that he was imprisoned from 1794 to 1797. In 1799 he exhibited 1799 a picture of Hope supporting Misfortune to the Grave, which was much praised, and in the following year one of Love, abandoned by Youth and the Graces, consoling himself on the bosom of Friendship, which was purchased by the wife of the First Consul. In 1802 he left France for an appointment at the Court of St. Petersburg, where he remained until 1812, and painted The Oath of the Horatii for Prince Yusupov. He eventually returned to Paris, where he died on 18 August 1822.
