= Battle of Scarpheia =

Battle between Rome & Achaean League

- Part of the Achaean War
Date	146 BC
Location	Near Scarphe, Locris
Result	Roman victory

Belligerents
Roman Republic	Achaean League

Commanders and leaders
Quintus Caecilius Metellus Macedonicus	Critolaos of Megalopolis †

Strength
2 legions and allies	Unknown

Casualties and losses
Light	Heavy

The Battle of Scarpheia took place in 146 BC between forces of the Roman Republic, led by the praetor Quintus Caecilius Metellus Macedonicus, and an Achaean League force led by Critolaos of Megalopolis. The battle was a resounding Roman victory, surprising and destroying the main Achaean force at the outbreak of war and allowing the Romans to bring the conflict to a swift end not long after.

== Background ==
Rome and Achaea had been longtime allies for nearly half a century. However, tensions between the two polities had been building up in the last few decades, due to the growth of Roman power in the region, which had led to Roman desires to check Achaean ambitions and Achaean resentment at being reduced to a lesser position to their once-equal alliance. These tensions peaked in 149/148 BC, when Achaea desired to fully assimilate Sparta into the league, which Rome opposed. The Romans sent two consecutive embassies to the Achaean capital of Corinth. The first embassy, sent in the summer of 147 BC, adopted a belligerent tone, trying to announce the forced reduction of Achaea to its original, narrow grouping and sternly rebuking the League. This embassy was almost mobbed, leading to a second, more considerate embassy being sent, which was much more conciliatory and simply sought to achieve a peaceful settlement. It was better received, but there seems to have been a failure of diplomacy, which eventually led the Roman Senate to decide on war against the League. It is debated as to whether the Achaean leaders deliberately provoked the Romans into war, or simply miscalculated the Senate's patience.

The war was to be led by one of the consuls for the year, Lucius Mummius, but while he prepared to sail from Italy to Greece, the Senate allowed praetor Quintus Caecilius Metellus Macedonicus, who had recently been victorious in the Fourth Macedonian War and was stationed in Macedonia, to act against the League.

== Prelude ==
Back in Achaea, the league's strategos of 147/6, Critolaos, prepared the League for a war against Sparta, unaware of Roman intentions, when the town of Heraclea in Trachis, in the north of the League, revolted. He reacted swiftly, marching to the town and putting it under siege; it was then that he learned that Metellus' forces were marching from Macedonia to fight him.

== Battle ==
Metellus' advance seems to have caught the strategos completely off-guard; he hastily fled with his forces to the town of Scarphe, where Metellus caught up with him. The sources do not describe a set-piece battle but instead a wild and chaotic rout, with the League's forces fleeing or getting killed or captured by the Romans. John Frost, in his 1831 History of Ancient and Modern Greece noted that after their defeat, some of the Greeks "slew themselves, others fled wildly from their dwellings, without knowing or thinking whither to bend their steps. Some seized their fellows and delivered them to the Romans; some acted as sycophants and false accusers." Critolaos himself disappeared forever, leaving only rumour and speculation about his fate.

== Aftermath ==
The battle saw the League's main force destroyed at barely the outbreak of war; it ensured that the Romans would have an easy and swift campaign. The Romans advanced through Boeotia, had their peace offers rebuffed by the Achaeans, and proceeded to defeat a hastily assembled League army at Corinth, after which they sacked the city, dissolved the League and subjugated all of mainland Greece, establishing a permanent presence in the region.

== Sources ==
=== Primary sources ===
- Cassius Dio, Roman History, Book 21
- Paterculus, Velleius; J. C. Yardley; Anthony A. Barrett (2011). The Roman History: From Romulus and the Foundation of Rome to the Reign of the Emperor Tiberius. Hackett Publishing. ISBN 1603847022.
- Polybius, The Histories, Books 38 and 39
- Pausanias, Description of Greece, Book 7

=== Secondary sources ===
- Frost, John (1831). History of Ancient and Modern Greece. Lincoln and Edmands.
- Gruen, Erich S. (1976). "The Origins of the Achaean War". The Journal of Hellenic Studies. 96: 46–69. JSTOR 631223.
