= Cycliadas =

Cycliadas (Ancient Greek: Κυκλιάδας) was an ancient Greek statesman and general. He was the son of Damaretos of Pharae in Achaea. Elected as strategos of the Achaean League in 208 BC, he joined Philip V of Macedon at Dyme with the Achaean forces, and aided him in his invasion of Elis. In 200 BC, Cycliadas being made strategos instead of Philopoemen, the Spartan king Nabis took advantage of the change to make war on the Achaeans. Philip offered to help them, and to carry the war into the enemy's country, if they would give him a sufficient number of their soldiers to garrison Chalcis, Oreus and Corinth in the meantime. The Achaeans, however, mistrusted Philip and suspected that it was a ploy to obtain hostages from them and so to force them into a war with the Romans. Cycliadas therefore answered, that their laws precluded them from discussing any proposal except that for which the assembly was summoned. In 199/8 BC, Cycliadas was expelled as a result of his position as leader of the pro-Macedonian party. In 198 BC he was an exile at the court of Philip, whom he attended in that year at his conference with Flamininus at Nicaea in Locris.

After the Battle of Cynoscephalae in 197 BC, Cycliadas was sent with Demosthenes and Limnaeus as ambassador from Philip to Flamininus, who granted the king a truce of 15 days with a view to the arrangement of a permanent peace.
