= Battle of Corinth (146 BC) =

Battle between the Roman Republic and Corinth and its allies in 146 BC

- Part of the Achaean War
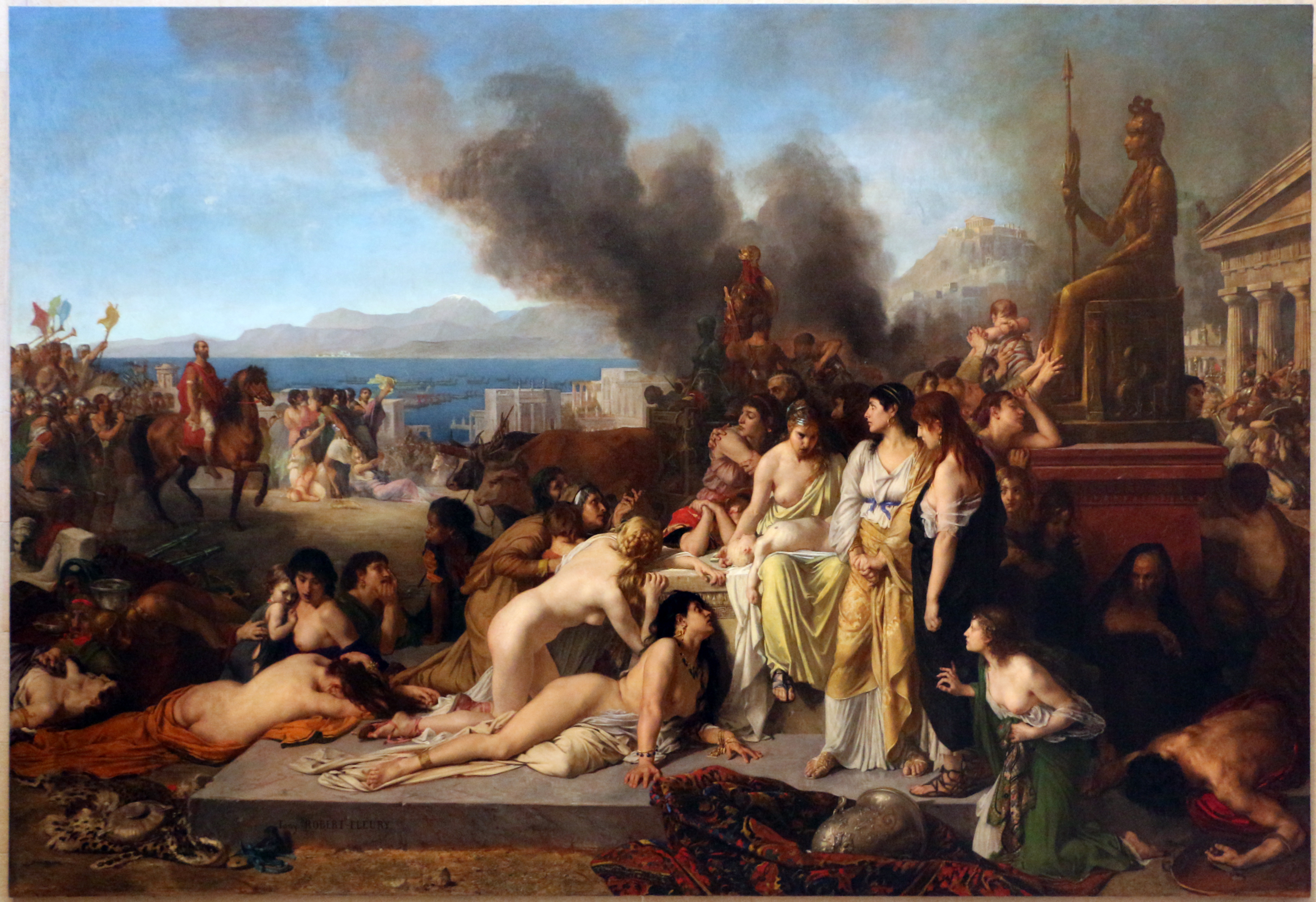
- The last day of Corinth by Tony Robert-Fleury (1870)
| Date | 146 BC |
| Location | Corinth, Peloponnese 37.9053°N 22.8802°E |
| Result | Decisive Roman victory |
| Territorial changes | Complete annexation of Greece by Rome |

Belligerents
| Roman Republic | Achaean League |

Commanders and leaders
| Lucius Mummius | Diaeus † |

Strength
| Two Roman legions and Italian Allies; 3500 Cavalry; 23000 Infantry | 600 cavalry 14000 infantry |

The Battle of Corinth of 146 BC, also known as the Battle of Leucapetra or the Battle of Lefkopetra, was a decisive engagement fought between the Roman Republic and the Greek city-state of Corinth and its allies in the Achaean League. The battle marked the end of the Achaean War and the beginning of the period of Roman domination in Greek history, and is also notable for the complete destruction of Corinth by the Romans in its aftermath.

The Romans had moved swiftly since the war's beginning a few weeks earlier; they had destroyed the main Achaean force at Scarpheia, conquered Boeotia and then proceeded to Corinth itself. Despite the Roman successes, the Achaeans refused to surrender and gathered a final army for the defense of the League's capital of Corinth, where they engaged the Romans in battle. In a few hours of fighting, the Achaeans were soundly routed, with their troops killed, captured, or put to flight. After a few days' waiting, the Romans entered the city, and, on the orders of Mummius, set it on fire, killed all the men and enslaved all the women and children, after which the rest of Greece was subjugated by Rome.

== Background ==
Tensions between Rome and Achaea had been building up for a few decades prior to the conflict that is now known as the Achaean War, but tensions came to a head in 148-146 BC, over Achaean desires to assimilate the poleis of Sparta into the League. Relations broke down between the League and Rome over this issue; Cassius Dio reported that it was the Achaeans (Greeks) who began the quarrel, but Roman expansionism, Achaean demagoguery or even a simple failure of diplomacy have been suggested as reasons. The Roman Senate ordered Lucius Mummius, one of the consuls for the year, to sail from Achaea to Greece to put down the revolt, but in the interim, they authorized Quintus Caecilius Metellus Macedonicus, who had recently been victorious in the Fourth Macedonian War and had a battle-hardened army in Macedon, to take initial action.

== Prelude ==
Marching from Macedonia, which had just been turned into a Roman province, the Romans defeated an Achaean army under Critolaos of Megalopolis at the Battle of Scarpheia. This defeat caused great confusion and panic in the Greek world, with a number of cities now surrendering to the Romans. However, much of the League, especially Corinth, rallied around Diaeus, electing him as strategos to replace Critolaos and resolving to continue the war, with harsh levies and confiscations of property and wealth. After the battle, the Roman commander advanced through Boeotia, defeating Achaean allies in the region or receiving the surrender of multiple towns and showing them clemency. He made an offer of peace to the League, but was rebuffed by Diaeus, who also had pro-peace and pro-Roman politicians arrested or killed.

In 146 BC, Lucius Mummius arrived, sent Metellus back to Macedonia and gathered all Roman forces in the region, amounting to 23,000 infantry and 3,500 cavalry (probably two legions plus Italian allies), as well as Cretans and Pergamese allies. With this force, he proceeded to the League's capital of Corinth, where the Achaean general Diaeus was encamped with 14,000 infantry and 600 cavalry, possibly including the survivors of the rout at Scarpheia.

== Battle ==
The Romans had posted some Italian auxiliaries as lookouts, but they were careless in their watch, possibly on account of hubris at the smaller Achaean army. This allowed the Achaeans to make a successful night attack on the camp of the Roman advance guard, inflicting significant casualties and bolstering Achaean morale. Mummius then sallied out himself, routing the pursuers and driving them back to the Achaean camp.

Encouraged by their early successes, the Achaeans offered battle the next day. In the ensuing battle, the infantry stood the charge of the legions, but the Achaean cavalry, heavily outnumbered, did not wait to receive the Roman cavalry charge and instead rapidly dispersed. The Achaean infantry, however, held the legions despite being outnumbered, until a picked force of 1,000 Roman infantry charged their flank and broke their lines completely, at which the routed Achaeans retreated in disorder within the city walls. Some Achaeans took refuge in Corinth but no defense was organized because Diaeus fled to Arcadia, where he committed suicide.

== Sack of Corinth ==
Demoralized at their leader's flight, the surviving Achaean troops and most Corinthians fled the city, but the Romans, fearing an ambush, did not enter Corinth until three days after the battle. Once in Corinth, the Romans killed all men and enslaved the women and the children, after which the city was sacked and utterly destroyed by the victorious Roman army and saw all of her treasures and art plundered. According to Polybius, Mummius was unable to resist the pressure of those around him. Livy writes that Mummius did not appropriate any of the spoils for himself, and praises him for his integrity.

Polybius mentions the carelessness of Roman soldiers, who destroyed works of art or treated them like objects of entertainment. However, they did show respect to the statues of Philopoemen, both for his fame and as he was the first ally of Rome in Greece. Mummius was extremely ignorant in matters of art—when transporting priceless statues and paintings to Italy, he gave orders that the contractors should be warned that if they lost them, they would have to replace them by new ones.

== Aftermath ==
The battle marked the end of Achaean resistance; Greece would not see fighting again until the First Mithridatic War sixty years later. The League was dissolved, Greece was annexed to the newly created province of Macedonia (though some autonomy was given to certain cities) and direct Roman control over mainland Greece was established.

As in the Sack of Syracuse, the sack of Corinth saw the inflow of many Greek works of art into the Roman world, exposing it further to Greek culture and paving the way for the development of the Greco-Roman world.

The city of Corinth did not recover for over a century. While there is archaeological evidence of some minimal habitation in the years afterwards, it was only when Julius Caesar re-established the city as Colonia Laus Iulia Corinthiensis in 44 BC, shortly before his assassination, that the city began to experience some of its old prosperity once again.

== Gallery ==
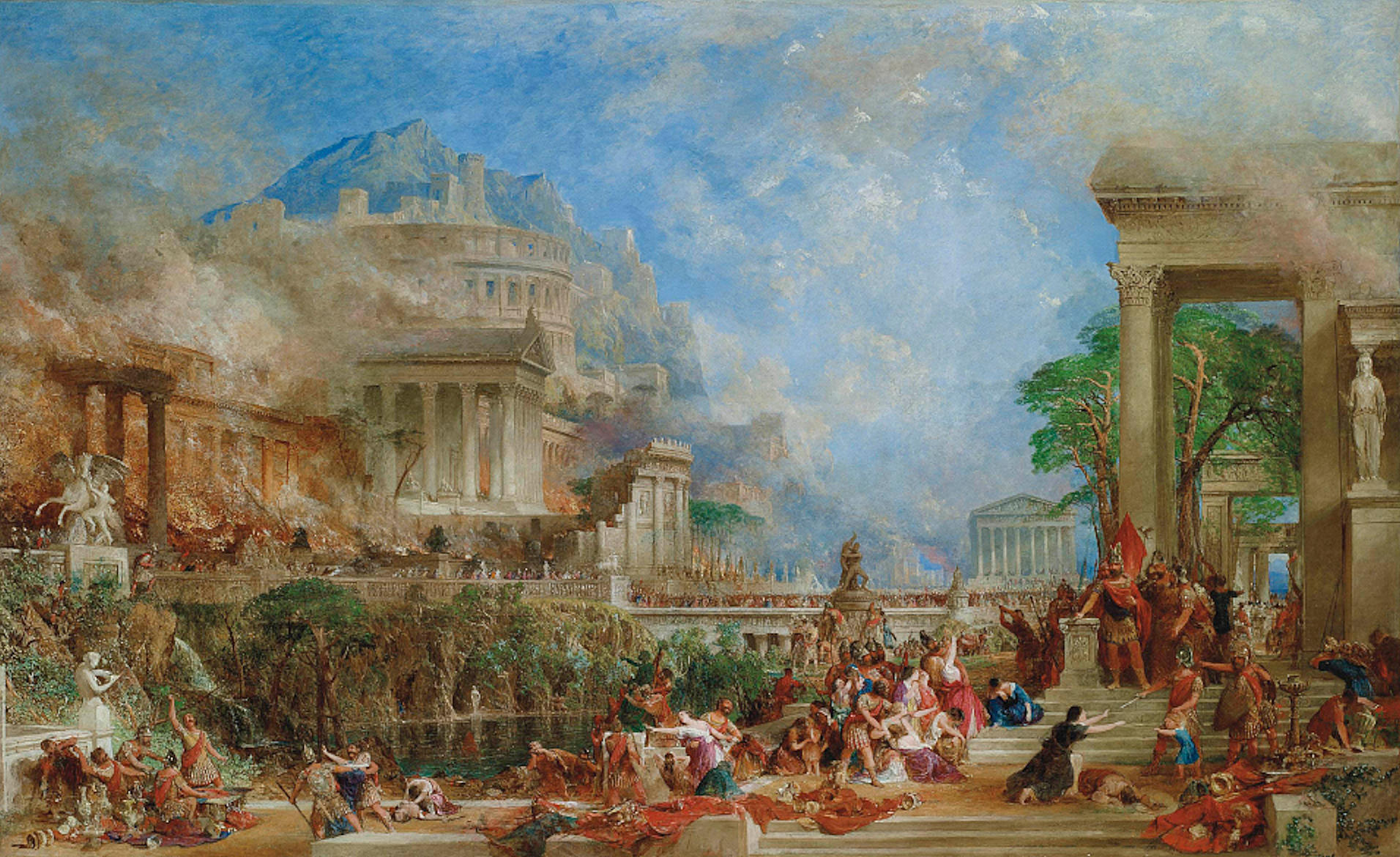
The Sack of Corinth, by Thomas Allom

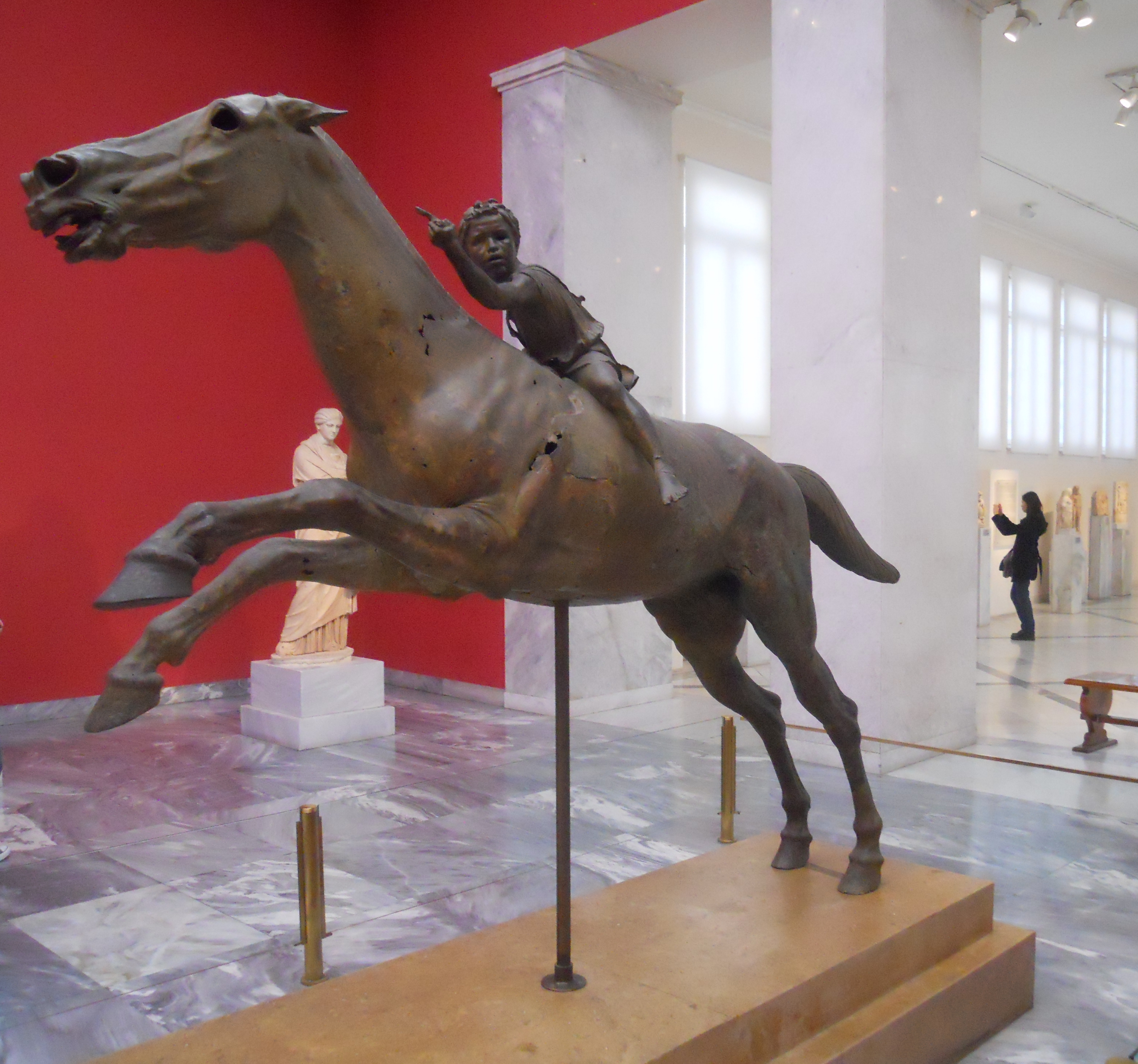
The Jockey of Artemision, which may have been taken from Corinth in the looting of the city by Mummius

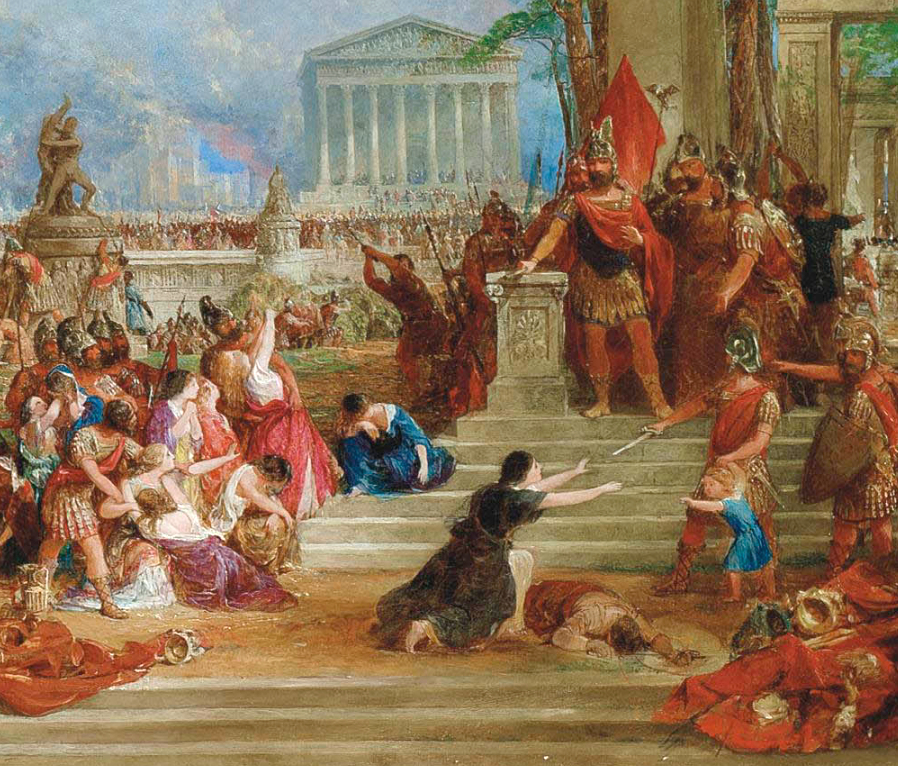
Roman general Lucius Mummius Achaicus in The Sack of Corinth, by Thomas Allom (detail)

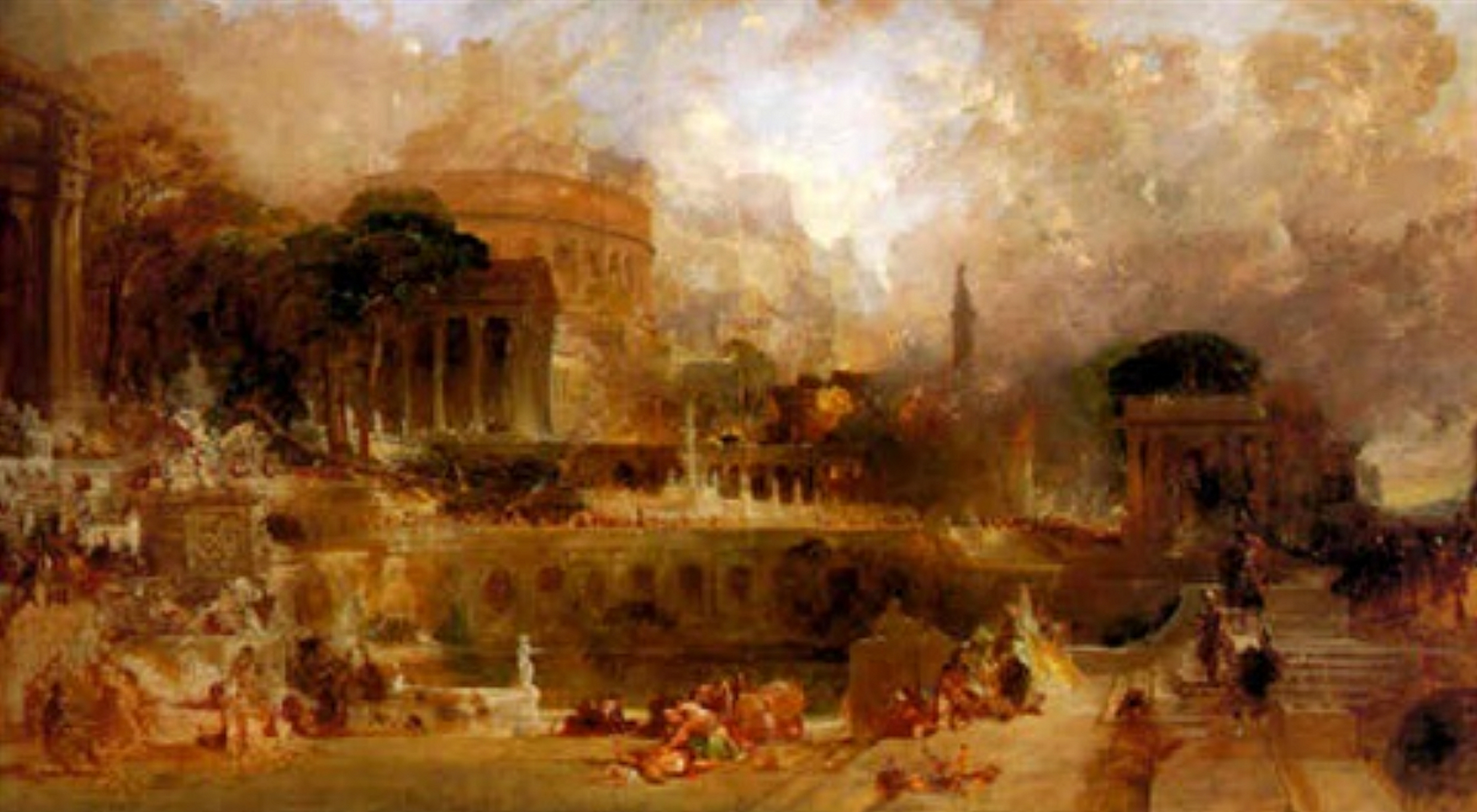
The Destruction of Corinth, by Thomas Allom

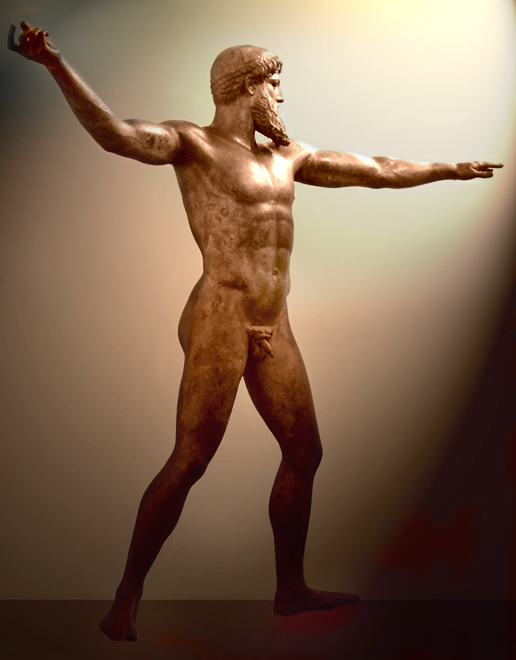
The Artemision Bronze, another bronze which may have been taken from Corinth

== In popular culture ==
- The Battle of Corinth was the central event in the 1961 film The Centurion.

== See also ==
- Siege of Carthage (Third Punic War)
- Siege of Jerusalem (70 CE)

== Sources ==
=== Primary sources ===
- Cassius Dio, Roman History, Book 21
- Velleius Paterculus, Roman history, Book I
- Livy, Ab Urbe Condita Libri, Book XLV and Periochae 46-50
- Polybius, The Histories, Books 38 and 39
- Pausanias, Description of Greece, Book 7

=== Secondary sources ===
- Bourchier, James David (1911). "Greece" . In Chisholm, Hugh (ed.). Encyclopædia Britannica (11th ed.). Cambridge University Press.
- Dillon, Matthew; Garland, Lynda (2005). Ancient Rome: From the Early Republic to the Assassination of Julius Caesar. Taylor & Francis. pp. 267–. ISBN 978-0-415-22458-1.
- Gruen, Erich S. (1976). "The Origins of the Achaean War". The Journal of Hellenic Studies. 96: 46–69. doi:10.2307/631223. JSTOR 631223. S2CID 162729635.
- Henrichs, Albert (1995). "Graecia Capta: Roman Views of Greek Culture". Harvard Studies in Classical Philology. 97: 243–261. doi:10.2307/311309. JSTOR 311309.
- Holland, Tom (2003). Rubicon: The Last Years of the Roman Republic.
