= Lycortas =

Ancient Megalopolitan politician

Lycortas /lɪˈkɔːrtəs/ of Megalopolis (Greek: Λυκόρτας Lykórtas), son of Thearidas, was a politician of the Achaean League active in the first half of the 2nd century BC. He was the father of the historian Polybius. A political ally of Philopoemen, he shared the latter's view that the Romans should be dealt with according to the strict letter of their treaty with the League, and that no more assistance should be given to them than was necessary. In this way they hoped to delay the inevitable increase of Rome's power over Greece. Lycortas' son Polybius shared his father's views, and for this reason was one of the thousand Greeks deported to Italy in the aftermath of the Roman victory at Pydna in 168 BC. Lycortas' own fate is unknown, owing to the fragmentary nature of our sources at this point.
