= Philopoemen =

Ancient Greek general

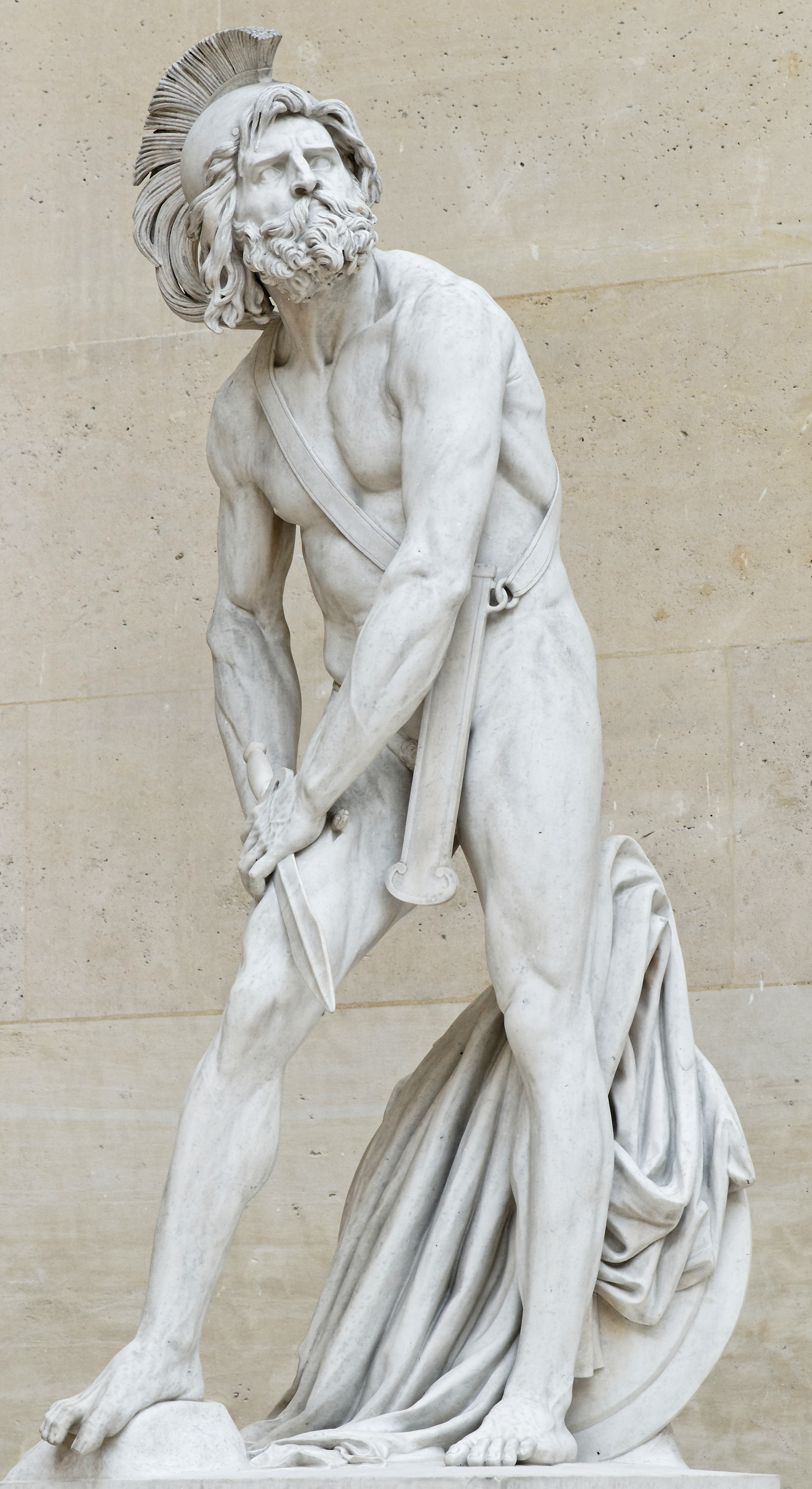
Philopoemen, hurt by David d'Angers, 1837, Louvre

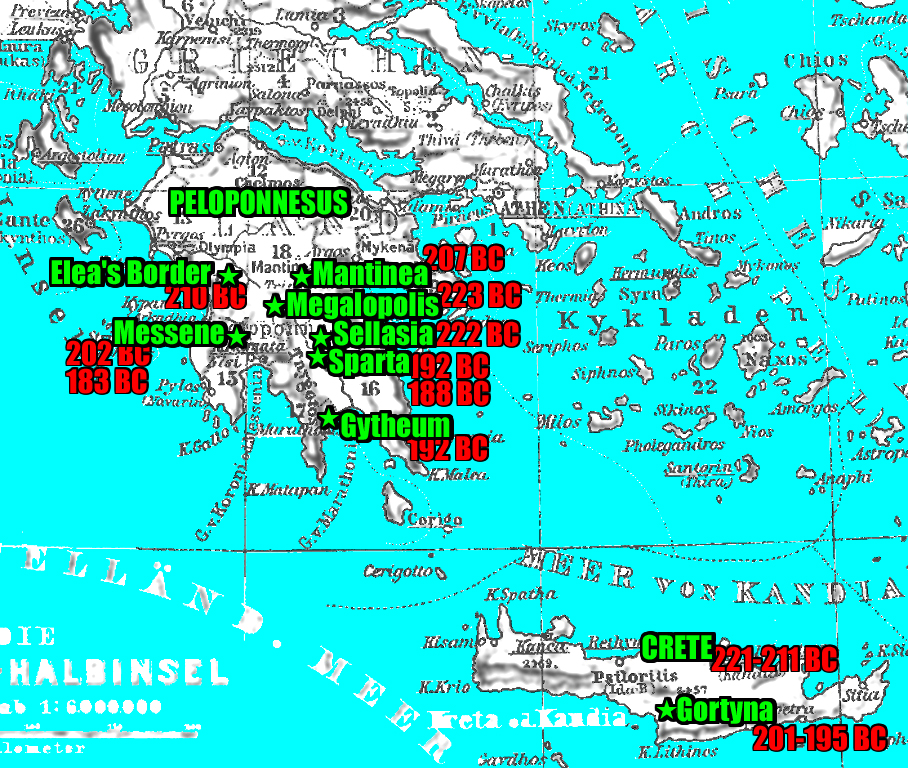
Relevant geographical locations, during Philopoemen's life.

Philopoemen /ˌfɪləˈpiːmən/ (Greek: Φιλοποίμην Philopoímēn; 253 BC, Megalopolis – 183 BC, Messene) was a skilled Greek general and statesman, who was Achaean strategos on eight occasions.

From the time he was appointed as strategos in 209 BC, Philopoemen helped turn the Achaean League into an important military power in Greece.

== Early life ==
The son of Craugis of Megalopolis, his father died early in his life. He was then adopted by an important citizen of Megalopolis, Cleander.

Philopoemen was educated by academic philosophers Ecdemus and Demophanes. Both were Megapolitans, who had helped to depose previous tyrants of Megalopolis, Sicyon and Cyrene. Thus, he was inculcated with notions of freedom and democracy. Philopoemen strove to emulate the 4th-century BC Theban general and statesman, Epaminondas. Philopoemen believed that as a public servant, personal virtue was at all times a necessary condition. So Philopoemen wore humble garments for the rest of his life, spurning any expensive adornments.

== Battle of Megalopolis ==
Philopoemen first came to the attention of key Greek politicians when he helped defend Megalopolis against the Spartan king Cleomenes III in 223 BC. Cleomenes III had seized Megalopolis. Philopoemen was amongst the first defending the city. During the battle, Philopoemen lost his horse and he was wounded. Nevertheless, he remained involved in the battle until the end. His actions helped give the citizens of Megalopolis enough time to evacuate the city.

== Battle of Sellasia ==
The king of Macedonia, Antigonus III Doson, was keen to restore Macedonian influence in the Peloponnese for the first time in almost two decades. In 224 BC, he signed an alliance with the Achaeans, Boeotians, Thessalians and the Acarnanians. With his rear secured by treaties, Antigonus invaded the Peloponnese and drove the Spartans out of Argos, taking Orchomenus and Mantineia in the process.

When he advanced against Laconia, however, Antigonus found that Cleomenes had blocked all the mountain passes except for one. It was there, near Sellasia, that Cleomenes waited with his army.

Philopoemen commanded a cavalry force, which included soldiers from Megalopolis. He was supported by Illyrian infantry. When the latter entered into the battle, they were surrounded by the enemy. So Philopoemen launched his own attack. While his forces suffered many casualties, the surprised Spartan forces fled. In the encounter, Philopoemen's horse fell and he was wounded by a javelin. Yet he continued to fight behind the enemy's lines.

In the end the Spartan forces were massacred by the Macedonians and their allies and Cleomenes was forced to flee to Egypt. As the leader of the Achaeans, Philopoemen's actions impressed Antigonus III.

== Cavalry commander ==
From 221 BC he subsequently spent 10 years in Crete as a mercenary captain; fighting in the Lyttian War. Returning to mainland Greece in 210 BC, Philopoemen was appointed commander of the cavalry in the Achaean League.

In the same year, in one of the battles associated with the First Macedonian War between Macedonia and the Roman Republic, Philopoemen faced Damophantus, whose army was composed of Aetolians and Eleans, near the Larissa river (on the border of Elis). During the battle, Damophantus charged directly against Philopoemen with his spear. Bravely, Philopoemen didn't retreat, but waited with his lance, which he mortally thrust into Damophantus' chest. Immediately, the enemy fled from the battlefield. By this action, Philopoemen's fame increased across Greece.

== The Battle of Mantinea ==
Philopoemen was appointed strategos of the Achaean League in 209 BC. Philopoemen used his position to modernise and increase the size of the Achaean army and updated the soldiers’ equipment and battle tactics.

His efforts to make the Achaeans an effective fighting force bore fruit a couple of years later.

In the years following the defeat of the Spartan king Cleomenes III at the Battle of Sellasia, Sparta experienced a power vacuum that eventually led to the Spartan kingship being bestowed on a child, Pelops, for whom Machanidas ruled as regent.

The Battle of Mantinea was fought in 207 BC between the Spartans led by Machanidas and the Achaean League, whose forces were led by Philopoemen. The Achaeans defeated the Spartans. In the battle, Philopoemen defeated and killed the Spartan ruler Machanidas in one-on-one combat. Afterward, the Achaeans erected at Delphi a bronze statue which captured the fight between Machanidas and Philopoemen.

With his victory at Mantinea, Philopoemen was able to go on to capture Tegea, and then move with his army as far as the Eurotas River.

== The rise of Nabis of Sparta ==
Following Machanidas' death, Nabis, a nobleman from the royal house of the Eurypontids, a descendant of King Demaratus, rose to power in Sparta and became the new regent for Pelops. Nabis soon overthrew Pelops. Under Nabis, Sparta continued to trouble the Peloponnese.

In 205 BC, Philip V of Macedon made a temporary peace (the Peace of Phoenice) with Rome on favourable terms for Macedonia thus ending the First Macedonian War. After the Peace, Nabis went to war against the Achaean League. However, Philopoemen was able to expel Nabis from Messene.

Philopoemen was appointed strategos for the Achaean League between 201 and 199 BC.

In 201 BC, Nabis invaded and captured Messene. However, the Spartans were forced to retreat when the Achaean League army under Philopoemen intervened. Nabis' forces were decisively defeated at Tegea by Philopoemen and Nabis was forced to check his expansionist ambitions for the time being.

== Philopoemen returns to Crete ==
The Cretan city of Gortyna then asked for Philopoemen's help. So in 199 BC Philopoemen returned to Crete again as a mercenary leader. Philopoemen had to change his tactics as the fighting on the island was more in the style of guerrilla warfare. Nonetheless, with Philopoemen's experience, he was able to defeat his enemies. Philopoemen spent six years in Crete.

In the meantime, Nabis took advantage of Philopoemen's absence, laying siege to Megalopolis for a lengthy period. Nabis also acquired the important city of Argos from Philip V of Macedon, as the price of his alliance with the Macedonians. Nabis then defected to the Romans in the expectation of being able to hold on to his conquest.

In 196 BC, Roman general and pro-consul Titus Quinctius Flamininus accused the Spartan ruler, Nabis, of tyranny, took Gythium in Laconia and forced Nabis to surrender Argos. After checking the ambitions of the Spartan tyrant, Nabis, the Roman forces under Flamininus withdrew from Greece in 194 BC. With the Romans no longer having a military presence in Greece, the dominant powers in the region were the kingdom of Macedon, the Aetolians, the strengthened Achaean League and a weakened Sparta. The Aetolians, who had opposed the Roman intervention in Greek affairs, incited the Spartan leader, Nabis, to retake his former territories and regain his influence in Greek affairs.

== Philopoemen’s return as Achaean League strategos ==
Returning to the Greek mainland as strategos in 193 BC, Philopoemen was appointed strategos for a second time to lead the fight against Nabis.

In 192 BC, Nabis attempted to recapture the Laconian coastline. The Achaeans responded to Sparta's renewed interest in recovering lost territory by sending an envoy to Rome with a request for help. In response, the Roman Senate sent the praetor Atilius with a navy, as well as an embassy headed by Flamininus.

Not waiting for the Roman fleet to arrive, the Achaean army and navy headed towards Gythium under the command of Philopoemen. The Achaean fleet under Tiso was defeated by the Spartan fleet. On land, the Achaeans were unable to defeat the Spartan forces outside Gythium and Philopoemen retreated to Tegea.

When Philopoemen re-entered Laconia for a second attempt, his forces were ambushed by Nabis, but nevertheless Philopoemen managed to gain a victory over the Spartan forces. Philopoemen's plans for capturing Sparta itself were put on hold at the request of the Roman envoy, Flaminius, after his arrival in Greece. In return, Nabis decided, for the moment, to accept the status quo.

== The subjugation of Sparta ==
Nabis then appealed to the Aetolians for help. They sent 1,000 cavalry to Sparta under the command of Alexamenus. However, the Aetolians murdered Nabis and temporarily occupied Sparta. The Aetolian troops seized the palace and set about looting the city, but the inhabitants of Sparta were able to rally and forced them to leave the city.

But Philopoemen took advantage of the Aetolian treachery and entered Sparta with his Achaean army. Now in full control of Sparta, Philopoemen forced Sparta to become a member state of the Achaean League.

Sparta's entry into the league raised the problem of how to deal with all of the Spartans exiled by the social-revolutionary regimes that had dominated Sparta for a number of years. Philopoemen wanted to restore only those Spartans who were willing to support the league. This meant that he adopted an uncompromising hostility to traditional Spartan concerns.

In 188 BC, Philopoemen entered northern Laconia with his army and a group of Spartan exiles. His army demolished the wall that the former tyrant of Sparta, Nabis, had built around Sparta. Philopoemen then restored Spartan citizenship to the exiles and abolished Spartan law and its education system, introducing Achaean law and institutions in their place. Sparta's role as a major power in Greece ended, while the Achaean League became the dominant power throughout the Peloponnese.

== Philopoemen's final years ==
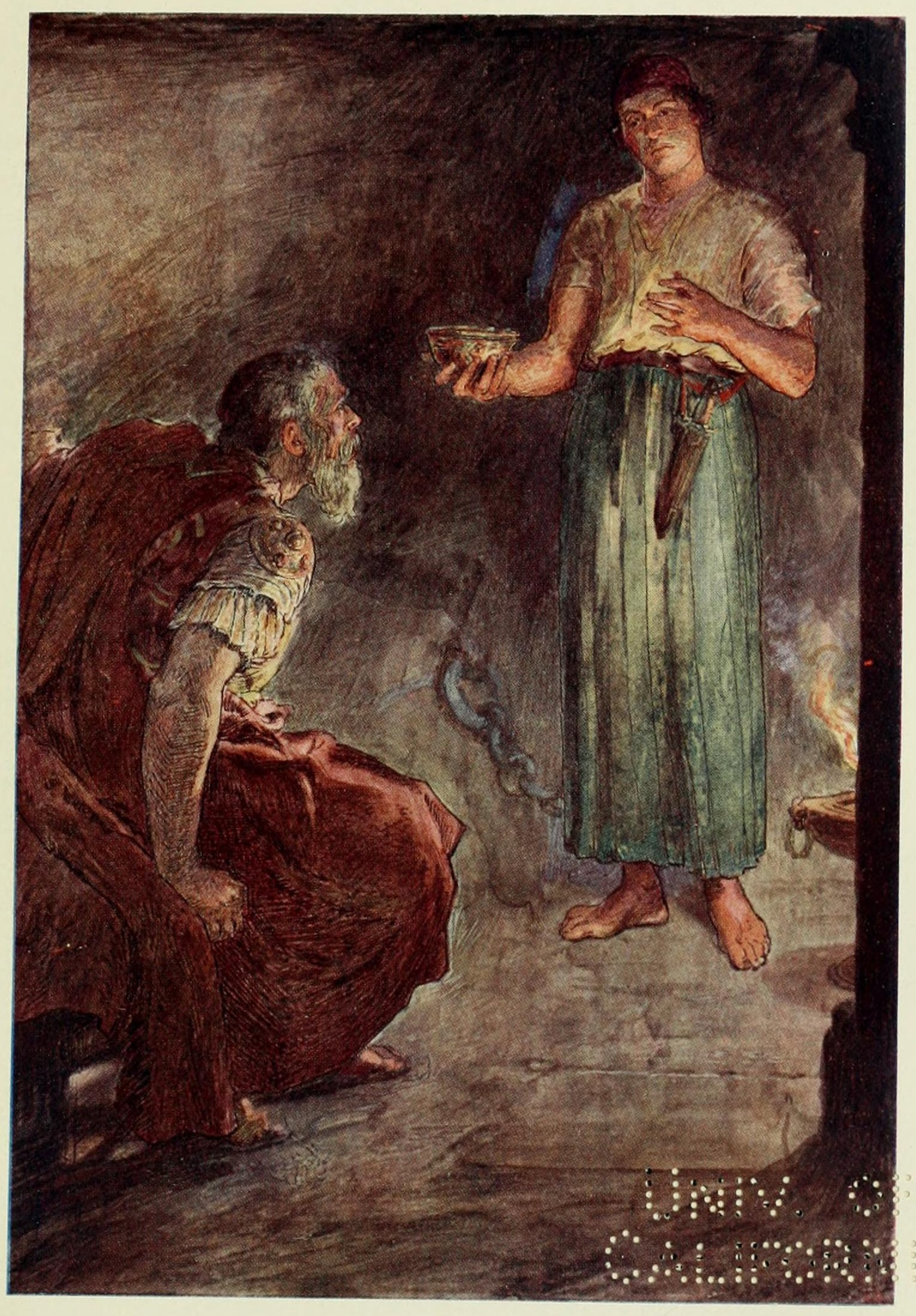
In Messenian captivity, Philopoemen is offered a drink of poison (as depicted in Children's Plutarch, 1900)

These actions provoked opposition even from Philopoemen's supporters in Sparta. As a result, his opponents in Sparta appealed directly to the Roman Senate, which repeatedly suggested solutions to the disagreements, all of which Philopoemen and his supporters rejected. In fact, Philopoemen and his supporters refused to recognise any Roman role in Achaean internal affairs as they argued that Rome had previously recognised the Achaean League's independence through a formal treaty.

This aggressive attitude towards Sparta and towards Rome split Achaean politics. However, Philopoemen died before these matters were resolved.

In 183 BC, Dinocrates, who strongly opposed Philopoemen, encouraged Messene to revolt against the League. After Dinocrates announced that he would capture Colonis, Philopoemen decided that he needed to subdue the rebellion.

In the ensuing battle, Philopoemen found himself behind the enemy's lines and was captured by the Messeneans after his horse threw him. He was then invited to drink poison to allow him to have what was then regarded as an honourable death.

On hearing of his death, the members of the Achaean League joined forces to capture Messene.

With his death, Philopoemen's body was cremated. At his public funeral, the historian Polybius carried the urn with Philopoemen's ashes and later wrote a biography and defended his memory in his Histories. Pausanias in his Description of Greece wrote that after Philopoemen's death, 'Greece ceased to bear good men'.

== Sources ==
- Polybius' Histories (x–xxiii) is the chief authority on the life of Philopoemen. These and a special treatise on Philopoemen (now lost) were used by Plutarch "Philopoemen", Pausanias (viii. 49SI), Livy (xxxi–xxxviii), and indirectly by Justin (xxx–xxxiv).
- Plutarch, The Lives, "Philopoemen"
- Polybius, The Histories of Polybius, Books X–XXXIII
- Junianus Justinus, Marcus Junianus Justinus, Epitome of the Philippic History of Pompeius Trogus, Books XXX–XXXIV
- The Oxford Classical Dictionary (1964)
- The Oxford History of the Classical World (1995)
- The Oxford Who's Who in the Classical World (2000)

Preceded by Cycliadas	Strategos of the Achaean League; 209 BC – 208 BC	Succeeded by Cycliadas
Preceded by Aristaenos of Megalopolis	Strategos of the Achaean League; 193 BC – 192 BC	Succeeded by Diophanes
Preceded by Diophanes	Strategos of the Achaean League; 191 BC – 186 BC	Succeeded by Aristaenos of Megalopolis
Preceded by Archon	Strategos of the Achaean League; 183 BC – 182 BC	Succeeded by Lykortas of Megalopolis
