= Diaeus =

Last strategos of the Archaean League

Diaeus of Megalopolis (Ancient Greek: Διαῖος, Diaios; died 146 BC) was the last strategos of the Achaian League in ancient Greece before the League was disbanded by the Romans. He served as the League's general from 150 to 149 BC and from 148 BC until his death.

== Dispute with the Lacedaemonians ==
Diaios was probably a son of Diophanes of Megalopolis, who had been a successful general of the Achaian League in 192/91 BC and who was himself the son of another Diaios. A member of the Arkadian aristocracy in the Achaian confederation, which comprised by then the entire Peloponnese, the younger Diaios was elected strategos of the Achaian League in 150 BC, succeeding Menalkidas of Sparta. Menalkidas had been charged by Kallikrates of Leontion with a capital offence, but saved himself by gaining the support of Diaios, whom he bribed with three talents. Diaios was generally blamed for this and, trying to divert public attention away from his own conduct, he sought a quarrel with Lakedaimon.

The Lakedaimonians had appealed to the Roman senate over the possession of some disputed land. In response, the Roman senate had said that decisions on all causes, except those of life and death, rested with the great council of the Achaians. Diaios decided to ignore the exception included in the Roman response.

The Lakedaimonians accused him of lying and the dispute led to war. However, the Lakedaimonians found themselves no match for the Achaians, and they sought to negotiate. Diaios, affirming that his hostility was not directed against Sparta as a whole, but against those who had caused the disagreement, arranged for the banishment of 24 of Sparta's principal citizens. These men fled to Rome and sought Rome's refuge and protection. Diaios travelled to Rome to oppose their claims, together with Kallikrates, who died along the way.

The cause of the Spartan exiles was supported by Menalkides, who assured the Spartans, on his return, that the Romans had declared in favour of their independence, while an equally positive assurance to the opposite effect was given by Diaios to the Achaians. In truth, the Senate had made no final decision, but had promised to send commissioners to settle the dispute.

== War with Rome ==
In 148 BC, war was renewed between the parties despite such action being prohibited by the Romans. However, Diaios, who was again general of the Achaean league in 147 BC, did seek to obey Rome's prohibition by endeavouring to bring over the towns around Sparta by negotiation. When the decree of the Romans arrived (see Achaean War), which severed Sparta and several other states from the Achaian league, Diaios took a leading part in building Achaian indignation and in urging them to the acts of violence which caused war with Rome.

In autumn 147 BC, Diaios was succeeded as general of the Achaian league by Kritolaos. But the death of the latter before the expiration of his year in that office once more placed Diaios in the key position. (This outcome was based on the law of the Achaians, which provided in such cases that the predecessor of the deceased should resume his authority.) The size of Diaios' army was increased with emancipated slaves and by the levy of the citizens, which Diaios enforced strictly, though not impartially.

In the resulting action, Diaios acted unwisely in dividing his forces. He sent some of them to garrison Megara and to check the advance of the Romans. Diaios himself established his quarters in Corinth, and Metellus, the Roman general, advancing towards Corinth, sent forward ambassadors to offer terms. But Diaios threw them into prison (though he afterwards released them for the bribe of a talent). Diaios then had Sosikrates, the lieutenant-general, as well as Philinos of Corinth, tortured to death for having recommended negotiation with the Romans.

== Cessation of the Achaean League ==
Being defeated by Lucius Mummius Achaicus before the walls of the city in the Battle of Corinth (146 BC), Diaios made no further attempt to defend the city, but fled to Megalopolis, where he slew his wife to prevent her being captured by the enemy and then killed himself by poisoning. His death marked the end of the Achaian League as it was then dissolved by Lucius Mummius.

Preceded by Menalkidas of Sparta	Strategos of the Achaean League; 150–146 BC	Achaean League dissolved by Lucius Mummius
