= Quintus Caecilius Metellus Macedonicus =

Roman general and statesman (c. 188 –116/5 BC)

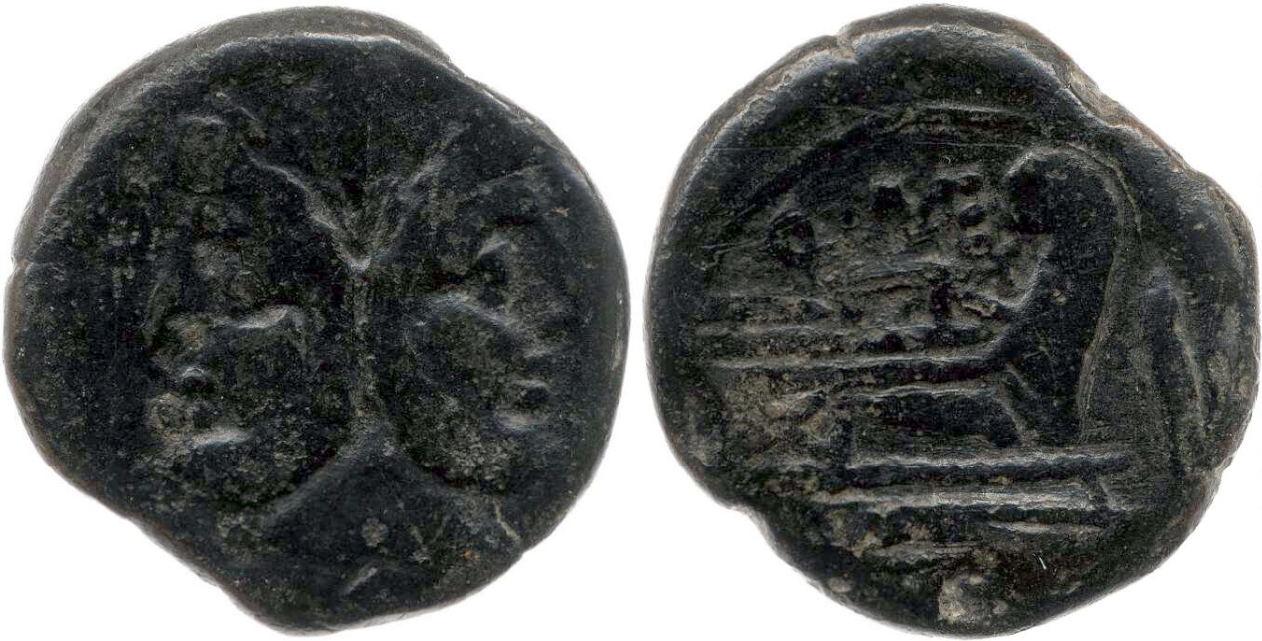
Coin minted by Q. Caecilius Metellus, c. 155–149 BC.

Quintus Caecilius Metellus Macedonicus (c. 188 BC – 116 BC/115 BC) was a statesman and general of the Roman Republic during the second century BC. He was praetor in 148 BC, consul in 143 BC, the Proconsul of Hispania Citerior in 142 BC and censor in 131 BC. He got his agnomen, Macedonicus, for his victory over the Macedonians in the Fourth Macedonian War.

== Career ==
=== Fourth Macedonian War ===
In 148 BC, as a praetor, he led Roman troops into victory over Andriscus twice. Andriscus was a self-proclaimed pretender to the Macedonian throne who claimed to be son of Perseus, last king of the Antigonid dynasty. Andriscus had risen against Rome intending to liberate Macedonia with an army recruited from Thrace. Under Metellus' authority Macedonia was reduced and made a Roman province. For that he was awarded the agnomen Macedonicus, and since then introduced the Clypeus Macedoniccus in his family's medals.

=== Achaean War ===
In 146 BC, he defeated Critolaos of Megalopolis at the Battle of Scarpheia and the Arcadians at Chaeronea but Metellus was then sent to fight in the Achaean War to avenge an insult offered to a Roman Embassy at Corinth. He fought under the command of consul Lucius Mummius Achaicus whose ultimate victory in the war against the Achaean League delayed Macedonicus from celebrating immediately the honours of the Triumph which his success at the battle of Scarpheia merited. On his return to Italy he received the honour of a triumph and the title Macedonicus. At some point after this, he built the Portico of Metellus (Porticus Metelli) beside the Circus Flaminius in the southern Campus Martius, which contained two temples: one dedicated to Jupiter Stator and one dedicated to Juno. Metellus is generally agreed to have been responsible for the building of the temple to Jupiter; it is disputed whether he also constructed the temple to Juno. These were the first marble temples in Rome, and Metellus ornamented them with Lysippus's equestrian statues of Alexander the Great's generals.

=== Numantine War ===
In 143-142 BC, when consul, he campaigned against the Celtiberians in central Hispania during the Numantine War, defeating the Arevaci, Lusones, Belli, Titii and the Vaccaei. He did not confront the city of Numantia, which then became the focus of the war and which resisted for ten years.

=== Politics ===
In 133 BC, he gave a speech attacking Tiberius Gracchus regarding that tribune's plan to bypass the traditional prerogative of the senate and keep the vast fortune of the recently deceased Attalus III of Pergamon under the control of the Plebeian Assembly. Attalus had bequeathed his kingdom to the people of Rome.

Metellus was elected censor in 131 BC, boldly pledging to halt the growing degradation of Roman custom. In a speech which he delivered at his appointment, he proposed that matrimony was to be mandatory for all citizens, in order to put an end to the libertine behaviour then already widespread. A century later Augustus caused this speech to be read at the Senate and published as an edict for the knowledge and regeneration of the Roman People. His moralizing efforts awakened strong popular opposition, led by the tribune Gaius Atinius Labeo Macerio whom he had previously expelled from the Senate. He was almost killed by the mob on the Tarpeian Rock.

Later there were some disagreements between him and Scipio Aemilianus, but he never lost sight of the merits of this adversary, whose death he mourned, ordering his sons to transport Aemilianus' body to the crematory pyre.

He died in 116/115 BC. Contemporary and later sources describe him as a prominent Roman who held numerous civil and military offices and had a large family of four sons who attained consulship his two sons-in-law, Publius Cornelius Scipio Nasica and Gaius Servilius Vatia would also attain the consulship.

== Family ==
He was the oldest son of Quintus Caecilius Metellus and grandson of Lucius Caecilius Metellus.

He was the father of:

- Quintus Caecilius Metellus Balearicus
- Lucius Caecilius Metellus Diadematus
- Marcus Caecilius Metellus
- Gaius Caecilius Metellus Caprarius
- Caecilia Metella, born c. 170 BC, wife of Publius Cornelius Scipio Nasica
- Caecilia Metella, born c. 170 BC, wife of Gaius Servilius Vatia
- Caecilia Metella, wife of Quintus Servilius Caepio

== In popular culture ==
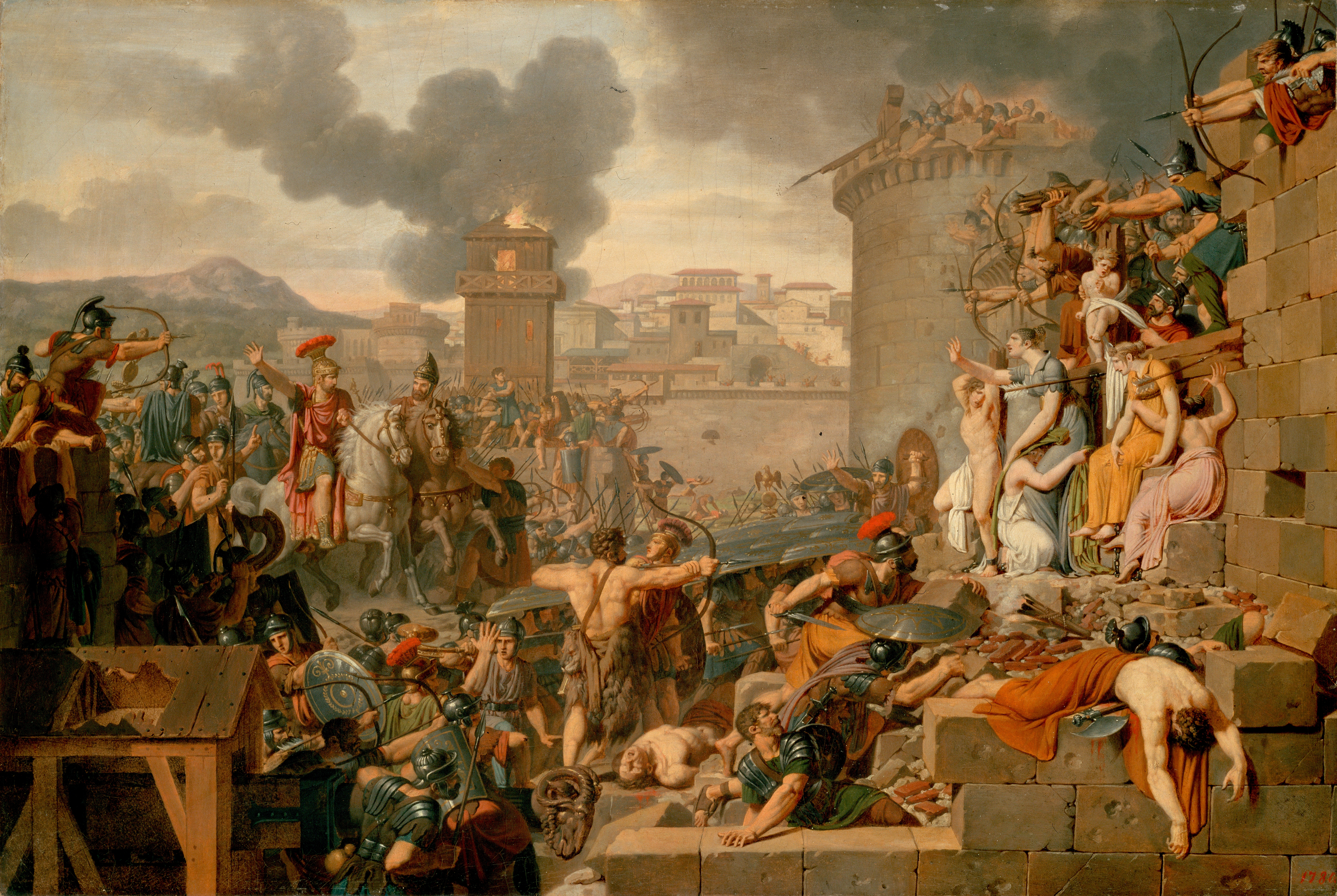
Metellus raising the siege, now at the Hermitage Museum in St. Petersburg.

Metellus was played by Gordon Mitchell in the 1961 film The Centurion.

"Metellus raising the siege", a painting by Armand-Charles Caraffe, commemorates the legend of Metellus lifting the siege of Centobrigia in 142 BC, in order to spare the lives of innocents.

== Sources ==
- UNRV.com
- Stockton, David. The Gracchi, Oxford University Press, Oxford ENG; 1979.

=== Attribution ===
Political offices
Preceded by Servius Sulpicius Galba; Lucius Aurelius Cotta	Roman consul 143 BC with Appius Claudius Pulcher	Succeeded by Lucius Caecilius Metellus Calvus; Quintus Fabius Maximus Servilianus
Preceded by Appius Claudius Pulcher; Quintus Fulvius Nobilior	Roman censor 131 BC with Quintus Pompeius	Succeeded by Gnaeus Servilius Caepio; Lucius Cassius Longinus Ravilla
