= Achaean League =

Confederation of ancient Greek city-states (280–146 BC)

League of the Achaeans Κοινὸν τῶν Ἀχαιῶν Koinon ton Achaion
- 280 BC–146 BC
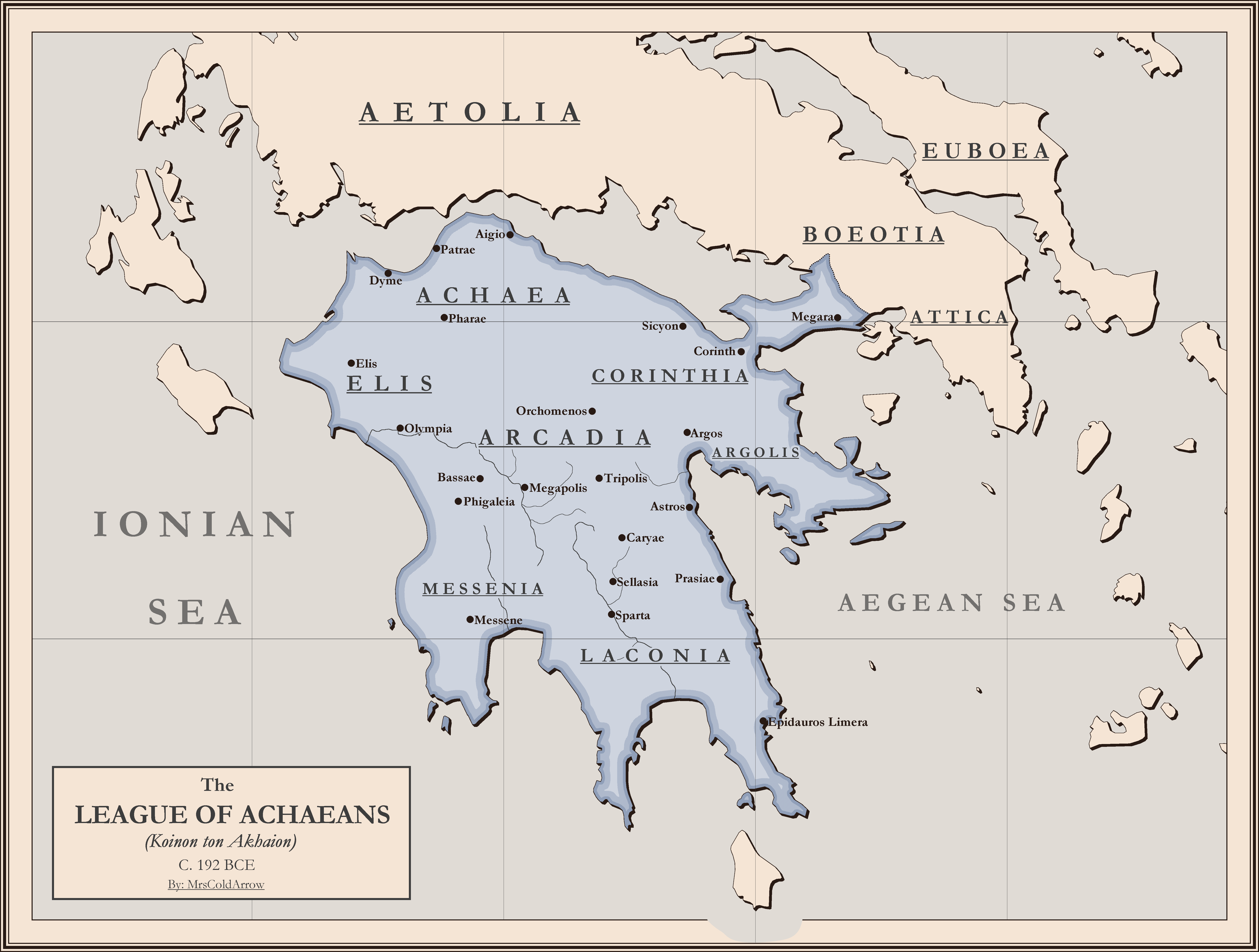
- Achaean League in 192 BC
- Capital: Aigion (meeting place)
- Common languages: Achaean Doric Koine, Koine Greek
- Religion: Ancient Greek religion
- Government: Confederal republic
- Strategos
- Legislature: Achaean assembly
- Historical era: Classical Antiquity
  - Re-founded: 280 BC
  - Conquered by the Roman Republic in the Achaean War: 146 BC
- Currency: Drachma
Preceded by	Succeeded by
League of Corinth; Arcadian League	Achaea (Roman province)
- Today part of: Greece

Towns of Ancient Achaia

The Achaean League (Ancient Greek: Κοινὸν τῶν Ἀχαιῶν, romanized: Koinon ton Akhaion, lit. 'League of Achaeans') was a Hellenistic-era confederation of Greek city-states on the northern and central Peloponnese. The league was named after the region of Achaea in the northwestern Peloponnese, which formed its original core. The first league was formed in the fifth century BC. Although the first Achaean League is much less well documented than its later revival, it maintained a recognizable federal structure through the early Hellenistic period, but later fell into a period of dormancy under growing Macedonian influence. The more famous second Achaean League was established in 280 BC. It allied with Antigonid Macedon at the Cleomenean War, Social War and First Macedonian War against the Aetolian League and Sparta. Its most successful leader was Philopoemen who forced Sparta to join the League. The league allied with the Roman Republic during the Second Macedonian War and the Aetolian War. The Achaean War ended the League's political independence in 146 BC, but did not mark the end of the League itself. Its federal organization was subsequently reorganized under Roman rule, and the League continued to function for centuries.

The League represents the most successful attempt by the Greek city-states to develop a form of federalism, which balanced the need for collective action with the desire for local autonomy. Through the writings of the Achaean historian and statesman Polybius, this structure has had an influence on the constitution of the United States and other modern federal states.

== History ==
=== Classical league ===
The first Achaean League became active in the fifth century in the northwestern Peloponnese. Its earliest organizational structure remains partly obscure, but new evidence has illuminated aspects of its government. A fragmentary inscription discovered at Aegium, dating to the fourth or possibly the very beginning of the third century BC, attests to a developed federal system that included a boule (federal council) and a board of damiourgoi (federal magistrates).

The ancient capital of the league was Helike, but after the catastrophic destruction of that city by an earthquake and tsunami in 373 BC, Aegium subsequently assumed that role. Xenophon's Hellenica reports that Achaea underwent a democratic revolution in 367 and the previous ruling class was exiled.

Although it was once widely claimed that Alexander the Great dissolved the Achaean League in 324 BC, the passage in Hypereides (Against Demosthenes 18) supposed to reference such a dissolution is now widely understood to be too ambiguous to support that interpretation. The idea is further undermined by the continued political activity of Achaea and Arcadia during the Lamian War, when they refused to join the Greeks while Boeotia did support Antipater.

The league continued to exist into the early Hellenistic period and is attested in 302 BC, when the Achaeans were listed among the members of the League of Corinth revived by Demetrius Poliorcetes. In the years following, Macedonian influence intensified in some Achaean cities while others became ruled by tyrants. This period of increasing external control appears to have been linked to Demetrius’ change in policy, signalled by his capture and fortification of Athens in 294 BC, with the planting of garrisons in Achaean cities likely occurring shortly thereafter.

Polybius records that during this time, tyrannies were established in cities such as Ceryneia and Bura, and a garrison was stationed at Aegium. Despite this interference, there is no indication that the Achaean League was formally dissolved. Historian Jakob Larsen suggests that the confederacy's federal institutions effectively ceased to operate because so many of its member cities were under external control. This state of suspension allowed the league to resume its functions later without the need for significant constitutional changes, suggesting that some mutual understanding among the cities facilitated its reactivation when conditions allowed.

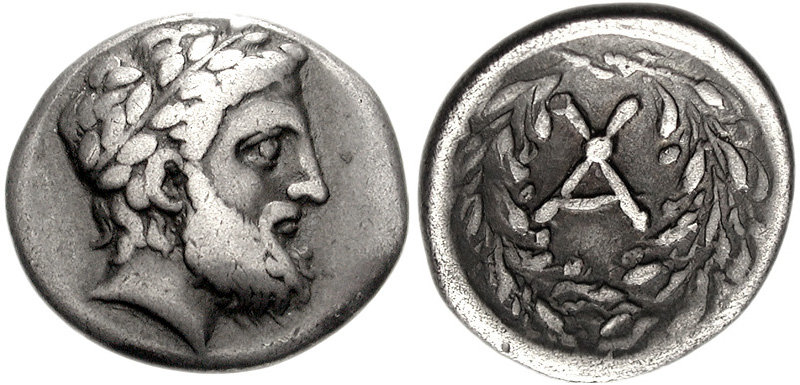
ACHAIA, Achaian League. Anonymous. Circa 250 BC. AR Hemidrachm (16mm, 2.64 g, 2h). Laureate head of Zeus right / AX monogram in wreath.

=== Hellenistic league ===
The regional Achaean League was revived in 281/0 BC by the communities of Dyme, Patrae, Pharae and Tritaea, joined in 275 by Aegium, which controlled the important sanctuary of Zeus Homarios. The league grew quickly to include the entire Achaean heartland, and after a decade it had ten or eleven members. The key moment for the League's transformation into a major power came in 251, when Aratus, the exiled son of a former magistrate of Sicyon, overthrew the tyranny in his native city and brought it into the Achaean League. Since the Sicyonians were of Dorian and Ionian origin, their inclusion opened the League for other national elements. Aratus, then only twenty years old, rapidly became the leading politician of the League. In the thirty two years between 245 and his death in 213, Aratus would hold the office of general a total of sixteen times.

At this time, Central Greece and the Peloponnese were dominated by the Macedonian Kingdom of Antigonus II Gonatas who maintained garrisons at key strategic points such as Chalcis, Piraeus and Acrocorinth, the so-called "fetters of Greece". In other cities of the Peloponnese, namely Argos, Orchomenus, and Megalopolis, Antigonus had installed friendly rulers who were perceived as tyrants by the Achaeans. Aratus, whose father had been killed by one, called for the liberation of these cities and secured financial support for the League from Ptolemy II of Egypt, an enemy of the Antigonids. He then used the money to challenge the Macedonian hold on the Peloponnese.

Aratus' greatest success came when he captured Corinth and the fortress of Acrocorinth in 243 BC in a daring night attack. This effectively blocked Macedonian access to the Peloponnese by land, isolating their allies at Megalopolis and Argos. In light of this success, a number of Greek communities, including Epidaurus and Megara joined the League and Ptolemy III increased Egypt's support for the Achaeans, being elected as the League's hegemon (leader) in return. Antigonus Gonatas finally made peace with the Achaean League in a treaty of 240 BC, ceding the territories that he had lost in Greece.

The increased size of the league meant a bigger citizen army and more wealth, which was used to hire mercenaries, but it also led to hostility from the remaining independent Greek states, especially Elis, the Aetolian League and Sparta, which perceived the Achaeans as a threat. Corinth was followed by Megalopolis in 235 BC and Argos in 229 BC. However the league soon ran into difficulties with the revived Sparta of Cleomenes III. Aratus was forced to call in the aid of the Macedonian King, Antigonus III Doson, who defeated Cleomenes at Sellasia. Antigonus Doson re-established Macedonian control over much of the region. In 229 BC, the Achaean League participated in a naval battle off the island of Paxos in a coalition with Korkyra and the Aetolian League, and were defeated by a coalition of Illyrians and Acarnanians; as a result, the Korkyreans were forced to accept an Illyrian garrison in their city, which was put under the command of Demetrius of Pharos.

In 220 BC, the Achaean League entered into a war against the Aetolian League, which was called the "Social War". The young king Philip V of Macedon sided with the Achaeans and called for a Panhellenic conference in Corinth, where the Aetolian aggression was condemned. After Aratus's death, however, the League joined Rome in the Second Macedonian War (200–196 BC), which broke Macedonian power in mainland Greece. The Achaean League was one of the main beneficiaries. Under the leadership of Philopoemen, the League was able to finally defeat a heavily weakened Sparta and take control of the entire Peloponnese.

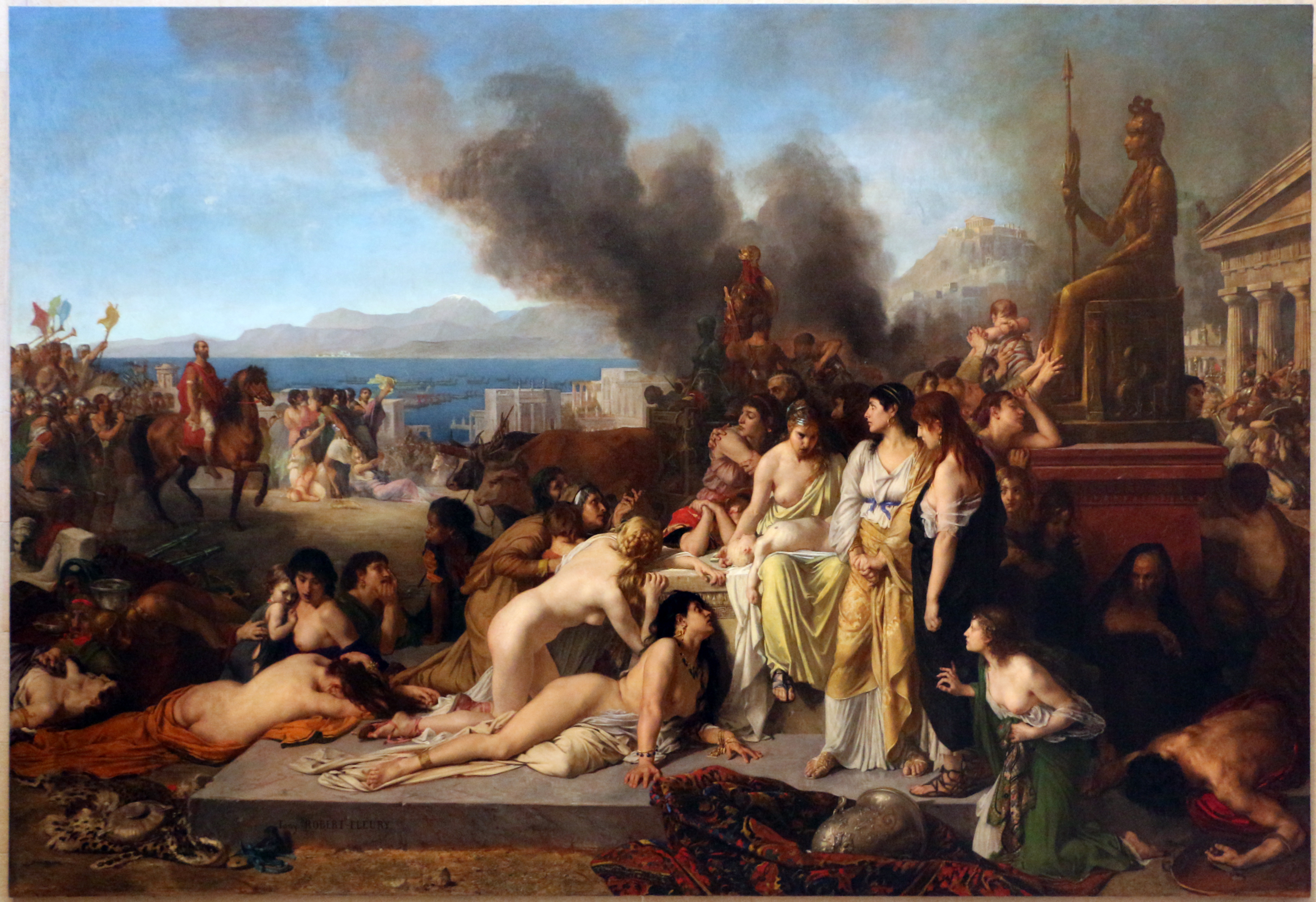
Last Day of Corinth, Tony Robert-Fleury, 1870

The League's dominance was not to last long, however. During the Third Macedonian War (171–168 BC), the League flirted with the idea of an alliance with Perseus of Macedon, and the Romans punished it by taking several hostages to ensure good behavior, including Polybius, the Hellenistic historian who subsequently wrote about the rise of the Roman Republic. In 146 BC, the League's relations with Rome completely collapsed, leading to the Achaean War. The Romans under Lucius Mummius defeated the Achaeans at the Battle of Corinth and razed Corinth, ending the League's political independence and ushering in the Roman era. Its federal organization was subsequently restored or reorganized under Roman rule. G. T. Griffith has written that the Achaean War was "a hopeless enterprise for the Achaeans, badly led and backed by no adequate reserves of money or men." Lucius Mummius received the agnomen Achaicus ("conqueror of Achaea") for his role.

=== Roman era ===
Although the Achaean League lost its political independence following its defeat by Rome in 146 BC, Achaean federal organization was subsequently restored and continued under Roman rule in a reduced form. Pausanias states that the Romans initially abolished the federal councils but restored them "not many years later". The precise nature of this restoration is disputed. J. A. O. Larsen argued that a smaller Achaean confederacy was reconstituted a few years after 146 BC, while Thomas Schwertfeger argued that the League had already been reorganized by 146/145 BC with a different constitution and membership. Robert Kallet-Marx similarly argued that the Roman settlement did not formally dissolve the Greek leagues, although their activities had temporarily collapsed during the war. James Roy describes the post-146 BC organization as "a smaller version of the Achaian League" which was subsequently reconstituted and continued for centuries.

The Achaean League continued to be attested in epigraphic sources under Roman rule, retaining federal institutions and magistracies such as the strategos. In c. 120 BC, Achaeans of cities in the Peloponnese dedicated an honorary inscription to Olympian Zeus, after a military expedition with Gnaeus Domitius against the Galatians in Gallia Transalpina. In the Roman imperial period, the League continued to issue collective decrees and send embassies. A decree dated to AD 126 records an embassy to the emperor Hadrian during the tenure of Publius Egnatius Brachyllus as strategos. Another inscription from Tegea, dated to AD 218–235, honors Sextus Pompeius Menophanes as strategos and high priest for life of the League.

== Government ==
The government of the league consisted of an assembly of citizens, a smaller council, and a strategos (general).

The strategos (general) controlled the league's military forces. Originally, two strategoi held office simultaneously, but from 251, there was only one, who was elected annually by the assembly. Until 217 the strategos entered office in May; afterwards he assumed power at the beginning of winter. Individuals could hold the office more than once (and frequently did so), but not in consecutive years. The general was assisted in his duties by a board of ten demiourgoi, a secretary, a hipparch (cavalry commander), a navarch (admiral), and hypostrategoi (sub-generals commanding in military districts). The position of Hegemon (leader) was given to various Antigonid and Ptolemaic kings at various points in Achaean history. Ostensibly, the hegemon had ultimate command on land and sea, but in fact the position seems to have been an honorary position which obliged the holder to contribute money to the League and support the League's military ventures.

Ultimate decision-making power rested with the assembly (synodos), which was held at Aegium four times a year. All male citizens of communities belonging to the League were entitled to attend. Alongside the assembly there was a council (boule), which was open to citizen men over thirty years old. Special meetings (synkletoi) had to be called in order for the league to declare war, form an alliance, or receive official communications from the Macedonian king or (later) the Roman Republic.

The league was ostensibly a democracy, but control seems to have consistently rested with a small elite group who monopolised the generalship and other official positions. Given the difficulty of travelling to Aegium, assemblies were probably dominated by the wealthy.

== Army ==
The Achaean army was an army of the traditional hoplite type. From the 270s onwards however, much like the rest of Greece, the emergence of the shield known as the thyreos was incorporated into Greek warfare and a new type of troop was developed. Reforming their troops into thyreophoroi, the Achaean army was now composed of light troops. The thyreophoroi were a mixture of evolved peltasts and light hoplites, carrying the thureos shield, a thrusting spear and javelins. Plutarch says that they could be effective at a distance, but in close combat the narrow thureos shield disadvantaged them. He also says that their formation was ineffective, because it lacked inter-locked shields or a 'leveled line of spears'. Aratus, one of the major Achaean strategoi (generals) and statesmen was known for his use of light forces for irregular operations, a type of warfare suited to the thyreophoroi but not suited to operations in the open field.

The League in 217 decided to maintain a standing force of 8,000 mercenary foot and 500 mercenary cavalry, added to a picked citizen force of 3,000 infantry and 300 cavalry, of which 500 foot and 50 horse would come from Argos and the same amount from Megalopolis. Aratus also obtained 500 foot and 50 horse each from Taurion and the Messenians for defence of parts of the League open to attack via Laconia. The citizen infantry would have been armed as thyreophoroi, apart from the citizen light troops who would have been archers and slingers etc. This picked citizen force may well have existed before these so-called reforms, at least on an official basis, as we know of a similar elite force of the same size at the Battle of Sellasia in 222.

However, it was the Achaean general Philopoemen in 208 who changed the Achaean fighting style and weaponry to the Macedonian fashion. According to Plutarch, Philopoemen 'persuaded them to adopt long pike and heavy shield instead of spear and buckler, to protect their bodies with helmets and breastplates and greaves, and to practice stationary and steadfast fighting instead of the nimble movements of light-armed troops'. These 'reforms' were not necessarily new to some of the constituent cities of the League, as the city of Megalopolis had been given bronze shields and armed in the Macedonian fashion by Antigonus Doson for the Sellasia campaign many years before. Philopoemen then trained the new army how to fight with the new weapons and tactics and how to co-ordinate them with a new mercenary corps that was hired. He spent nearly 8 months of his term as strategos visiting, training and advising cities in this capacity. At the Battle of Mantinea in 207 BC the Achaean phalanx was positioned with intervals between the companies with lighter troops. This was a major attempt by Philopoemen to increase the flexibility of his phalanx. He may have picked up this tactic too from his experience at the Battle of Sellasia, where the phalanx of Antigonus Doson was also divided up with light/medium troops in between them. As well as reforming and re-organizing the infantry, Philopoemen also reformed the citizen cavalry. The cavalry was recruited, much like in other Greek states, from the rich and noble classes. Philopoemen organized the cavalry in lochoi, which usually in ancient military treatises means 'files', most probably of 8 men, grouped into dilochiai, a formation of double-files of 16 and so forth.

However, by the time of the Achaean War in 146 BC, the League's army had decreased in strength and efficiency. The League was even reduced to freeing and arming 12,000 slaves. This was probably due to the 2nd century BC decline in population. This may well account for the increased hiring of mercenaries, especially Cretans and Thracians.

== Members ==
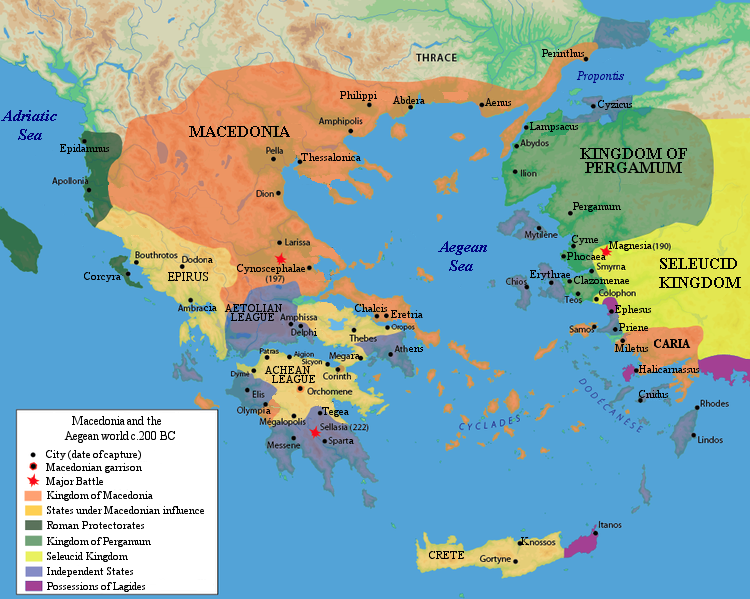
Territory of the Achaean League in 200 BC (excluding Boeotia).

The below are the original Peloponnesian members, except the ancient regions of Sparta, Elis and Messenia. Later Hypana in Elis, Corone, Messene, Sparta and Pagae in Attica were joined by conquest. In 223 BC, Megara in Attica deserted the Achaean League and joined the Boeotian Confederacy.

Besides many city-states on the Mainland joining the Achaean Federation, certain Mediterranean island city-states also became part of the federation. For example, Kydonia on Crete joined at some time after 219 BC.

The city of Helike had been an important member of the first Achaean League, but sank into the sea following a disastrous earthquake in 373 BC. The town of Olenus, also one of the twelve members of the first Achaean League, had been abandoned before 280 BC, but was sometimes counted as though still extant.

The dates in brackets indicate the year of first adhesion. Some cities had periods of separation or foreign occupation and later joined again.

=== From Achaea ===
- Dyme (281 BC)
- Patras (281 BC)
- Pharae (280 BC)
- Tritaia (280 BC)
- Aegium (275 BC)
- Boura (~ 270 BC)
- Keryneia (~ 270 BC)
- Leontion (~ 265 BC)
- Aegira (~ 265 BC)
- Pellene (~ 265 BC)
- Olenus (after 272 BC)
- Helike (before 373 BC)

=== From Corinthia ===
- Sicyon (251 BC)
- Corinth (243–224 BC, again 197 BC)
- Stymphalus
- Tenea

=== From Argolis ===
- Troezen (243 BC)
- Epidaurus (243 BC)
- Cleonae (235 BC)
- Argos (229 BC)
- Phlius (229 BC)
- Hermione (229 BC)
- Alea
- Asine

=== From Arcadia ===
From the ancient political geography of Arcadia, not totally compatible with modern Arcadia

- Megalopolis (235 BC)
- Mantineia (235/227 BC)
- Orchomenus (235 BC)
- Heraea (captured 236 BC)
- Caphyae (captured 228 BC)
- Tegea (223 BC)
- Psophis (218 BC)
- Lasion (218 BC)
- Alipheira
- Asea
- Callista
- Cleitor
- Dipaea
- Elisphasi
- Gortys
- Lusi
- Methydrium
- Pallantium
- Pheneus
- Phigaleia
- Teuthis
- Theisoa
- Thelpusa

=== From other regions ===
- Megara (243–223 BC / after 197 BC again)
- Aegina (228–211 BC)
- Kydonia (after 219 BC)
- Sparta (192 BC)
- Elis (191 BC)
- Messene (191/182 BC)
- Pleuron (167 BC)

== List of Strategoi (Generals) ==
- Margos of Keryneia 256–255 BC
- Aratus of Sicyon I 245–244 BC
- Aratus of Sicyon II 243–242 BC
- Aegialeas 242–241 BC (?)
- Aratus of Sicyon III 241–240 BC
- Aratus of Sicyon IV 239–238 BC
- Aratus of Sicyon V 237–236 BC
- Dioedas 236–235 BC (or 244–243 BC)
- Aratus of Sicyon VI 235–234 BC
- Lydiadas of Megalopolis I 234–233 BC
- Aratus of Sicyon VII 233–232 BC
- Lydiadas of Megalopolis II 232–231 BC
- Aratus of Sicyon VIII 231–230 BC
- Lydiadas of Megalopolis III 230–229 BC (Margos of Keryneia † was Navarch)
- Aratus of Sicyon IX 229–228 BC
- Aristomachos of Argos 228–227 BC
- Aratus of Sicyon X 227–226 BC (Lydiadas of Megalopolis † was Hipparch)
- Hyperbatas 226–225 BC
- Timoxenos 225–224 BC (Aratus of Sicyon held the exceptional office of strategos autokrator)
- Aratus of Sicyon XI 224–223 BC
- Timoxenos 223–222 BC (?)
- Aratus of Sicyon XII 222–221 BC
- Timoxenos 221–220 BC
- Aratus of Sicyon XIII 220–219 BC
- Aratus the Younger of Sicyon 219–218 BC (Mikkos of Dyme was Hypostrategos)
- Epiratos of Pharae 218–217 BC
- Aratus of Sicyon XIV 217–216 BC (Demodokos was Hipparch, Lykos of Pharae was Hypostrategos)
- Timoxenos 216–215 BC
- Aratus of Sicyon XV 215–214 BC
- Aratus of Sicyon XVI 213 BC (Aratus died before the end of the year)
- Euryleon of Aegium 211–210 BC
- Kykliadas of Pharae 210–209 BC (Philopoemen of Megalopolis was Hipparch)
- Philopoemen of Megalopolis I 209–208 BC
- Nikias 208–207 BC (Aristaenos of Dyme was Hipparch)
- Philopoemen of Megalopolis II 207–206 BC
- Lysippos 202–201 BC (?)
- Philopoemen of Megalopolis III 201–200 BC
- Kykliadas of Pharae 200–199 BC
- Aristainos of Megalopolis 199–198 BC
- Nikostratos of Achaia 198–197 BC
- Theoxenos 197–196 BC (?)
- Aristainos of Megalopolis 195–194 BC
- Philopoemen of Megalopolis IV 193–192 BC (Teison of Patras was Navarch)
- Diophanes of Megalopolis 192–191 BC
- Philopoemen of Megalopolis V 191–190 BC
- Philopoemen of Megalopolis VI 189–188 BC
- Philopoemen of Megalopolis VII 187–186 BC
- Aristainos of Megalopolis 186–185 BC
- Lycortas of Megalopolis 185–184 BC
- Archon of Aegeira 184–183 BC
- Philopoemen of Megalopolis VIII 183–182 BC † (Lycortas of Megalopolis was Hipparch)
- Lycortas of Megalopolis 182–181 BC
- Hyperbatos 181–180 BC
- Kallikrates of Leontion 180–179 BC
- Apollonidas of Sicyon ~ 178 BC
- Aenetidas ~ 176 BC
- Xenarchus 175–174 BC
- Archon of Aegeira 172–171 BC
- Archon of Aegeira 170–169 BC (Polybius was Hipparch)
- Menalkidas of Sparta 151–150 BC
- Diaeos of Megalopolis 150–149 BC
- Damokritos 149–148 BC
- Diaeos of Megalopolis 148–147 BC
- Kritolaos of Megalopolis 147–146 BC † (replaced by his predecessor)
- Diaeos of Megalopolis 146 BC (Sosikrates was Hipparch)

== Major Battles ==
- Battle of Sellasia
- Lyttian War
- Achaean War

== See also ==
- Koinon
- Achaea (disambiguation)
- Peloponnese
