= Spartan army =

Army of the ancient Greek city-state of Sparta

Army of Sparta
- Lambda (Λ), the eleventh letter of the Greek alphabet, was long thought to be the symbol that Spartan soldiers displayed on their shields, whilst most know it as a Lambda, it was a symbol of Sparta and what surrounded the state. In reality, the lambda was displayed on shields of auxiliary troops, armed and funded by Sparta.
- Founded: 8th century BC
- Disbanded: 2nd century BC
- Country: Sparta
- Type: Army

Commanders
- Notable commanders: Kings of Sparta

The Spartan army was the principal ground force of Sparta. It stood at the center of the ancient Greek city-state, consisting of citizens trained in the disciplines and honour of a warrior society. Subjected to military drills since early manhood, the Spartans became one of the most feared and formidable military forces in the Greek world, attaining legendary status in their wars against Persia. At the height of Sparta's power—between the 6th and 4th centuries BC—other Greeks commonly accepted that "one Spartan was worth several men of any other state."

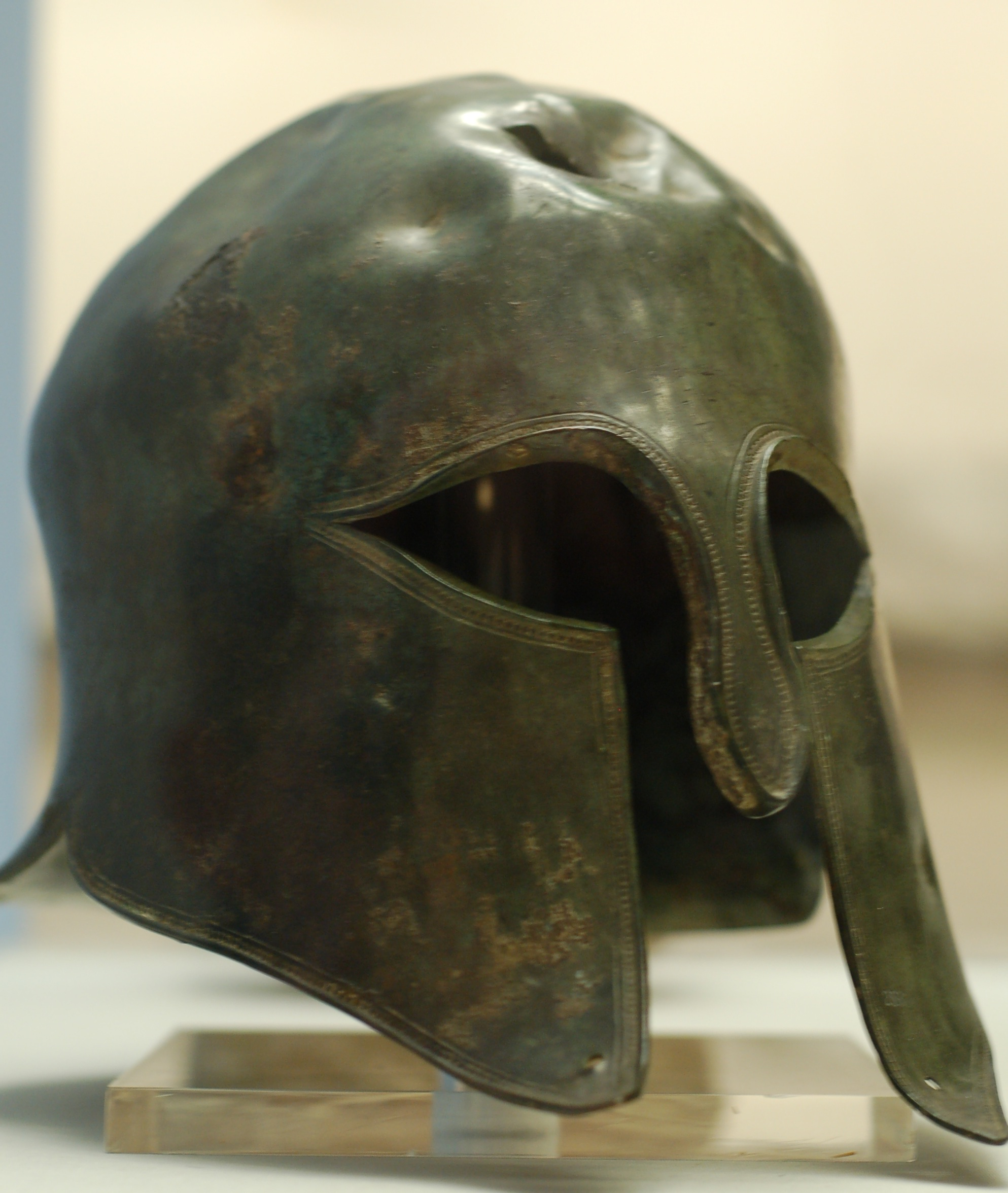
A Corinthian helmet on display at the British Museum. The helmet is damaged, with its top having sustained a blow.

Tradition states that the semi-mythical Spartan legislator Lycurgus first founded the iconic army. Referring to Sparta as having a "wall of men, instead of bricks," he proposed reforming the Spartan society to develop a military-focused lifestyle following "proper virtues" such as equality for the male citizens, austerity, strength, and fitness. Spartan boys deemed strong enough entered the agoge regime at the age of seven, undergoing intense and rigorous military training. Their education focused primarily on fostering cunningness, practicing sports and war tactics, and also included learning about poetry, music, academics, and sometimes politics. Those who passed the agoge by the age of 30 achieved full Spartan citizenship.

In modern times, the term "Spartan" is frequently an expression that describes simplicity by design. In the classical era, "Lacedaemonian" or "Laconian" was used for attribution, referring to the region of the city-state instead of one of the decentralized settlements called Sparta. From this derives the already ancient term "Laconic," and is related to expressions such as "Laconic phrase" or "Laconophilia."

== History ==
=== Mycenaean age ===
The first reference to the Spartans at war is in the Iliad, in which they featured among the other Greek contingents. Like the rest of the Mycenaean-era armies, it was depicted as composed mainly of infantry, equipped with short swords, spears, and Dipylon-type shields ("8"-shaped simple round bronze shields).

In a battle, each opposing army would try to fight through the other line on the right (strong or deep) side and then turn left; wherefore they would be able to attack the vulnerable flank. When this happened, as a rule, it would cause the army to be routed. The fleeing enemy was put to the sword only as far as the field of the battle extended. The outcome of this one battle would determine the outcome of a particular issue. In the Golden Age of War, defeated armies were not massacred; they fled back to their city and conceded the victors' superiority. It wasn't until after the Peloponnesian War that battles countenanced indiscriminate slaughter, enslavement and depredations among the Greeks.

War chariots were used by the elite, but unlike their counterparts in the Middle East, they appear to have been used for transport, with the warrior dismounting to fight on foot and then remounting to withdraw from combat. However, some accounts show warriors throwing their spear from the chariot before dismounting.

=== Archaic Age and expansion ===
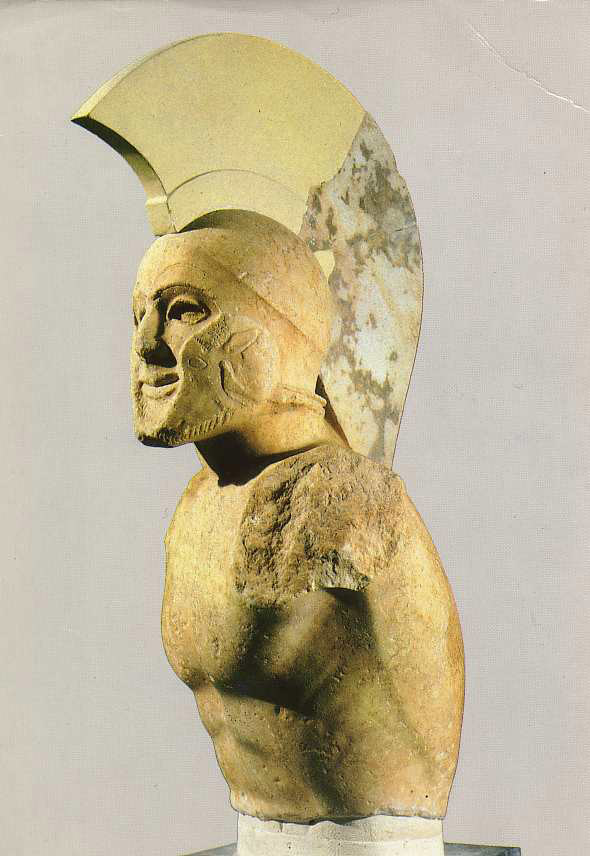
Marble statue of a helmed hoplite (5th century BC), possibly Leonidas (Archaeological Museum of Sparta, Greece)

Like much of Greece, Mycenaean Sparta was engulfed in the Dorian invasions, which ended the Mycenaean civilization and ushered in the so-called "Greek Dark Ages." During this time, Sparta (or Lacedaemon) was merely a Doric village on the banks of the River Eurotas in Laconia. However, in the early 8th century BC, Spartan society transformed. Later traditions ascribed the reforms to the possibly mythical figure of Lycurgus, who created new institutions and established the Spartan state's military nature. This Spartan Constitution remained virtually unchanged for five centuries. From c. 750 BC, Sparta embarked on a steady expansion, first by subduing Amyclae and the other Laconian settlements. Later, during the First Messenian War, they conquered the fertile country of Messenia. By the beginning of the 7th century BC, Sparta was, along with Argos, the Peloponnese's dominant power.

=== Establishment of Spartan hegemony over the Peloponnese ===
Inevitably, Sparta and Argos collided. Initial Argive successes, such as the victory at the Battle of Hysiae in 669 BC, led to the Messenians' uprising. This internal conflict tied down the Spartan army for almost 20 years. However, over the course of the 6th century, Sparta secured her control of the Peloponnese peninsula. The Spartans forced Arcadia into recognizing their power; Argos lost Cynuria (the South Eastern coast of the Peloponnese) in about 546 and suffered a further crippling blow from Cleomenes I at the Battle of Sepeia in 494. Repeated expeditions against tyrannical regimes during this period throughout Greece also considerably raised the Spartans' prestige. By the early 5th century, Sparta was the unchallenged master in southern Greece, as the leading power (hegemon) of the newly established Peloponnesian League (which was more characteristically known to its contemporaries as "the Lacedaemonians and their allies").

=== Persian and Peloponnesian Wars ===
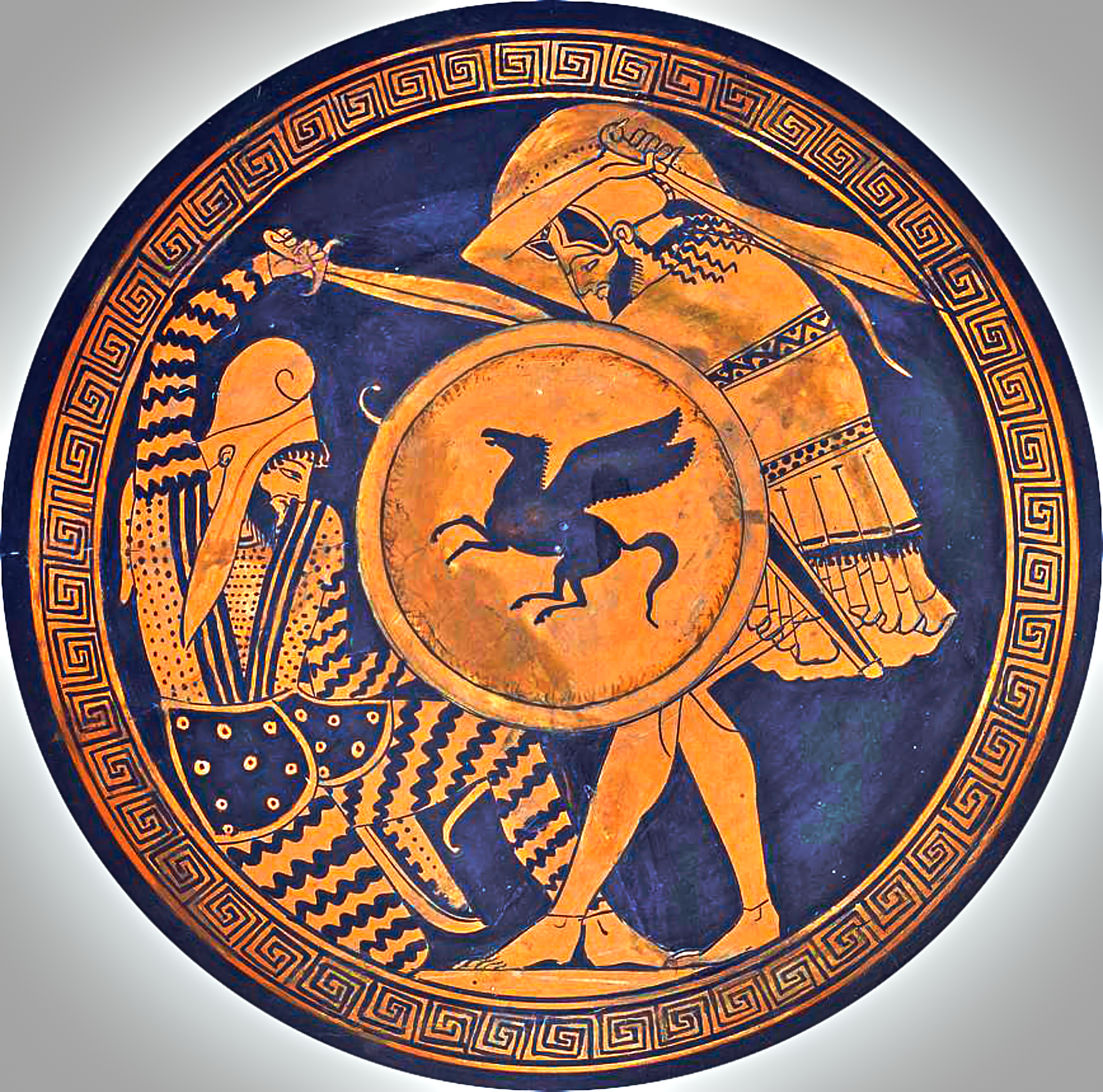
Greek hoplite besting a Persian, on the tondo of a kylix drinking cup from the 5th century BC (National Archaeological Museum of Athens)

By the late 6th century BC, Sparta was recognized as the preeminent Greek polis. King Croesus of Lydia established an alliance with the Spartans, and later, the Greek cities of Asia Minor appealed to them for help during the Ionian Revolt. During the second Persian invasion of Greece, under Xerxes, Sparta was assigned the overall leadership of Greek forces on both land and sea. The Spartans played a crucial role in the repulsion of the invasion, notably at the battles of Thermopylae and Plataea. However, during the aftermath, because of the plotting of Pausanias with the Persians and their unwillingness to campaign too far from home, the Spartans withdrew into relative isolation. The power vacuum resulted in Athens' rise to power, who became the lead in the continued effort against the Persians. This isolationist tendency was further reinforced by some of her allies' revolts and a great earthquake in 464, which was followed by a large scale revolt of the Messenian helots.

Athens' parallel rise as a significant power in Greece led to friction between herself with Sparta and two large-scale conflicts (the First and Second Peloponnesian Wars), which devastated Greece. Sparta suffered several defeats during these wars, including, for the first time, the surrender of an entire Spartan unit at Sphacteria in 425 BC. Still, it ultimately emerged victorious, primarily through the aid it received from the Persians. Under its admiral Lysander, the Persian-funded Peloponnesian fleet captured the Athenian alliance cities, and a decisive naval victory at Aegospotami forced Athens to capitulate. The Athenian defeat established Sparta and its military forces in a dominant position in Greece.

=== End of Hegemony ===
Spartan ascendancy did not last long. By the end of the 5th century BC, Sparta had suffered severe casualties in the Peloponnesian Wars, and its conservative and narrow mentality alienated many of its former allies. At the same time, its military class – the Spartiate caste – was in decline for several reasons:

- Firstly, the population declined due to Sparta's frequent wars in the late 5th century. Since Spartiates were required to marry late, birth rates also remained low, making it difficult to replace their losses from battles.
- Secondly, one could be demoted from the Spartiate status for several reasons, such as cowardice in battle or the inability to pay for membership in the syssitia. Failure to pay became such an increasingly severe problem because commercial activities had started to develop in Sparta. However, commerce had become uncontrollable, leading to the complete ban of commerce in Sparta, resulting in fewer ways of earning income. Consequently, some Spartiates had to sell the land from which they made their livelihood. As the constitution made no provisions for promotion to the Spartiate caste, numbers gradually dwindled.

As Sparta's military power waned, Thebes also repeatedly challenged its authority. The ensuing Corinthian War led to the humiliating Peace of Antalcidas that destroyed Sparta's reputation as the protector of Greek city-states' independence. At the same time, Spartan military prestige suffered a severe blow when a mora of 600 men was defeated by peltasts (light infantry) under the command of the Athenian general Iphicrates. Spartan authority finally collapsed after their disastrous defeat at the Battle of Leuctra by the Thebans under the leadership of Epaminondas in 371 BC. The battle killed a large number of Spartiates, and resulted in the loss of the fertile Messenia region.

== Army organization ==
=== Social structure ===
"... the allies of the Lacedaemonians were offended at Agesilaus, because ... they themselves [provided] so many [soldiers], and the Lacedaemonians, whom they followed, so few. ... Agesilaus, wishing to refute their argument with numbers ... ordered all the allies to sit down by themselves promiscuously, the Lacedaemonians apart by themselves. Then his herald called upon the potters to stand up first, and after them the smiths, next, the carpenters in their turn, and the builders, and so on through all the handicrafts. In response, almost all the allies rose up, but not a man of the Lacedaemonians; for they were forbidden to learn or practice a manual art. Then Agesilaus said with a laugh: 'You see, O men, how many more soldiers than you we are sending out.'"
Plutarch, The Life of Agesilaus, 26

The Spartans (the "Lacedaemonians") divided themselves into three classes:

- Full citizens, known as the Spartiates proper, or Hómoioi ("equals" or peers), who received a grant of land (kláros or klēros, "lot") for their military service.
- Perioeci (the "dwellers nearby"), who were free non-citizens. They were generally merchants, craftsmen and sailors, and served as light infantry and auxiliary on campaigns.
- The third and most numerous class was the Helots, state-owned serfs enslaved to farm the Spartiate klēros. By the 5th century BC, the helots, too, were used as light troops in skirmishes.

The Spartiates were the Spartan army's core: they participated in the Assembly (Apella) and provided the hoplites in the army. Indeed, they were supposed to be soldiers and nothing else, being forbidden to learn and exercise any other trade. To a large degree, in order to keep the vastly more numerous helots subdued, it would require the constant war footing of the Spartan society. One of the major problems of the later Spartan society was the steady decline in its fully enfranchised citizens, which also meant a decline in available military manpower: the number of Spartiates decreased from 6,000 in 640 BC to 1,000 in 330 BC. The Spartans therefore had to use helots as hoplites, and occasionally they freed some of the Laconian helots, the neodamōdeis (the "newly enfranchised"), and gave them land to settle, in exchange for military service.

The Spartiate population was subdivided into age groups. They considered the youngest, those who were 20 years old, as weaker due to their lack of experience. They would only call the oldest, men who were up to 60 years old; or during a crisis, those who were 65 years old, to defend the baggage train in an emergency.

=== Tactical structure ===
The principal source on the Spartan Army's organization is Xenophon, an admirer of the Spartans himself. His Constitution of Sparta offers a detailed overview of the Spartan state and society at the beginning of the 4th century BC. Other authors, notably Thucydides, also provide information, but they are not always as reliable as Xenophon's first-hand accounts.

Little is known of the earlier organization, and much is left open to speculation. The earliest form of social and military organization (during the 7th century BC) seems to have been set in accordance with the three tribes (phylai: the Pamphyloi, Hylleis and Dymanes), who appeared in the Second Messenian War (685–668 BC). A further subdivision was the "fraternity" (phratra), of which 27, or nine per tribe, are recorded. Eventually, this system was replaced by five territorial divisions, the obai ("villages"), which supplied a lochos of about 1,000 men each. This system was still used during the Persian Wars, as Herodotus had made references to the "lochoi" in his Histories.

The changes that occurred between the Persian and the Peloponnesian Wars were not documented. Still, according to Thucydides, at Mantinea in 418 BC, there were seven lochoi present, each subdivided into four pentekostyes of 128 men, which were further subdivided into four enōmotiai of 32 men, giving a total of 3,584 men for the main Spartan army. By the end of the Peloponnesian War, the structure of the army had evolved further, to address the shortages in manpower and create a more flexible system which allowed the Spartans to send smaller detachments on campaigns or garrisons outside their homeland. According to Xenophon, the basic Spartan unit remained the enōmotia, with 36 men in three files of twelve under an enōmotarches. Two enōmotiai formed a pentēkostys of 72 men under a pentēkontēr, and two pentēkostyai were grouped into a lochos of 144 men under a lochagos. Four lochoi formed a mora of 576 men under a polemarchos, the Spartan army's largest single tactical unit. Six morai composed the Spartan army on campaign, to which were added the Skiritai and the contingents of allied states.

==== The kings and the hippeis ====
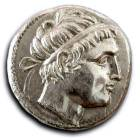
Areus I, a Spartan king during the Chremonidean War, on a coin (310–266 BC)

The two kings would typically lead the full army in battles. Initially, both would go on campaign at the same time, but after the 6th century BC, only one would do so, with the other remaining in Sparta. Unlike other polis, their authority was severely circumscribed; actual power rested with the five elected ephoroi. A select group of 300 men as royal guards, termed hippeis ("cavalrymen"), accompanied the kings. Despite their title, they were infantry hoplites like all Spartiatai. Indeed, the Spartans did not utilize a cavalry of their own until late into the Peloponnesian War. By then, small units of 60 cavalrymen were attached to each mora. The hippeis belonged to the first mora and were the Spartan army's elite, being deployed on the honorary right side of the battle line. They were selected every year by specially commissioned officials, the hippagretai, drafted from experienced men who already had sons as heirs. This was to ensure that their line would be able to continue.

== Training ==
"Ὦ ξεῖν’, ἀγγέλλειν Λακεδαιμονίοις ὅτι τῇδε
κείμεθα, τοῖς κείνων ῥήμασι πειθόμενοι."
"Go tell the Spartans, thou that passest by, that here,
obedient to their laws, we lie."
Simonides of Ceos, Epitaph on the burial mound of the Spartans who fell at Thermopylae

At first, in the archaic period of 700–600 BC, education for both sexes was, as in most Greek states, centred on the arts, with the male citizen population later receiving military education. However, from the 6th century onwards, the military character of the state became more pronounced, and education was totally subordinated to the needs of the military.

A Spartan male's involvement with the army began in infancy when the Gerousia first inspected him. Any baby judged weak or deformed was left at Mount Taygetus to die since the Spartan society was no place for those who could not fend for themselves. (The practice of discarding children at birth took place in Athens as well.) Both boys and girls were brought up by the city women until the age of seven, when boys (paidia) were taken from their mothers and grouped together in "packs" (agelai) and were sent to what is almost equivalent to present-day military boot camp. This military camp was known as the Agoge. They became inured to hardship, being provided with scant food and clothing; this also encouraged them to steal, and if they were caught, they were punished – not for stealing, but for being caught. There is a characteristic story, told by Plutarch: "The boys make such a serious matter of their stealing, that one of them, as the story goes, who was carrying concealed under his cloak a young fox which he had stolen, suffered the animal to tear out his bowels with its teeth and claws, and died rather than have his theft detected." The boys were encouraged to compete against one another in games and mock fights and to foster an esprit de corps. In addition, they were taught to read and write and learned the songs of Tyrtaios, that celebrated Spartan exploits in the Second Messenian War. They learned to read and write not for cultural reasons, but so they could be able to read military maps. At the age of twelve, a boy was classed as a "youth" (meirakion). His physical education was intensified, discipline became much harsher, and the boys were loaded with extra tasks. The youths had to go barefoot, and were dressed only in a tunic both in summer and in winter.

Adulthood was reached at the age of 18, and the young adult (eiren) initially served as a trainer for the boys. At the same time, the most promising youths were included in the Krypteia. If they survived the two years in the countryside they would become full blown soldiers. At 20, Spartans became eligible for military service and joined one of the messes (syssitia), which included 15 men of various ages. Those who were rejected retained a lesser form of citizenship, as only the soldiers were ranked among the homoioi. However, even after that, and even during marriage and until about the age of 30, they would spend most of their day in the barracks with their unit. Military duty lasted until the 60th year, but there are recorded cases of older people participating in campaigns in times of crisis.

Throughout their adult lives, the Spartiates continued to be subject to a training regime so strict that, as Plutarch says, "... they were the only men in the world with whom war brought a respite in the training for war." Bravery was the ultimate virtue for the Spartans: Spartan mothers would give their sons the shield with the words "[Return] With it or [carried] on it!" (Ἢ τὰν ἢ ἐπὶ τᾶς), that is to say, either victorious or dead, since in battle, the heavy hoplite shield would be the first thing a fleeing soldier would be tempted to abandon –- rhipsaspia, "dropping the shield", was a synonym for desertion in the field.

== The army on campaign ==
=== Tactics ===
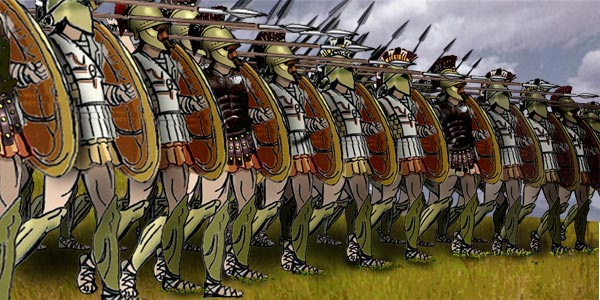
Modern reconstruction of a phalanx advancing in close ranks.

Like the other Greek city-states' armies, the Spartan army was an infantry-based army that fought using the phalanx formation. The Spartans themselves did not introduce any significant changes or tactical innovations in hoplite warfare, but their constant drill and superb discipline made their phalanx much more cohesive and effective. The Spartans employed the phalanx in the classical style in a single line, uniformly deep in files of 8 to 12 men. When fighting alongside their allies, the Spartans would normally occupy the honorary right flank. If, as usually happened, the Spartans achieved victory on their side, they would then wheel left and roll up the enemy formation.

During the Peloponnesian War, battle engagements became more fluid, light troops became increasingly used, and tactics evolved to meet them. However, in direct confrontations between the two opposing phalanxes, stamina and "pushing ability" were what counted. It was only when the Thebans, under Epaminondas, increased the depth of a part of their formation at the Battle of Leuctra that caused the Spartan phalanx formation to break.

=== On the march ===
According to Xenophon, the ephors would first mobilize the army. After a series of religious ceremonies and sacrifices, the army assembled and set out. The army proceeding was led by the king, with the skiritai and cavalry detachments acting as an advance guard and scouting parties. The necessary provisions (barley, cheese, onions and salted meat) were carried along with the army, and a helot manservant accompanied each Spartan. Each mora marched and camped separately, with its baggage train. The army gave sacrifice every morning as well as before battle by the king and the officers; if the omens were not favourable, a pious leader might refuse to march or engage with the enemy.

== Clothing, arms, and armor ==
The Spartans used the same typical hoplite equipment as their other Greek neighbors; the only distinctive Spartan features were the crimson tunic (chitōn) and cloak (himation), as well as long hair, which the Spartans retained to a far later date than most Greeks. To the Spartans, long hair kept its older Archaic meaning as the symbol of a free man; to the other Greeks, by the 5th century, the hairstyle's peculiar association with the Spartans had come to signify pro-Spartan sympathies.

=== Classical period ===
Spartan shields were in the earlier years (7th - 6th centuries BCE) decorated with a personal emblem, as was common in all city states. With the development of the morai, each mora had a unique emblem, carried by all its members. That of Sparta itself was the face of a gorgon; others were the scorpion, rooster, lions' head, eagle and bulls' head. The Spartan king, fighting in the front rank, carried a shield with a sun symbol. The famous 'lambda' was displayed by the end of the Peloponnesian War on the shields of the auxiliary contingents that filled the ranks and made up for the losses. Other city states did the same, Athens distributing shields with an alpha or an owl, or Thebes distributing shields with Hercules' club. Military families passed on their shields to each generation as family heirlooms. The Spartan shields' technical evolution and design evolved from bashing and shield wall tactics. They were of such great importance in the Spartan army that while losing a sword and a spear was an exception, to lose a shield was a sign of disgrace. Not only did a shield protect the user, but it also protected the whole phalanx formation. To come home without the shield was the mark of a deserter; rhipsaspia, or "dropping the shield," was a synonym for desertion in the field. Mothers bidding farewell to their sons would encourage them to come back with their shields, often saying goodbyes such as "Son, either with this or on this" (Ἢ τὰν ἢ ἐπὶ τᾶς). This saying implied that they should return only in victory, a controlled retreat, or dead, with their body carried upon their shield.

Spartan hoplites were often depicted bearing a transverse horsehair crest on their helmet, which was possibly used to identify officers. During the Archaic period, Spartans were armored with flanged bronze cuirasses, leg greaves, and a helmet, often of the Corinthian type. It is often disputed which torso armor the Spartans wore during the Persian Wars. However, it seems likely they either continued to wear bronze cuirasses of a more sculptured type or instead had adopted the linothōrax. During the later 5th century BC, when warfare had become more flexible, and full-scale phalanx confrontations became rarer, the Greeks abandoned most forms of body armor. The Lacedaemonians also adopted a new tunic, the exōmis, which could be arranged to leave the right arm and shoulder uncovered and free for action in combats.

The Spartan's main weapon was the dory spear. For long-range attacks, they carried a javelin. The Spartiates were also always armed with a xiphos as a secondary weapon. Among most Greek warriors, this weapon had an iron blade of about 60 centimeters; however, the Spartan version was typically only 30–45 centimetres in length. The Spartans' shorter weapon proved deadly in the crush caused by colliding phalanxes formations – it was capable of being thrust through gaps in the enemy's shield wall and armor, where there was no room for the longer weapons. The groin and throat were among the favorite targets. According to Plutarch when a Spartan was asked why his sword was so short he replied, "So that we may get close to the enemy." In another, a Spartan complained to his mother that the sword was short, to which she simply told him to step closer to the enemy. As an alternative to the xiphos, some Spartans selected the kopis as their secondary weapon. Unlike the xiphos, which was a thrusting weapon, the kopis was a hacking weapon in the form of a thick, curved iron sword. The Spartans retained the traditional hoplite phalanx until the reforms of Cleomenes III when they were re-equipped with the Macedonian sarissa and trained in the phalanx style.

=== Hellenistic period ===
During the Hellenistic period, Spartan equipment evolved drastically. Since the early 3rd century BC, the pilos helmet had become almost standard within the Spartan army, being in use by the Spartans until the end of the Classical era. Also, after the "Iphicratean reforms," peltasts became a much more common sight on the Greek battlefield, and themselves became more heavily armed. In response to Iphicrates' victory over Sparta in 392 BC, Spartan hoplites started abandoning body armour. Eventually, they wore almost no armour apart from a shield, leg greaves, bracelets, helmet and a robe. Spartans did start to readopt armour in later periods, but on a much lesser scale than during the Archaic period. Finally, during 227 BC, Cleomenes' reforms introduced updated equipment to Sparta, including the Macedonian sarissa (pike). However, pike-men armed with the sarissa never outnumbered troops equipped in the hoplite style. It was also at that time Sparta adopted its own cavalry and archers.

== Education and the Spartan code ==
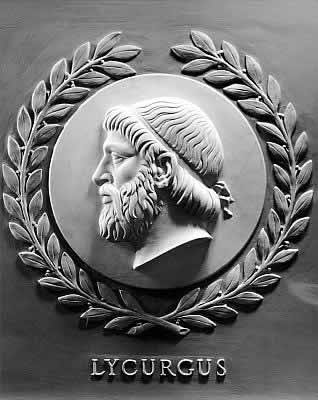
The Spartan philosopher Lycurgus, from a series of marble reliefs depicting the great lawgivers of history, at the chamber of the U.S. House of Representatives

=== Spartan education ===
The Spartan public education system, the agoge, trained the mind as well as the body. Spartans were not only literate but admired for their intellectual culture and poetry. Socrates said the "most ancient and fertile homes of philosophy among the Greeks are Crete and Sparta, where are found more sophists than anywhere on earth." The state provided public education for girls and boys, and consequently, the literacy rate was higher in Sparta than in other Greek city-states. In education, the Spartans gave sports the most emphasis.

The agoge (Ancient Greek: ἀγωγή, romanized: agōgḗ in Attic Greek, or ἀγωγά, agōgá in Doric Greek) was the training program prerequisite for Spartiate (citizen) status. Spartiate-class boys entered it at age seven, and would stop being a student of the agoge at age 21. It was considered violent by the standards of the day, and was sometimes fatal. Those who survived to the final stage (and around the age of 18 to 19) would have the chance to be selected into the Crypteia. Self-discipline, not kadavergehorsam (mindless obedience), was the goal of Spartan education. Sparta placed the values of liberty, equality, and fraternity at the center of their ethical system. These values applied to every full Spartan citizen, immigrant, merchant, and even to the helots, but not the dishonored. Helots are unique in the history of slavery in that, unlike traditional slaves, they were allowed to keep and gain wealth. For example, they could keep half of their agricultural produce and presumably could also accumulate wealth by selling them. There are known to have been occasions that a helot with enough money could purchase their freedom from the state.

=== Spartan code of honor ===
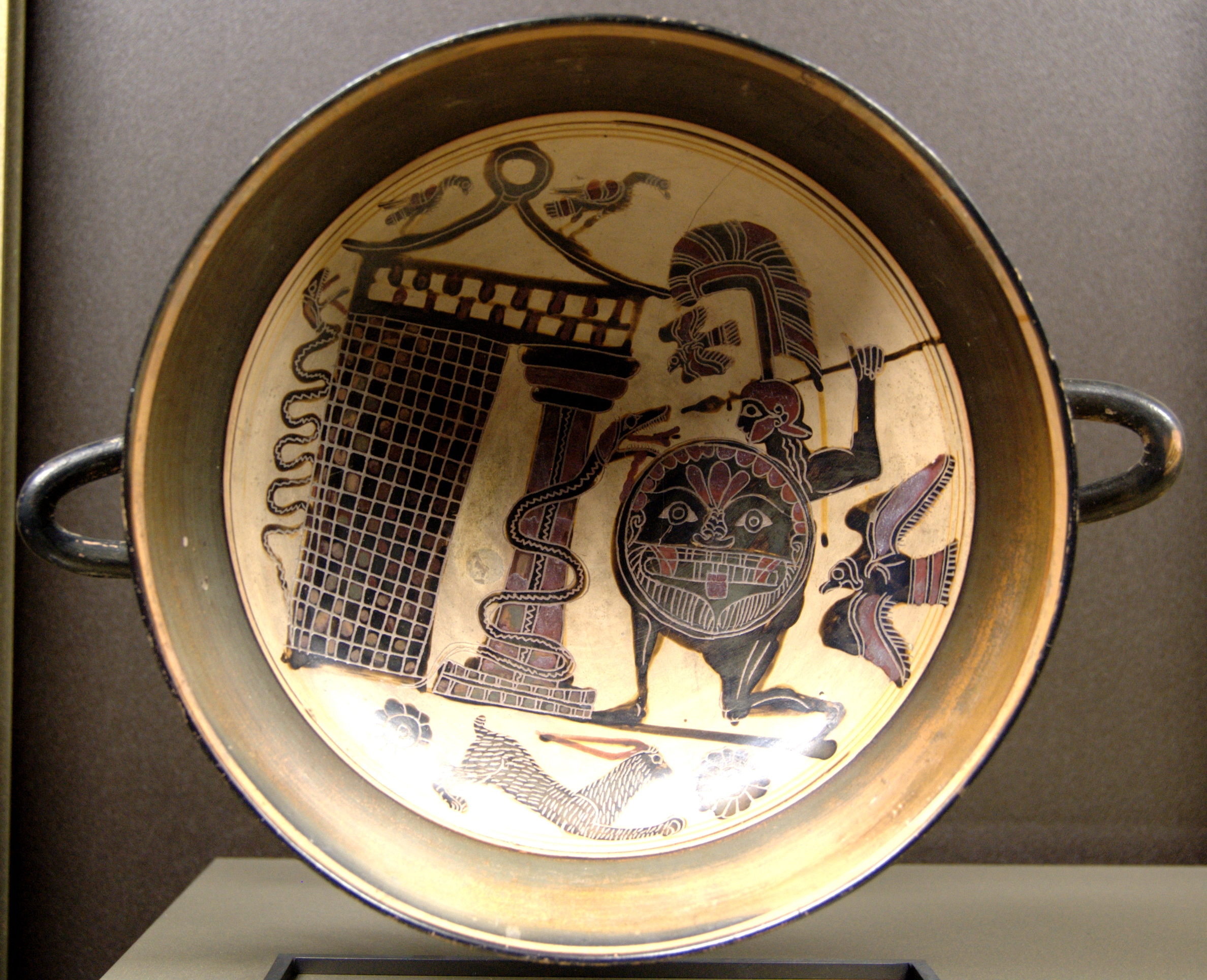
Mythological scene inside a black-figure cup (550–540 BC) by the Spartan artist known as the Rider Painter

The Spartan hoplite followed a strict laconic code of honor. No soldier was considered superior to another. Suicidal recklessness, misbehavior, and rage were prohibited in the Spartan army, as those behaviours endangered the phalanx. Recklessness could also lead to dishonor, as in the case of Aristodemus. Spartans regarded those who fight, while still wishing to live, as more valorous than those who don't care if they die. They believed that a warrior must not fight with raging anger but with calm determination. Spartans must walk without any noise and speak only with few words by the laconic way of life. Other ways for Spartans to be dishonored include dropping the shield (rhipsaspia), failing to complete the training, and deserting in battles. Dishonored Spartans were labelled as outcasts and would be forced to wear different clothing for public humiliation. In battles, the Spartans told stories of valor to inspire the troops and, before a major confrontation, they sang soft songs to calm the nerves.

== Spartan navy ==
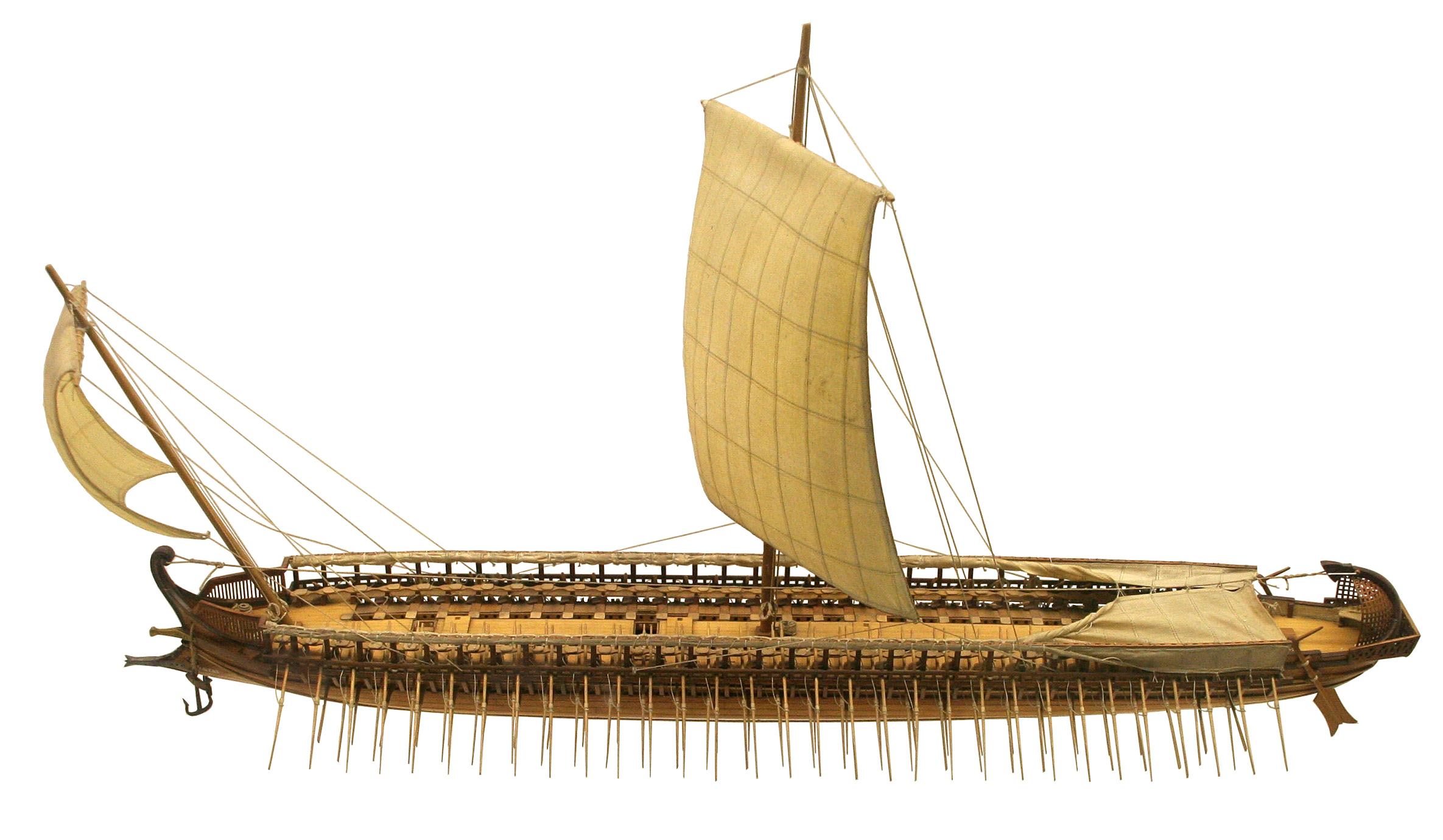
Model of a Greek trireme from the Deutsches Museum, Munich

Throughout their history, the Spartans were a land-based force par excellence. During the Persian Wars, they contributed a small navy of 20 triremes and provided the overall fleet commander. Nevertheless, they largely relied on their allies, primarily the Corinthians, for naval power. This fact meant that, when the Peloponnesian War broke out, the Spartans were supreme on land, but the Athenians excelled at sea. The Spartans repeatedly ravaged Attica, but the Athenians who were kept supplied by sea, were able to stage raids of their own around the Peloponnese with their navy. Eventually, it was the creation of a navy that enabled Sparta to overcome Athens. With Persian gold, Lysander, appointed navarch in 407 BC, was able to master a strong navy and successfully challenged and destroyed Athenian predominance in the Aegean Sea. However, the Spartan engagement with the sea would be short-lived, and did not survive the turmoils of the Corinthian War. In the Battle of Cnidus of 394 BC, the Spartan navy was decisively defeated by a joint Athenian-Persian fleet, marking the end of Sparta's brief naval supremacy. The final blow would be given 20 years later, at the Battle of Naxos in 376 BC. The Spartans periodically maintained a small fleet after that, but its effectiveness was limited. The last revival of the Spartan naval power was under Nabis, who created a fleet to control the Laconian coastline with aid from his Cretan allies.

The fleet was commanded by navarchs, who were appointed for a strictly one-year term, and apparently could not be reappointed. The admirals were subordinated to the vice-admiral, called epistoleus. This position was seemingly independent of the one-year term clause because it was used in 405 BC to give Lysander command of the fleet after he was already an admiral for a couple years.

== Demographic development of the Spartan state and army ==
Modern scholarship reconstructs the demographic history of Sparta from fragmentary literary, archaeological, and comparative evidence. While precise figures remain uncertain, broad trends in the size of the Spartiate citizen body and the armies it could field are widely accepted. These estimates illustrate both Sparta’s rise as a militarized polis and the long-term demographic contraction that undermined its hegemony.

=== Early Archaic Sparta (c. 800–650 BC) ===
In the Early Archaic period, Sparta had not yet completed the institutional and social transformations traditionally associated with the fully militarized Lycurgan system. The Spartiate population was relatively modest but stable, and military forces were assembled on a tribal or ad hoc basis rather than through a rigidly militarized system. Expansion into Laconia and Messenia increased the dependent population, laying the foundations for later militarization.

=== Late Archaic Sparta (c. 650–500 BC) ===
Following the Messenian Wars, Sparta emerged as a highly militarized society. The conquest of Messenia enabled the full development of the helot system, allowing Spartiates to devote themselves to military training. During this period, the Spartiate population likely reached its historical peak, and Sparta began to dominate the Peloponnese through a growing alliance network based on the superior quality of the Spartiates as warriors.

=== Early Classical Sparta (c. 500–479 BC) ===
Early classical Sparta was the height of Spartian citizen manpower. At the time of the Persian Wars, Sparta could draw on the largest Spartiate citizen body attested in the historical record. Herodotus reports 5,000 Spartiate hoplites at the Battle of Plataea (479 BC), accompanied by tens of thousands of non-citizen troops and allies, demonstrating the scale of Sparta’s military system at its zenith.

=== Mid-Classical Sparta (c. 479–404 BC) / Start of Decline ===
Despite its victory in the Peloponnesian War, Sparta’s citizen body declined sharply during the fifth century BC. Losses in prolonged warfare, combined with strict property requirements for citizenship and unequal land distribution, steadily reduced the number of full Spartiates. By the end of the war in 404 BC, Sparta’s military strength increasingly depended on non-citizen troops and allies.

=== Late Classical Sparta (c. 404–371 BC) / Oliganthropia and military decline ===
By the early fourth century BC, Sparta suffered from acute *oliganthropia* (“shortage of men”). Aristotle reports that fewer than 1,000 full citizens remained in his lifetime, a decline that severely constrained Sparta’s ability to field elite hoplite forces. At the Battle of Leuctra (371 BC), the reduced Spartiate contingent was decisively defeated by Thebes, marking the end of Spartan hegemony in Greece.

=== Summary trend (chart interpretation) ===
Taken together, these charts illustrate a "classic demographic boom-and-bust cycle":

- Growth through conquest and militarization (Archaic period)
- Peak citizen manpower around 500–480 BC
- Long contraction driven by exclusivity, inequality, and attrition
- Terminal weakness by the mid-fourth century BC

Modern historians widely agree that this demographic collapse, rather than tactical inferiority alone, explains Sparta’s failure to adapt to the changing military and political landscape of Classical Greece. This was in short, the ability of Athens to outspend them, Thebes to match them in quality of troops, the ability of Philip and Alexander of Macedon to outmatch them with manpower and tactics.

Consolidated demographic timeline of the Spartan state (c. 800–371 BC) Estimated citizen and military manpower (with uncertainty bands)
Period	Date range	Spartiates (citizen core)	Perioikoi	Allied / subject troops	Total field army	Confidence
Early Archaic	800–650 BC	3,000–5,000	2,000–4,000	Minimal	5,000–9,000	Low
Late Archaic	650–500 BC	6,000–9,000	5,000–7,000	Growing Peloponnesian contingents	12,000–18,000	Medium
Early Classical	500–479 BC	8,000–10,000	8,000–10,000	Major Peloponnesian League forces	25,000–35,000	Medium–High
Mid-Classical	479–404 BC	3,000–4,000	8,000–10,000	Extensive but uneven	15,000–25,000	High
Late Classical	404–371 BC	700–1,000	8,000–10,000	Unreliable / hostile	10,000–18,000	High

== Wars and battles ==
=== Messenian Wars ===
Dates	Battle	Allies	Opponents	Outcome
743 BC – 724 BC	First Messenian War	Sparta	Messenia	Spartan Victory
685 BC – 668 BC	Second Messenian War	Sparta	Messenia	Spartan Victory

=== Wars with Argos ===
Dates	Battle	Allies	Opponents	Outcome
669 BC – 668 BC	First Battle of Hysiae	Sparta	Argos	Spartan Defeat
494 BC	Battle of Sepeia	Sparta	Argos	Spartan Victory

=== Persian Wars ===
Dates	Battle	Allies	Opponents	Outcome
480 BC	Battle of Thermopylae	Sparta leading the Hellenic alliance	Achaemenid empire	Spartan Defeat
479 BC	Battle of Plataea	Sparta leading the Hellenic alliance	Achaemenid empire	Spartan Victory

- Artemisium
- Salamis
- Mycale

=== First Peloponnesian War ===
Dates	Battle	Allies	Opponents	Outcome
457 BC	Battle of Tanagra (457 BC)	Sparta	Athenians	Spartan Victory

=== Peloponnesian War ===
- Sybota
- Potidaea
- Chalcis
- Rhium
- Naupactus
- Mytilene
- Olpae
- Pylos
- Sphacteria
- Amphipolis
- First Mantinea
- Sicilian Expedition
- Syme
- Cynossema
- Abydos
- Cyzicus
- Notium
- Arginusae
- Aegospotami

=== Spartan hegemony and Campaigns in Asia ===
Dates	Battle	Allies	Opponents	Outcome
395 BC	Battle of Sardis (395 BC)	Sparta	Achaemenid empire	Spartan Victory

=== Corinthian War ===
Dates	Battle	Allies	Opponents	Outcome
395 BC	Battle of Haliartus	Sparta	Thebes	Spartan Defeat
394 BC	Battle of Nemea	Sparta	Argos; Athens; Corinth; Thebes	Spartan Victory
394 BC	Battle of Cnidus	Sparta	Athens; Achaemenid Empire	Spartan Defeat
394 BC	Battle of Coronea	Sparta; Orchomenus	Argos; Thebes	Spartan Victory
390 BC	Battle of Lechaeum	Sparta	Athens	Spartan Defeat

=== The Boeotian War ===
Dates	Battle	Allies	Opponents	Outcome
376 BC	Battle of Naxos	Sparta	Athens	Spartan Defeat
July 6, 371 BC	Battle of Leuctra	Sparta	Boeotian League (Thebes)	Spartan Defeat
July 4, 362 BC	Second Battle of Mantinea	Sparta; Athens; Elis; Mantineia League	Arcadia; Boeotian League; Thebes	Spartan Defeat

=== The Cleomenean War ===
Dates	Battle	Allies	Opponents	Outcome
227 BC	Battle of Mount Lycaeum	Sparta	Achaean League	Spartan Victory
227 BC	Battle of Ladoceia	Sparta	Achaean League	Spartan Victory
226 BC	Battle of Dyme	Sparta	Achaean League	Spartan Victory
222 BC	Battle of Sellasia	Sparta	Achaean League; Macedon	Spartan Defeat

=== War against Nabis ===
Dates	Battle	Allies	Opponents	Outcome
195 BC	Battle of Gythium	Sparta	Achaean League; Macedon; Pergamon; Rhodes; Rome	Spartan Defeat

== In popular culture ==
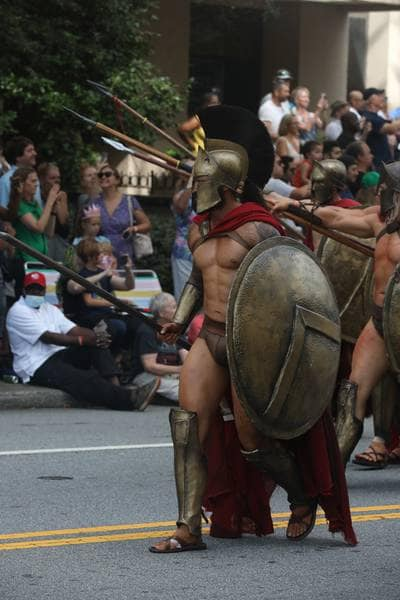
A Spartan cosplay during the DragonCon Parade in Atlanta in 2022

== See also ==
- List of Spartan kings
- Scytale
- Cryptia
- Clearchus of Sparta
- Xanthippus of Carthage
- Homosexuality in the militaries of ancient Greece
- Theban army
- Athenian navy
- Makedonian army

== Sources ==
- Campbell, Duncan B. (2012). Spartan Warrior (Warrior Series #163). Osprey Publications. ISBN 978-1-84908-700-1.
- Connolly, Peter (2006). Greece and Rome at War. Greenhill Books. ISBN 978-1-85367-303-0.
- Lazenby, John (1985). The Spartan Army. Aris & Phillips Ltd. ISBN 0-86516-115-1.
- Sekunda, Nicholas (1986). The Ancient Greeks: Armies of Classical Greece, 5th and 4th Centuries BC (Elite Series #7). Osprey Publications. ISBN 0-85045-686-X.
- Sekunda, Nicholas (1998). The Spartan Army (Elite Series #60). Osprey Publications. ISBN 1-85532-659-0.
- Soriano, Celia (2005). Kayamanan III: History of the World (2005 Ed). Rex Bookstore, Inc. ISBN 971-23-4042-2.
- Warry, John (2004). Warfare in the Classical World. University of Oklahoma Press. ISBN 0-8061-2794-5.
