= Sellasia =

Sellasia Σελλασία
- Community
- Location within Greece
- Coordinates: 37°10′N 22°25′E
- Country: Greece
- Administrative region: Peloponnese
- Regional unit: Laconia
- Municipality: Sparti
- Municipal unit: Oinountas

Population (2021)
  - Community: 390
- Time zone: UTC+2 (EET)
  - Summer (DST): UTC+3 (EEST)
- Vehicle registration: ΑΚ

Sellasia (Greek: Σελλασία, before 1929: Βρουλιά - Vroulia) is a village in Laconia, Greece. It was the seat of the former municipality Oinountas. Since 2011, it is part of the municipality of Sparta. Sellasia is situated on the edge of the Eurotas valley, 10 km north of Sparta. The Greek National Road 39 (Sparta - Tripoli) passes east of the village. Sellasia is known for the cultivation of olives.

== History ==
Sellasia was named after the ancient town Sellasia, which controlled the entrance to Sparta from the north. It was the site of the 222 BC Battle of Sellasia between the Spartans under Cleomenes III and the Macedonian/Achaean coalition under Antigonus III Doson. Afterwards, Sellasia was destroyed and the population was sold as slaves.

== People ==
Sellasia is the birthplace of Pavlos and Thanasis Giannakopoulos, owners of pharmaceutical company Vianex and former owners of Panathinaikos A.O. sports club. It is the ancestral place of origin for both the families of tennis player Pete Sampras and professional wrestler Elias Markopoulos.

== Historical population ==
Year	Population
1981	523
1991	487
2001	524
2011	311
2021	390
