= Alexander (Antigonid general) =

3rd-century BC Antigonid general

- Rank: Commander

Alexander (Gr. Ἀλέξανδρος) was commander of the cavalry in the army of Antigonus III Doson during the war against Cleomenes III of Sparta. He fought alongside Philopoemen, then a young officer in the Achean army, who had to fight a disadvantageous engagement during the Battle of Sellasia to save Alexander's wing (the right wing) of the Macedonian army. This Alexander is probably the same person as the one whom Antigonus, as the guardian of Philip (son of Demetrius II of Macedon), had appointed commander of Philip's body-guard, and who was slandered by Apelles. Subsequently he was sent by Philip as ambassador to Thebes, to persecute the Macedonian Megaleas. Polybius states that at all times he manifested a most extraordinary attachment to his king.
