= Mora (military unit) =

Ancient Spartan military unit

A mora (Greek: μόρα, plural morai) was an ancient Spartan military unit of about a tenth of the Spartan army, at approx. 600 men by modern estimates, although Xenophon places it at 6,000. This can be reconciled by the nature of the Spartan army with an organisation based on year classes, with only the younger troops being mobilised for all but the gravest emergencies. Either way, it was the largest tactical unit in Sparta, if not all Greece, and was often the only force sent out on campaign.

A mora was composed typically of hoplites, men armed with spears, swords and the heavy aspis shield and armoured in a cuirass, greaves and a helmet. This equipment changed over time, with more or less armour being used over different eras. Around 227 BC, Cleomenes III re-equipped some morai with the Macedonian sarissa and trained them to fight in the Macedonian pike phalanx. The unit was led by a Polemarch, the third (or arguably second) highest rank in Spartan hierarchy after the kings. However, sometimes there was a higher rank, that of Strategos, most famously held by Lysander. During the time of pure phalanx combat in Greece, the mora was a very difficult obstacle for an opposing commander to negotiate. However, Iphicrates of Athens used a small, elite group of lightly armed peltasts to destroy one.

== See also ==
- Lochos
