= Sellasia (Laconia) =

Ancient town in Greece

Sellasia (Ancient Greek: Σελλασία), or Selasia (Σελασία), was a town of ancient Laconia, situated in the valley of the Oenus, on the road leading from Tegea and Argos, and one of the bulwarks of Sparta against an invading army. Its distance from Sparta is nowhere mentioned among the ancient writers; but from the description which Polybius gives of the celebrated battle fought in its neighbourhood (the Battle of Sellasia) between Antigonus III Doson and Cleomenes III in 222 BCE, it is probable that the plain now called Krevatá was the site of the battle. We learn from Polybius that this battle took place in a narrow opening of the vale of the Oenus, between two hills named Evas and Olympus, and that the river Gorgylus flowed across the plain into the Evenus.

From its position Sellasia was always exposed to the attacks of an invading army. On the first invasion of Laconia by the Thebans in 369 BCE, Sellasia was plundered and burnt; and because the inhabitants at that time, together with several others of the Perioeci, went over to the enemy, the town was again taken and destroyed four years later by the Lacedaemonians themselves, assisted by some auxiliaries sent by the younger Dionysius. It suffered the same fate a third time after the defeat of Cleomenes III in the Battle of Sellasia. It appears to have been never rebuilt, and was in ruins in the time of Pausanias (2nd century).

The ruins of Sellasia lie 1.5 miles (2.5 km) beyond Palaiogoulas upon the summit of a mountain. The city was about 1 1/2 miles (2.5 km) in circumference, as appears from the foundation of the walls. The latter were from 10 to 11 feet (3.0 to 3.4 m) thick, and consist of irregular but very small stones. The northern and smaller half of the city was separated by a wall from the southern half, which was on lower ground.
