= In Sparta (poem) =

1928 poem by Constantine P. Cavafy

"In Sparta" (Greek: Εν Σπάρτη) is a Greek poem by Constantine P. Cavafy. It was published on 17 April 1928 and can be seen as both a historical and political poem.

== Story ==
This poem follows the story of Cleomenes who was the king of Sparta from 235 BC. He carried out reforms to try to make Sparta a great power in Greece again until his death in 219 BC. But in the process, he had to face the powerful army of Antigonus, King of Macedonia. He was forced to send his mother, Cratesiclea, and his children to Egypt, as hostages, in order to secure the support of Ptolemy III, King of Egypt.

For a long time, Cleomenes was ashamed to tell his mother she would be sent as a hostage; he would always hesitate when he was around her. Cratisiclea suspected her son had something of great importance to say but was too ashamed to tell her. When at last Cleomenes approached her, his mother laughed hysterically at him, thinking he was a coward for hiding it from her for so long. She agreed without a second thought. Throughout the poem Cavafy shows his admiration towards her as well as how influential her role was in this historical period. She plays the role of a strong willed woman who would do anything even give her own life if it led to her nation’s success.

=== Excerpt ===
Original Greek	Transliteration	English Translation
Μα η υπέροχη γυναίκα τον κατάλαβε (είχεν ακούσει κιόλα κάτι διαδόσεις σχετικές), και τον ενθάρρυνε να εξηγηθή. Και γέλασε; κ’είπε βεβαίως πηαίνει! Και μάλιστα χαίρονταν που μπορούσε νάναι στο γήρας της ωφέλιμη στην Σπάρτη ακόμη.	Ma i ypérochi gynaíka ton katálave (eíchen akoúsei kióla káti diadóseis schetikés), kai ton enthárryne na exigithí. Kai gélase: k’ eípe vevaíos piaínei! Kai málista chaírontan pou boroúse nánai sto gíras tis ofélimi stin Spárti akómi.	But the magnificent woman understood him (she’d already heard some rumors about it) and she encouraged him to get it out. And she laughed, saying of course she’d go, happy even that in her old age she could be useful to Sparta still.
