= Cleombrotus II =

King of Sparta

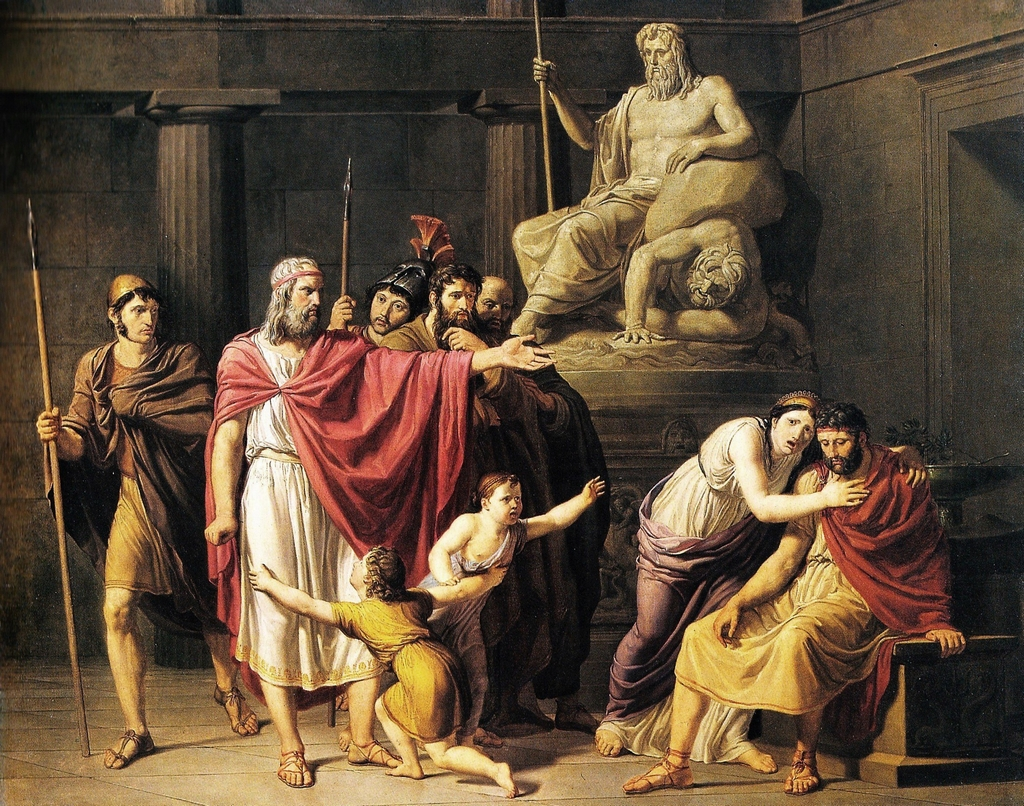
Cleombrotus II ordered into banishment by Leonidas II king of Sparta, Pelagio Palagi (1775–1860).

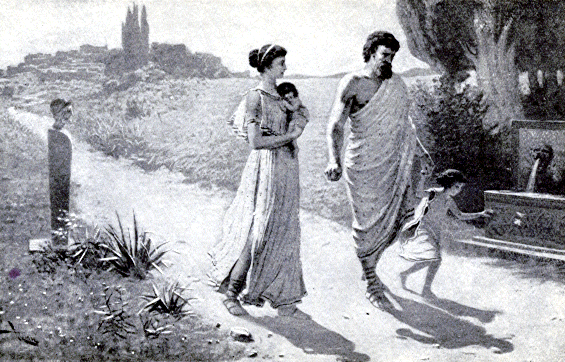
Cleombrotus and Chilonis

Cleombrotus II (Greek: Κλεόμβροτος Β΄) was a Spartan king of the Agiad dynasty. He married into the royal family via the daughter of Leonidas II, Chilonis. Chilonis's mother was a Persian/Seleucid woman, and Cleombrotus II's wife was therefore not fully Spartan. This created friction between Cleombrotus II's father-in-law and then co-regent Agis IV when it came to succession. Cleombrotus II nevertheless succeeded Leonidas II when the latter fled to avoid trial after clashing with co-regent's reforms, and reigned from 242 BC to 241 BC before Leonidas II returned and once more took the throne. He then sent Cleombrotus II and Chilonis into exile. Cleomenes III, Leonidas II's son, eventually succeeded his father at his death.

== Notes ==
Regnal titles
Preceded by Leonidas II	Agiad King of Sparta; 242–241 BC	Succeeded by Leonidas II
