= Chilonis =

Chilonis may refer to:

- Chilonis (daughter of Leotychidas) (3rd century BC) Spartan queen, daughter of Leotychidas, wife of Cleonymus, then Acrotatus, and mother of Areus II
- Chilonis (wife of Cleombrotus II) (3rd century BC) Spartan queen, daughter of the king Leonidas II and wife of Cleombrotus II
