= Megaleas of Macedon =

Megaleas (Ancient Greek: Μεγαλέας) was the royal secretary (basilikos grammateus) to Antigonus III of Macedon, who appointed him, by his will, to the same office under Philip V, his ward and successor (220 BC). Megaleas was entirely under the influence of the advisor Apelles, and readily entered into his treasonable designs (218 BC), to baffle the operations of Philip in his war against the Aetolians. Their treachery, however, was counteracted by Aratus of Sicyon, and the latter accordingly was assailed with personal violence by the royal friends (philoi) Megaleas, Leontius, and Crinon, at Limnaea, in Acarnania, when Philip had returned thither from his successful campaign in Aetolia. For this offence Megaleas and Crinon were thrown into prison 'till they should find security for a fine twenty talents, but Megaleas was released on the bail of Leontius, who had contrived to escape in the tumult for which his accomplices were punished.

In the same year (218) Megaleas and Leontius excited a mutiny at Corinth among the troops of Philip. It was soon quelled; and, though the king knew who had been the authors of it, he dissembled his knowledge, and Megaleas and his chief accomplices were still holding high military rank when Apelles returned to court from Chalcis. The reception, however, of the latter proved that he had quite lost his master's confidence, and Megaleas fled in alarm to Athens; and being refused refugee there, betook himself to Thebes. Here he continued his impotent and rancorous course of treason by writing letters to the Aetolians, filled with abuse of Philip, and with strong exhortations to them to persevere in the war against him, as his finances were exhausted. The letters were intercepted and brought to the king, who thereupon despatched Alexander to Thebes, to sue Megaleas for the amount of his fine; and the traitor, not venturing to abide the issue of the trial, put an end to his own life.
