= Cratesiclea =

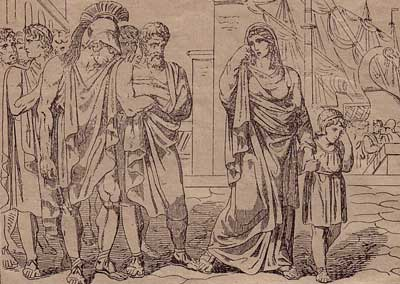
Cratisiclias' departure from Sparta Bartolomeo Pinelli

Cratesiclea (died 219 BC), was a Spartan queen, married to king Leonidas II of Sparta (ancient Greece), and mother of Cleomenes III and Chilonis.

During the reign of her spouse, her foreign origin was used by the opposition of her husband, as Spartan law declared that the queens of Sparta must be Spartan. After the death of her husband, she married the Spartan Megistonos. She was known for her active support of her son Cleomenes III.

During the Cleomenean War, her son asked Ptolemy III for support. The latter, mistrusting the Spartan king because of his revolutionary ideas, accepted to provide help in condition that his children and Cratesiclea go to Alexandria and remain there as hostages. Cratesiclea, feeling that this was a duty towards Sparta, proudly boarded on the Egyptian ship heading to Alexandria (222).

In 222, Cleomenes III joined his mother and sons in Egypt after his deposition. When he failed to secure support with Ptolemy IV of Egypt to retake his throne, he attempted to incite the population of Alexandria to rebel against Ptolemy IV. In retaliation, Ptolemaios IV had both him, his followers as well as his mother and two young sons executed.

Issue

- Cleomenes III
- Chilonis (wife of Cleombrotus II)

== In poetry ==
The Greek poet Constantine Cavafy dedicated two poems to Cratesiclea: "In Sparta" and "Come, O King of the Lacedaimonians".
