= Battle of Dyme =

Spartan victory against the Achaean League, 226 BCE

- Part of Cleomenean War
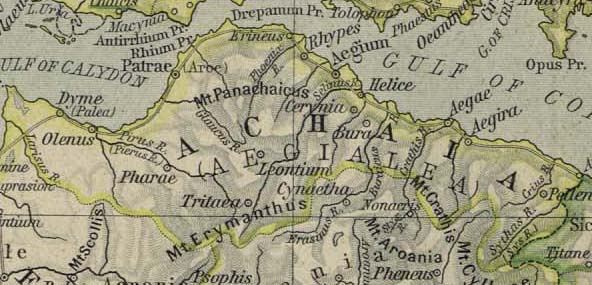
- A map of Achaea showing Dyme on the left.
Date	226 BC
Location	Dyme
Result	Spartan victory

Belligerents
Sparta	Achaean League

Commanders and leaders
Cleomenes III	Hyperbatas, Aratus

Casualties and losses
Low	Heavy

The Battle of Dyme or Dymae was fought by the Achaean League under the command of their Strategos, Hyperbatas, and a Spartan army under the command of King Cleomenes III, and was part of the Cleomenean War. The battle took place near Dyme in north-west Achaea and was fought in 226 BC.

== Prelude ==
Following the declaration of war against Sparta by the Achaean League in around 229-228 BC, the fighting between the two countries had almost been continuous. Cleomenes had crushed two Achaean armies under the command of Aratus of Sicyon at the Battle of Mount Lycaeum and at the Battle of Ladoceia in 227 BC.

After these victories, Cleomenes returned to Sparta and began radical reforms. He abolished the ephors, changed land laws, cancelled debt, and he also changed his army into one of the Macedonian style. Following these reforms, Cleomenes with his reformed army answered to appeals from the city of Mantinea and after ridding it of its Achaean garrison advanced north into the Achaean heartland.

== Battle ==
After advancing into Achaea, Cleomenes descended upon Pharae, a founding member of the League. His aim was to provoke a battle with the Achaeans, or if they didn't come to meet him in battle, to discredit Aratus. The strategos at the time was Hyperbatas, however Aratus had complete control of the League.

As Cleomenes was besieging the city of Dyme, the full Achaean army came out to meet him. When Cleomenes saw them pitch camp, deciding not to battle the enemy while his rear was exposed to attacks from the garrison of Dyme, he advanced on the Achaean position. In the pitched battle that followed, the Spartan phalanx routed the Achaean phalanx with the Achaeans sustaining heavy casualties and with many of the survivors being captured.

== Aftermath ==
This defeat crushed the Achaeans and forced them to sue for peace. Cleomenes offered to give back any cities he seized from the Achaeans and to return any prisoners he had taken in return for being made strategus of the Achaean League. It may be however how Plutarch states that the Achaeans, after seeing his many victories wished for Cleomenes to command them. However, Aratus who was against this proposal sent ambassadors to the court of King Antigonus III Doson where he requested Antigonus' aid against the Spartans which he received in return for giving Acrocorinth to Macedon.

In 224 BC, Antigonus advanced into the Peloponnese with an army of 30,000 men and forced Cleomenes to retreat to Laconia, the Spartan heartland. In 222 BC, the Macedonian-Achaean army and the Spartan army clashed at the Battle of Sellasia which ended in an allied victory. This victory forced Cleomenes to flee from Greece and go to Egypt. Antigonus took Sparta, making him the first foreigner to ever capture Sparta.
