= Chilonis (wife of Cleombrotus II) =

Spartan princess and queen

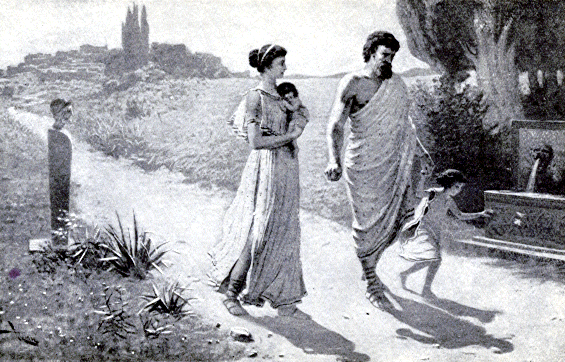
Cleombrotus and Chilonis

Chilonis (Greek: Χιλονίς) was a Spartan princess and queen: daughter, wife, sister and grandmother of four different Spartan kings: Leonidas II, Cleombrotus II, Cleomenes III and Agesipolis III respectively.

== Biography ==
Chilonis, daughter of the king Leonidas II and his wife Cratesiclea, a woman of Persian origin, became Queen of Sparta in 242 BC, when the father was deposed from the throne by the ephor Lysander and substituted by her husband Cleombrotus II. In that circumstance, Chilonis preferred to follow her father in his exile, instead of remaining in Sparta with her husband, the new king.

The next year, when Lysander's duty as ephor had finished, Leonidas returned to Sparta and re-installed himself on the throne, with the intention of sentencing his son-in-law to death, but Chilonis begged her father to commute the penalty to exile and Leonidas satisfied his daughter's wish.

At this point Chilonis, instead of remaining in Sparta, as her father was asking her to, preferred going to exile again, this time following her husband Cleombrotus, along with their two children.
