= Leonidas II =

King of Sparta
- Reign: c. 254 – 242 BC c. 241 – 235 BC
- Predecessor: Areus II, Cleombrotus II
- Successor: Cleombrotus II, Cleomenes III
- Issue: Cleomenes III; Chilonis; Eucleidas

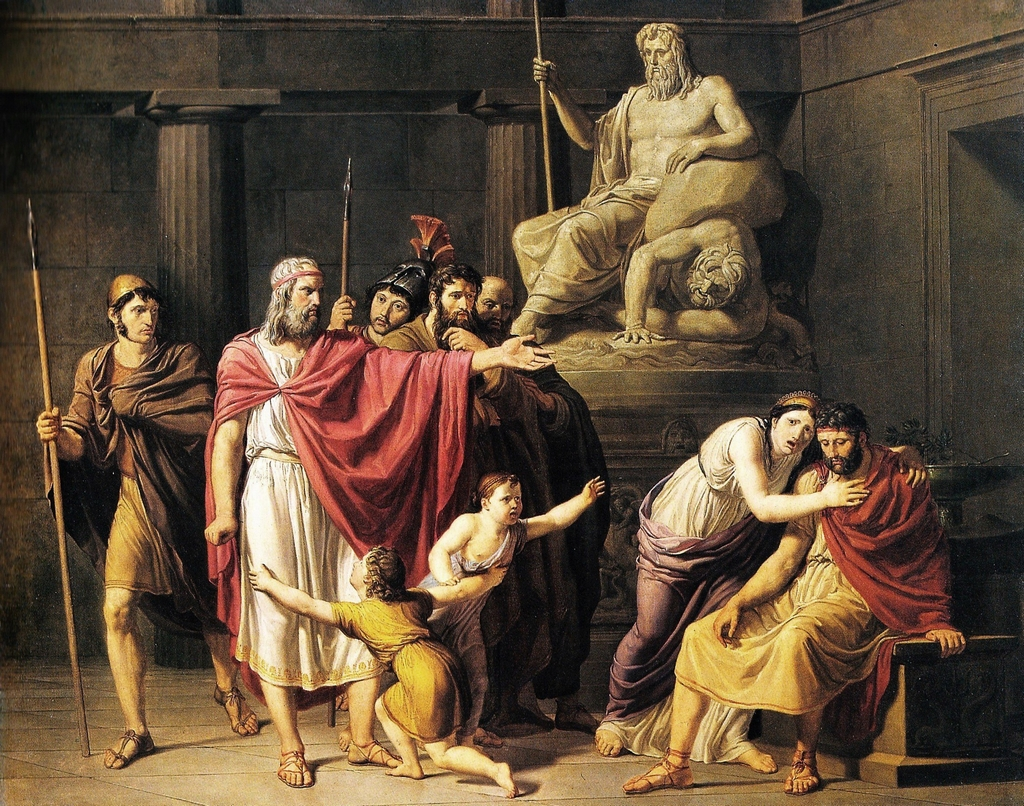
Cleombrotus II ordered into banishment by Leonidas II king of Sparta, Pelagio Palagi (1775–1860).

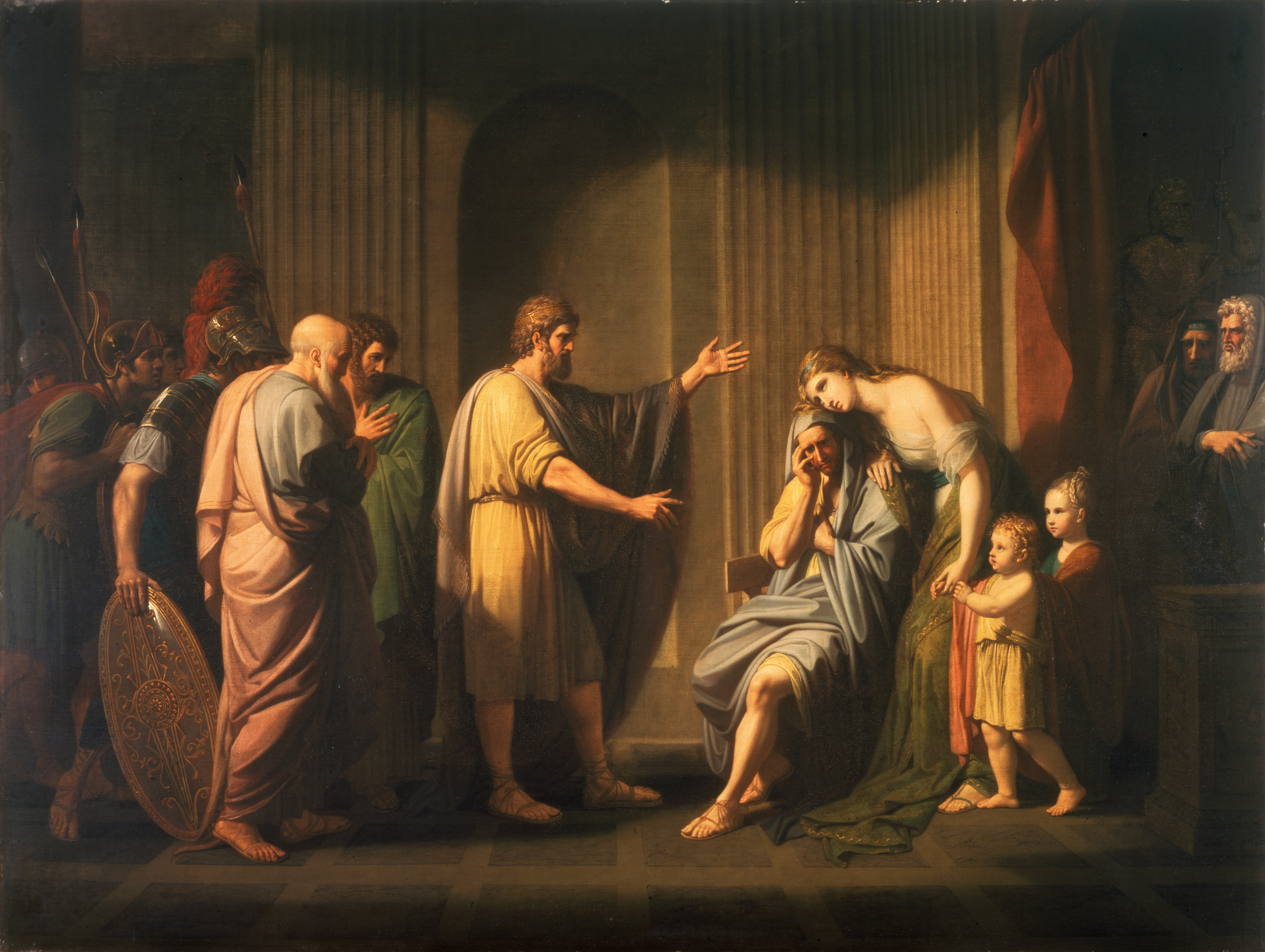
Kleombrotos sent into Exile by Leonidas II, Oil on canvas, Benjamin West, c. 1768.

Leonidas II (/liˈɒnɪdəs, -dæs/; Ancient Greek: Λεωνίδας Β΄, Leōnídas B', "Lion's son, Lion-like") was the 28th Agiad King of Sparta from 254 to 242 BC and from 241 to 235 BC.

== Biography ==
Leonidas was the son of Cleonymus and grandson of King Cleomenes II (r. 370–309) of the Agiad dynasty, one of the two royal families of Sparta (the other being the Eurypontids).

Leonidas II was raised at the Seleucid court, and according to Plutarch's Life of Agis IV, he married a Persian woman. According to other sources, this non-Spartan wife was actually a Seleucid, possibly the daughter of Seleucus I Nicator by his Persian wife Apama. She was therefore not fully Persian, but half-Macedonian and half-Persian. His Persian-influenced lifestyle, his non-Spartan (therefore foreign) wife and his half-Spartan children would all be made issues by the ephor Lysander, the co-king Agis IV, and their supporters.

Leonidas II opposed the attempted reforms of his Eurypontid co-king, Agis IV. The ephor, Lysander, claimed to have seen a sign from the gods against Leonidas, and Leonidas fled to avoid his trial. In his absence, Leonidas was deposed from the throne and replaced by his son-in-law, Cleombrotus II.

He later returned to Sparta while Agis was on campaign in Aetolia, deposed and exiled Cleombrotus II, and reclaimed his throne. Soon after, he deposed and executed Agis IV alongside the latter's mother Agesistrata and grandmother Archidamia.

== Family ==
He was the father of three children by his wife Cratesiclea, who belonged to the Seleucid dynasty founded by Seleucus Nicator.

His son Cleomenes III eventually succeeded him, having been married at age 18 to Agiatis (d. 224 BC), widow of Agis IV, the Eurypontid king; they had at least one son together who died in Egypt with his grandmother. His daughter Chilonis was married to Cleombrotus II who replaced his father-in-law as king for some time. She was notable for her fidelity to her father, whom she followed into exile, and then to her husband whom she also followed into exile after her father returned to power.

== See also ==
- List of Greek monarchs
- List of kings of Sparta

== Bibliography ==
- Paul Cartledge & Antony Spawforth, Hellenistic and Roman Sparta, A tale of two cities, London and New York, Routledge, 2002 (originally published in 1989). ISBN 0-415-26277-1
- Jacqueline Christien, "Léonidas II. La royauté hellénistique à Sparte", Ktèma, 2015, n° 40, pp. 243–253.

Regnal titles
Preceded by Areus II	Agiad King of Sparta; 254–242 BC	Succeeded by Cleombrotus II
Preceded by Cleombrotus II	Agiad King of Sparta; 241–235 BC	Succeeded by Cleomenes III
