= Battle of Sellasia =

222 BCE battle between a Macedonian-Achaean alliance and Sparta

- Part of the Cleomenean War
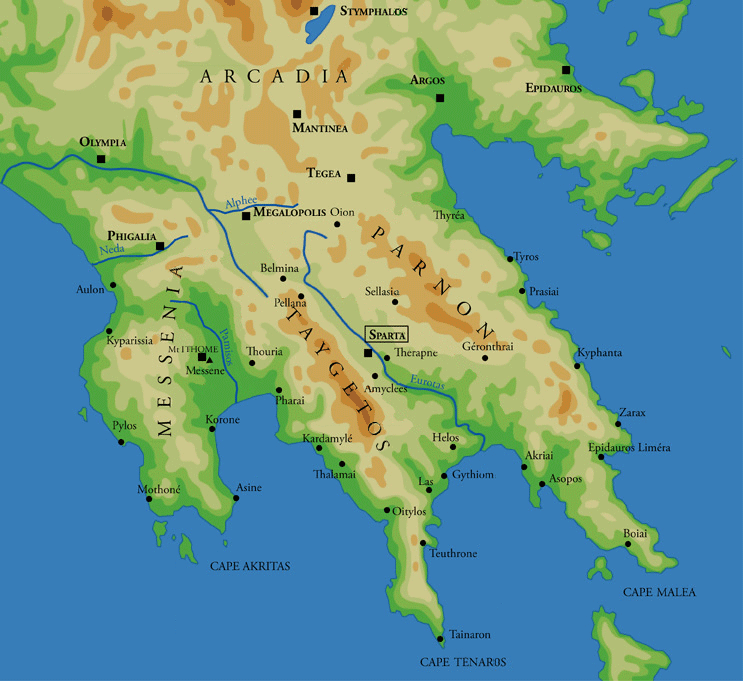
- A map of depicting the South Peloponnese.
Date	222 BC
Location	Sellasia, Laconia
Result	Decisive Macedonian-Achaean victory

Belligerents
League of Leagues: Macedon; Achaean League; Boeotian League; Acarnania; Epirus; Ardiaei	Sparta

Commanders and leaders
Antigonus III Doson; Philopoemen; Cercidas; Alexander; Demetrius of Pharos	Cleomenes III; Eucleidas †

Strength
28,000 infantry, 1,200 cavalry	20,000 infantry, 650 cavalry

Casualties and losses
Substantial	Heavy; 5,800 Spartans dead

The Battle of Sellasia took place during the summer of 222 BC between Macedon and the Achaean League, led by Antigonus III Doson, and Sparta under the command of King Cleomenes III. The battle was fought at Sellasia, on the northern frontier of Laconia and ended in a Macedonian-Achaean victory.

In 229 BC, Cleomenes initiated hostilities against the Achaean League, the dominant power of the Peloponnese. In a series of campaigns, Cleomenes was successful in defeating the Achaeans, making Sparta the main regional power. This prompted the chief figure of the Achaean League, Aratus of Sicyon, to approach the King of Macedon, Antigonus III Doson, for military assistance. The Macedonians acquiesced on the terms that the Achaean surrender the formidable fortress of Acrocorinth to them. The Macedonians invaded the Peloponnese in 224 BC at the head of a Greek alliance and by 222 BC managed to hem Cleomenes in Laconia.

In the summer of 222 BC, the Macedonian and Achaean army advanced to Sellasia on the northern border of Laconia, where they encountered the awaiting army of Cleomenes. After a brief impasse, Antigonus launched an offensive against the Spartan positions on the fortified mountains of Olympus and Evas. While the Macedonian right flank routed the Spartan left wing on Evas, the battle on the other flank was heavily contested. After initially pushing back the Macedonian phalanx, the Spartans were driven from the field by the superior numbers of the Macedonians. Cleomenes was compelled to leave for exile in Alexandria and Antigonus became the first non-Spartan general to occupy Sparta.

== Background ==
The seizure of numerous important Arcadian cities by the King of Sparta, Cleomenes III, prompted the dominant state of the Peloponnese, the Achaean League, to declare war on Sparta. The Achaean attempts to recaptured these cities, led by the strategos, Aratus of Sicyon, largely failed as Sparta consolidated its position. Subsequent Achaean offensives in 226 BC were crushingly defeated at the Battle of Mount Lycaeum and the Battle of Ladoceia.

The Achaean position was additionally weakened when their erstwhile ally, Ptolemy III of Egypt, shifted his financial backing to Sparta. Ptolemy had been subsidising the campaign of the Achaeans against Macedon and now determined that Sparta would be a more effective ally to offset Macedonian power. This was compounded by the resounding Spartan victory over the Achaean army at the Battle of Dyme, leading the League to seek peace with Cleomenes.

When the peace talks failed, Aratus sent envoys to the Macedonian King, Antigonus III Doson, seeking military assistance. Antigonus pledged to give aid on the term that the formidable citadel, Acrocorinth was ceded to Macedon. This conditions elicited a furious response from many Achaeans and Cleomenes used this to his advantage by occupying the major cities of Corinth and Argos and many smaller settlements. Aratus accepted the terms proposed by the Macedonians and additionally surrendered the cities of Orchomenus and Heraia to Macedon. Subsequently, Antigonus mustered his army for the invasion of the Peloponnese.

== Prelude ==
Antigonus marched towards the Peloponnese with a large army of 20,000 infantry and 1,300 cavalry via the island of Euboea. They resorted to this after having their passage blocked by the hostile Aetolian League, who threatened to block their march if they went further south. After reaching the Isthmus of Corinth, the Macedonian army found their march halted by a series of fortifications that Cleomenes had erected across the Isthmus. Several attempts to breach the fortifications were repulsed with considerable losses.

Argos, however, revolted against Sparta and expelled their garrison with the help of some Macedonian soldiers. This defeat forced Cleomenes to abandon his position on the Isthmus and to retreat back to Arcadia. Meanwhile, Antigonus revived the Hellenic League of Philip II of Macedon under the name of the "League of Leagues" and managed to incorporate most of the Greek city-states in this League.

Antigonus proceeded to capture several cities in Arcadia that had sided with Cleomenes. He returned to Achaea before dismissing his Macedonian troops so that they could winter at home. Around this time, Ptolemy of Egypt stopped paying subsidies to Cleomenes, which left Cleomenes without money with which to pay for his mercenaries. In order to obtain money, Cleomenes began to sell helots their freedom in exchange for a sum of money.

Cleomenes became aware of the fact that Antigonus had dismissed all of his Macedonian troops and decided to launch a raid on the Achaean League. He gave the impression that he was going to raid the territory of Argos but instead switched directions and attacked Megalopolis. The Spartans managed to overrun a weak section of the fortifications and began to take over the city. The citizens of Megalopolis were not aware that the Spartans were in the city until dawn after which a rearguard action by some of the citizens allowed most of the Megalopolitans to escape. Cleomenes sent the Megalopolitans a message offering back their city if they joined his alliance but when this offer was refused, Cleomenes ordered that the city be sacked and razed.

The sack of Megalopolis came as a big shock for the Achaean League. Cleomenes followed this success up by raiding the territory of Argos, as he knew Antigonus could not resist him due to a lack of men. Cleomenes had also hoped that a raid on Argive territory would make the Argives lose faith in Antigonus because of his failure to protect their land. Walbank assess this raid as being "an impressive demonstration, but it had no effect other than to make it even more clear that Cleomenes had to be defeated in a pitched battle."

== Battle ==
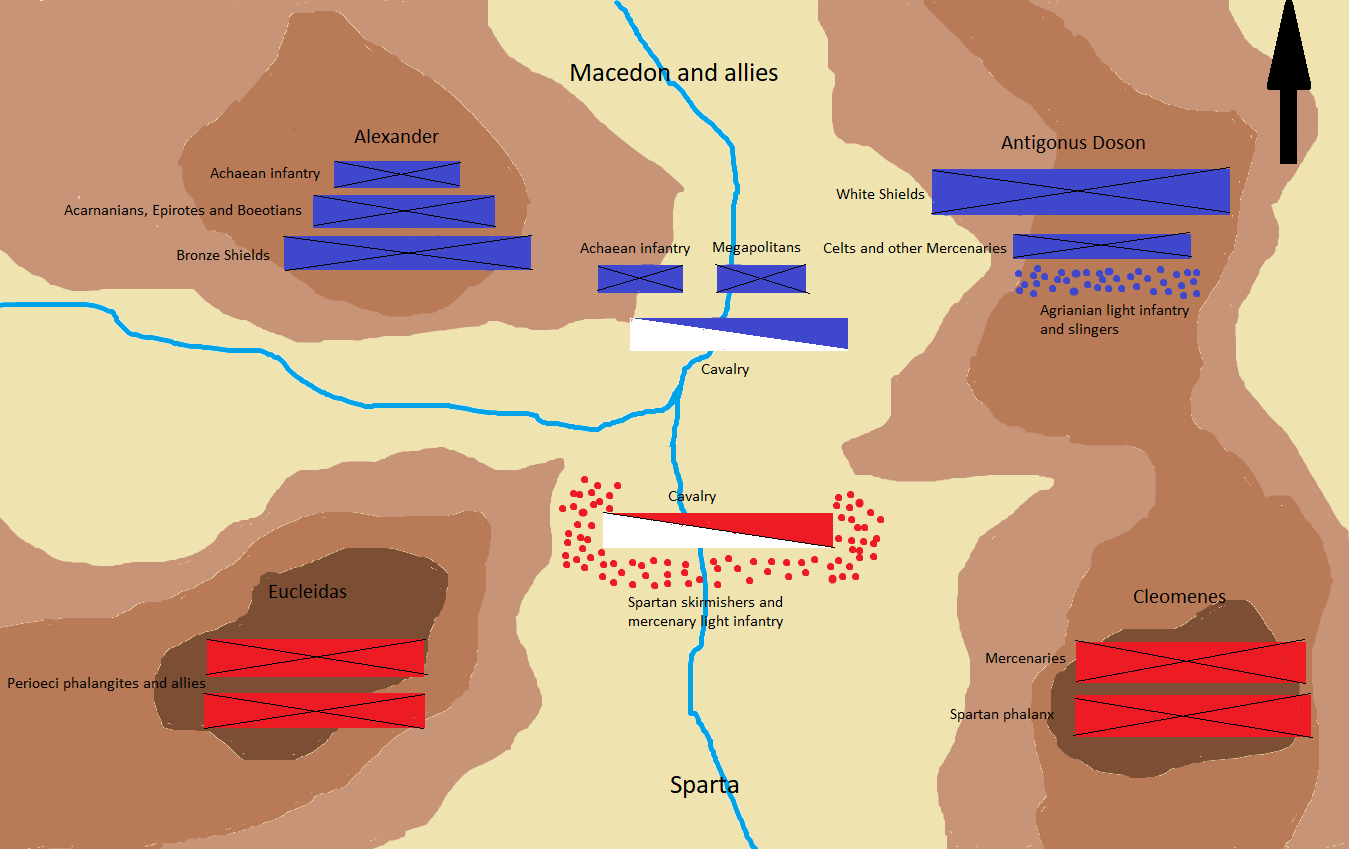
The initial positions of the Battle of Sellasia

=== Opposing armies ===
Antigonus responded to this raid by recalling his army from Macedon. The Macedonian levy marching on Laconia was augmented by the contingents from allies, who had mustered in the Peloponnese. Polybius describes the amassed army as consisting of 29,200 men. The Macedonian contribution to this force was 10,000 phalangists, 3,000 peltasts, and 300 cavalry, a figure supplemented by the addition of 1,000 Agrianians, 1,600 Illyrians commanded by Demetrius of Pharos, and 1,000 Galatians, as well as 3,000 other mercenary infantry and 300 cavalry. The size of army was greatly increased by the contingents of the Greek allies. The Achaeans supplied 3,000 infantry and 300 cavalry, the Arcadians 1,000 infantry from Megalopolis commanded by Cercidas, the Boeotians 2,000 infantry and 200 cavalry, the Acarnanians 1,000 infantry and 50 cavalry, and the Epirotes 1,000 infantry and 50 cavalry.

To counter the Macedonian invasion, Cleomenes moved to raise the largest force that he was able. He was able to muster an army of 20,650 men. This consisted of the Spartan levy of hoplites, possibly 2,000 Lacedaimonians armed in the fashion of Macedonian phalangists, contingents of perioeci, and mercenaries with 650 cavalry. Cleomenes managed to fortify the passes leading into Laconia with a series of barricades and trenches before moving with his army to assume a position at the pass at Sellasia on the northern frontier of Laconia.

=== Battle ===
When Antigonus and his army arrived at Sellasia, they found the Spartan army occupying strong positions on the hills, Olympus and Euas, with the Oenous River running between them. Eucleidas with the perioeci and the allies were stationed on Euas, while Cleomenes held Olympus with the Spartans and mercenaries. On the flat ground between the hills, Cleomenes deployed his cavalry and the remainder of his mercenaries. The strength of the Spartan deployment prompted the Macedonians to not launch an immediate assault against the Lacedaemonians.

Antigonus placed his phalanxes facing the Lacedaemonian infantry which was arrayed at the top of the two hills, with the order to advance and take the heights. His cavalry of Macedonians, Achaeans, Boeotians, and mercenaries under the command of Alexander, were arrayed in front of the enemy cavalry in the centre. The allied right wing advanced against the Lacedaemonians on Euas, but was attacked in the flank by enemy infantry that was initially arrayed with the cavalry. Without cover from their heavy infantry, the advancing allies were hard pressed by the Spartans from the rear and the front, until the Arcadian cavalryman Philopoemen, disregarding the orders, charged with the men who would follow. This timely initiative saved the light infantry on Euas from annihilation and paved the way to victory, as the Illyrians and other light infantry soon drove the Spartans from the hill and killed Eucleidas. After the battle, Antigonus praised Philopoemen's initiative and reproved his own commander Alexander.

The battle on Olympus between the two phalanxes lasted longer, but when the allied reinforcements from Euas took the enemy in the flank, the Spartans fought almost to the last man, until their king fled the field with a handful of companions. According to Plutarch, out of 6,000 Spartiates, only 200 survived, the others preferring honourable death to disgrace. Accompanied by his closest friends, Cleomenes took a ship in Gythium to reach his mother and sons in Alexandria where he stayed in exile until his death three years later.
