= Eucleidas =

King of Sparta from 227 to 222

Eucleidas (Ancient Greek: Εὐκλείδας) reigned Sparta from 227 BC to 222 BC. He was an Agiad, son of Leonidas II, in the place of the Eurypontid king.

His brother, Cleomenes III, deposed his Eurypontid colleague Archidamus V, and installed his brother as his new co-ruler.

According to Pausanias, Cleomenes poisoned Eudamidas III, his Eurypontid colleague, and shared the royal power with his brother Eucleidas.

Eucleidas was killed fighting against the Macedonians at the Battle of Sellasia (222 BC).

== Footnotes ==
Preceded by Archidamus V	Usurper Eurypontid King of Sparta; 228–222 BC	Succeeded by Republic
