= Battle of Mount Lycaeum =

Battle in ancient Greece

Coordinates: 37°27′25″N 21°58′30″E

- Part of the Cleomenean War
- A map of depicting the location of the Battle of Mount Lycaeum.
Date	227 BC
Location	Mount Lycaeum, border of Elis and Arcadia
Result	Spartan victory

Belligerents
Sparta	Achaean League

Commanders and leaders
Cleomenes III	Aratus of Sicyon

Casualties and losses
Light	Heavy

The Battle of Mount Lycaeum (or Lykion) was fought between Sparta led by Cleomenes III and the Achaean League commanded by Aratus. It was the first major battle of the Cleomenean War. The battle occurred at Mount Lycaeum on the border of Elis and Arcadia and ended in a Spartan victory.

== Prelude ==
In 229 BC, Cleomenes III, King of Sparta, initiated a campaign with the aim of extending the regional power of his kingdom. This was opposed by the major power in the Peloponnese, the Achaean League. In an attempt to curtail the resurgent power of Sparta, the Achaeans led by their strategos, Aratus, unsuccessfully attempted to re-capture the cities of Tegea and Orchomenus. This failure was made worse when a vastly numerically superior Achaean army commanded by Aristomachos of Argos declined to offer battle to the army of Cleomenes.

Though these failures were offset to some extent by the occupation of Caphyae, a city that had previously been taken over by Cleomenes, the Spartan ascendancy in the war was becoming apparent. Ptolemy III of Egypt, who had been supporting the Achaean campaign against Macedon, shifted his financial backing from the Achaean League to Sparta. Ptolemy based this on the assumption that Sparta would be a more useful ally in counterbalancing Macedon.

== Battle ==
Aratus was re-elected strategos in 227 BC and then launched an invasion of Elis, a Spartan ally. The Elians, unable to defeat the Achaeans, asked Sparta for assistance. The Spartan response was to dispatch Cleomenes with an army to aid their allies. As the Achaeans were returning from Elis, Cleomenes launched an attack on the Achaeans near Mount Lycaeum, on the border of Elis and Arcadia. The Achaeans, who were unprepared for battle, fled in disarray from the combat. The Spartans scored a comprehensive victory, routing the opposing army. They managed to capture a great part of the Achaean army as well as inflicting massive casualties. The victory was so complete that it was initially thought that Aratus had been slain in the midst of battle.

== Aftermath ==
Aratus was able to use the confusion in the aftermath of the battle to his advantage. He seized the city of Mantinea from the Spartans and secured it. This success was short-lived as the Achaeans were decisively defeated by Cleomenes at the Battle of Ladoceia later in 227 BC and again at the Battle of Dyme in 226 BC. These victories established Spartan dominance over the Peloponnese.
