= Antigonus III Doson =

King of Macedon from 229 to 221 BC

Antigonus III
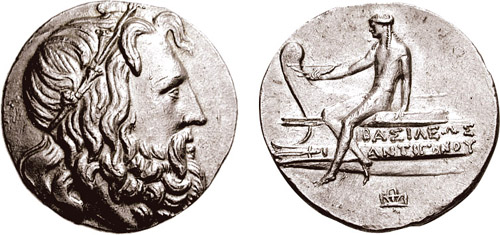
- Silver tetradrachm struck sometime during the reign of Antigonus. Obv.: head of Poseidon wearing wreath of marine plants; rev.: Apollo seated on the prow of a ship.

King of Macedon
- Reign: 229 – 221 BC
- Predecessor: Demetrius II Aetolicus
- Successor: Philip V
- Born: 263 BC
- Died: 221 BC
- Dynasty: Antigonid dynasty
- Father: Demetrius the Fair
- Mother: Olympias

Antigonus III Doson (Ancient Greek: Ἀντίγονος Δώσων, 263–221 BC) was king of Antigonid Macedon from 229 BC to 221 BC. Antigonus was a member of the Antigonid dynasty through his paternal line. During the Cleomenean War, Antigonus revived the Hellenic League of Philip II of Macedon under the name of the "League of Leagues" and managed to incorporate most of the Greek city-states in this League.

== Family background ==
Antigonus III Doson was a half-cousin of his predecessor, Demetrius II Aetolicus. Doson's father was Demetrius the Fair (briefly king of Cyrene), the son of Demetrius Poliorcetes and his third wife, Ptolemaïs, daughter of Ptolemy I Soter and Eurydice, daughter of Antipater. As such, Demetrius the Fair was, on his father's side, a younger half-brother of Demetrius II's father, Antigonus II Gonatas, the son of Poliorcetes by his first wife, Phila, another of Antipater's daughters; as well as a nephew of both Ptolemy Keraunos and Meleager on his mother's side. According to Eusebius, Doson's own mother was a Thessalian noblewoman, Olympias, daughter of Pauliclitus of Larissa. Antigonus also had a brother named Echecrates, whose son, named Antigonus after Doson himself, was put to death by Perseus on the latter's accession to the throne of Macedon.

Doson's father, Demetrius the Fair, died sometime around 250 BC, as a result of events that occurred after being summoned from Macedonia to Cyrene to marry Berenice II, the daughter and heir of Magas of Cyrene. Rather than contenting himself with his young bride, Demetrius openly became the lover of her powerful mother, Apama II. So the jealous bride took her revenge by having him assassinated. It is unclear whether Doson's mother had died before this time.

Antigonus' by-name, Doson, is Greek for "going to give." The meaning of this is uncertain. According to Plutarch it "implied that he was given to promising but did not perform his engagements", though even the exact meaning of this is unclear.

== Regent of Macedonia ==
When Demetrius II died in battle in 229 BC, his son and would-be successor, the later Philip V, was only nine years old. According to Plutarch, both the Macedonian army and nobility thought the political situation too volatile to wait for Philip V to mature enough to assume command. As a consequence, the Macedonian nobility turned to Doson, who was subsequently made regent of the kingdom and then married his predecessor's widow and the mother of Philip, Chryseis. However, it was only after Doson demonstrated his leadership abilities by succeeding (where his cousin Demetrius had failed) in defeating the Dardanii invaders and also in putting down a rebellion by the Thessalians, and showing his rule to be generally moderate and good, that he was given the title of king. Unlike his Antigonid ancestors, he had no viable rivals to challenge his right to rule. Yet, even as king he apparently envisioned himself as caretaker for his cousin's son, Philip V.

== King of Macedonia ==
As king, Antigonus III proved to be as much a master of tactical diplomacy as of military strategy. In less than a decade of rule he not only secured the borders of his kingdom, but he also re-established Macedon as the dominant power in the region. Unlike previous Macedonian rulers who attempted direct dominion over their fiercely independent neighbours to the West and South, he formed alliances with Epirus and the Achaean League. When Sparta, under Cleomenes III, attempted to establish hegemony over the whole Peloponnese, Aratus of Sicyon - longtime leader of Greek opposition to Macedonian domination - invited Antigonus to intervene (226 BC). Establishing his base on the heights above Corinth, Antigonus reconstituted a broad-based Hellenic league (probably 224 BC) under his leadership before launching his attack on Sparta. The Spartan forces, outmatched by the larger, better equipped Macedonian army, were so overwhelmed in the Battle of Sellasia (222 BC) that Cleomenes only managed to escape with a few horsemen, and ultimately had to seek refuge in Egypt. However, in a magnanimous gesture, Antigonus restrained his soldiers from plundering Sparta, saying it was Cleomenes, not Sparta, that was his enemy.

Antigonus did not long survive this victory. For, while his forces were campaigning in the southern Peloponnese, Illyrians invaded Macedonia from the north. Antigonus had to rush north to repel this new threat. On his way, Antigonus passed through Tegea and Argos, his arrival at the latter coinciding with the beginning of the Nemean Games, where he was honoured by the Achaean League and various other cities. His death occurred soon after, when he returned to Macedon and engaged the Illyrian army; for though Macedonian forces were once again victorious, the commander became sick during the battle (possibly, though not necessarily, as a result of a ruptured blood vessel) and died.

== Bibliography ==
- Scherberich, Klaus (2009). Koinè symmachía. Untersuchungen zum Hellenenbund Antigonos' III. Doson und Philipps V. (224–197 v. Chr.) [Koinè symmachía. Studies on the Hellenic League of Antigonus III Doson and Philip V (224–197 BC)]. Historia Einzelschriften. Vol. 184. Stuttgart: Steiner. ISBN 978-3-515-09406-1.

Antigonus III Antigonid dynasty Born: 263 Died: 221 BC
Royal titles
Preceded by Demetrius II	King of Macedon; 229–221 BC	Succeeded by Philip V
