= Cleomenes III =

3rd-century BCE king of Sparta, Agiad dynasty

- King of Sparta
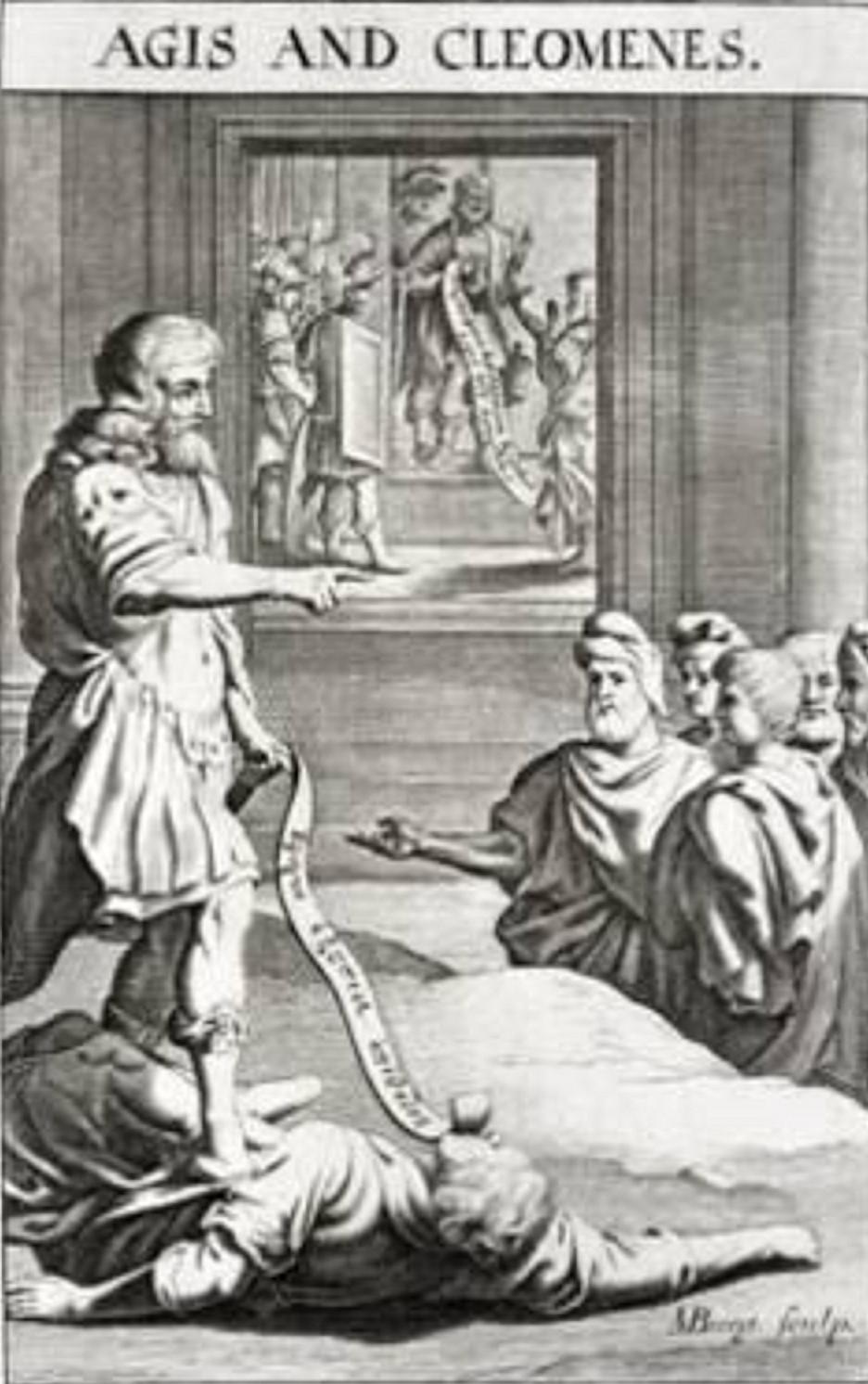
- Kings Agis and Cleomenes, late 17th century engraving.
- Reign: 235–222 BC
- Predecessor: Leonidas II
- Successor: Agesipolis III
- Born: c. 265–260 BC; Sparta
- Died: 219 BC; Alexandria
- Consort: Agiatis
- Issue: Unknown (at least one son)
- Dynasty: Agiad
- Father: Leonidas II
- Mother: Cratesiclea

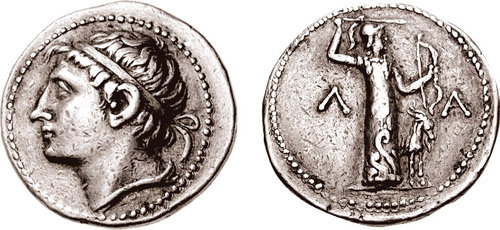
Silver tetradrachm depicting Kleomenes III. Reverse: statue of Artemis Ortheia brandishing a spear and holding a bow, ΛΑ(ΚΩΝΩΝ), of Laconia.

Cleomenes III (Ancient Greek: Κλεομένης) was one of the two kings of Sparta from 235 to 222 BC. He was a member of the Agiad dynasty and succeeded his father, Leonidas II. He is known for his attempts to reform the Spartan state.

From 229 to 222 BC, Cleomenes waged war against the Achaean League under Aratus of Sicyon. After being defeated by the Macedonians in the Battle of Sellasia in 222 BC, he fled to Ptolemaic Egypt. After a failed revolt in 219 BC, he committed suicide.

== Early life ==
Cleomenes was born in Sparta to the future Agiad king Leonidas II and his wife Cratesicleia. The exact year of Cleomenes' birth is unknown but historian Peter Green puts it between 265 BC and 260 BC.

Around 242 BC, Leonidas was exiled from Sparta and forced to seek refuge in the temple of Athena after opposing the reforms of the Eurypontid King, Agis IV. Cleomenes' brother-in-law, Cleombrotus, who was a supporter of Agis, became king. Meanwhile, having started his reforms Agis went on a campaign near the Isthmus of Corinth, which presented Leonidas with an opportunity to regain his throne. He quickly disposed of Cleombrotus, and went after Agis who had gone to find sanctuary. After holding out for quite some time, Agis was arrested and executed, along with other family members.

Following the execution of Agis, Cleomenes, who was around eighteen at the time, was forced by his father to marry Agis' widow, Agiatis, who was a wealthy heiress. According to legend, Cleomenes was hunting when his father sent him a message telling him to return immediately to Sparta. When he returned to the city, he saw that it was being decorated for a wedding and when he asked his father who was getting married, his father replied that he, Cleomenes, was. It was reported that Cleomenes was doubtful about the marriage because his father had had Agiatis' husband executed. Nevertheless, the marriage went ahead.

== Early years ==
Cleomenes ascended the throne of Sparta in 235 BC, following the death of his father. Cleomenes had been inspired by Agis as told to him by his lover Xenares and followed through on his reforms. Meanwhile, the Achaean League under the command of Aratus of Sicyon was trying to unite all of the Peloponnese. Upon hearing of Leonidas' death, Aratus began attacking the cities of Arcadia, which bordered Achaea. Plutarch says that Aratus made these moves to discover Sparta's inclinations.

In 229 BC, the cities of Tegea, Mantinea, Caphyae and Orchomenus, who were allied with the Aetolian League, joined Sparta. Historians Polybius and Sir William Smith claim that Cleomenes seized these cities by treachery; however the translator of Plutarch on Sparta, Richard Talbert, claims he did so at their own request. Later that year, the ephors sent Cleomenes to seize Athenaeum, a fort on the Spartan border with Megalopolis which was being disputed by both cities. Cleomenes seized the fort and improved its fortifications. Meanwhile, the Achaean League summoned a meeting of its assembly and declared war against Sparta. In retaliation for fortifying Athenaeum, Aratus carried out a night attack on Tegea and Orchomenus but when his supporters inside those cities failed to help, he retreated, hoping to remain undetected.

Cleomenes discovered the attempted night attack and sent a message to Aratus asking the purpose of the expedition. Aratus replied that he had come to stop Cleomenes from fortifying Athenaeum. Cleomenes response was, "if it's all the same to you, write and tell me why you brought along those torches and ladders."

== Cleomenean War ==
"Upon this, Cleomenes wrote to him, in a familiar way, desiring to know, "Whether he marched the night before." Aratus answered, "That, understanding his design to fortify Belbina, the intent of his last motion was to prevent that measure." Cleomenes humorously replied, "I am satisfied with the account of your march; but should be glad to know where those torches and ladders were marching."
The conversation between Cleomenes and Aratus according to Plutarch.

Cleomenes advanced into Arcadia before being called back by the ephors. When Aratus captured Caphyae, the ephors sent him out again. He ravaged the territory of Argos with an army of 5,000 men before being confronted by the new strategos of the Achaean League, Aristomachos of Argos and his army consisting of 20,000 infantry and 1,000 cavalry at Pallantium. Aratus, who accompanied Aristomachos as an adviser, urged him to retreat. Smith agrees with Aratus' assessment that 20,000 Achaeans were no match for 5,000 Spartans.

This success greatly encouraged Cleomenes, and when he heard that Aratus was attacking Sparta's ally, Elis, he set off to confront them. The Spartan army fell upon the Achaean army near Mount Lycaeum and routed it. Aratus took advantage of a rumour saying that he had been killed in the battle and seized Mantinea. Aratus' victory at Mantinea reduced the Spartans' desire for war and they began to oppose Cleomenes' war effort.

Meanwhile, the Eurypontid King of Sparta, Eudamidas III, who was the son of Agis IV and Agiatis, died. Cleomenes recalled his uncle, who had fled after Agis' execution to Messene, to assume the throne. However, as soon as he returned to Sparta he was assassinated. Cleomenes' part in the assassination is unknown, with Polybius claiming that he ordered it, but Plutarch disagreeing.

Having bribed the ephors to allow him to continue campaigning, Cleomenes advanced into the territory of Megalopolis and started to besiege the village of Leuctra. As Cleomenes was besieging the village, an Achaean army under the command of Aratus attacked the Spartans. In the initial attack, the Spartans were repelled. However, Lydiadas of Megalopolis, the cavalry commander, disobeyed Aratus' order not to pursue the Spartans. When the cavalry scattered while trying to cross some difficult terrain, Cleomenes' skirmishers managed to defeat them. Encouraged by this counter-attack, the Spartans charged the main body of the Achaean army and routed them.

Confident of his strong position, Cleomenes began plotting against the ephors. After gaining the support of his stepfather, he embarked with him on a whirlwind military expedition against his opponents, and when they requested to stay in Arcadia due to exhaustion he returned to Sparta to carry out his reform plans. When he reached the city, he sent some of his loyal followers to kill the ephors. Four of the ephors were killed, while the fifth, Agylaeus, managed to escape and seek sanctuary in a temple. Having removed the ephors, Cleomenes began to implement his reforms.

== The reforms ==
After having removed the ephors, who obstructed his political will, Cleomenes used the character of Lycurgus the lawgiver, which allowed him to legitimize the violence, and he began his reforms. He first handed over all his land to the state; he was soon followed in this by his stepfather and his friends and the rest of the citizens. He divided up all the land and gave an equal lot to every citizen, a unique achievement. The land was pooled and redistributed in equal portion to some 4,000 citizens (although the first Agis plan projected 4,500 citizens). These citizens were half old citizens, the so-called inferiors, (Note: mostly Spartiates who had lost their citizenship because they could not meet the criteria –the mandatory contribution to the communal mess hall, the Syssitia– anymore, or who had lost it or had never gotten it in the first place for various other reasons) and half new citizens who for the most part were mercenaries who fought with the Spartan army. There were also Perioeci granted land for their dedication to Sparta. Those 4,000 citizens enhanced the body of Spartiates (Spartan full citizens), which had dwindled drastically (known as oliganthropia).

For the first time the amount of produce the Helots had to surrender to each klaros-holder was specified in absolute quantities rather than as a proportion of the annual yield. Cleomenes trained 4,000 Hoplites and restored the ancient Spartan military and social discipline.

The citizens' children were required to pass through an agoge, and the adult citizens had to practise again the old austere diaita centred upon communal living within the framework of the military-minded masses. More significantly, Cleomenes decreed that his new army should follow the model of the Macedonian army, a century after the bitter defeat of the Athenians and Thebans to the Macedonians at Chaeronea. This was characterised by the use of the Macedonian sarissa, a five-meter pike, which performed well over the next two campaigning seasons. Cleomenes completed his reforms by placing his brother, Eucleidas, in charge, making him the first Agiad king on the Eurypontid throne.

== Macedonian intervention ==
In 226 BC, the citizens of Mantinea appealed to Cleomenes to expel the Achaean garrison from the city. One night, he and his troops crept into the city and removed the Achaean garrison before marching off to nearby Tegea. From Tegea, the Spartans advanced into Achaea, where Cleomenes hoped to force the League to face him in a pitched battle. Cleomenes advanced with his army to Dyme and was met by the entire Achaean army. In the battle, the Spartans routed the Achaean phalanx, killing many of the Achaeans and capturing others. Following this victory, Cleomenes captured the city of Lasium and presented it to the Elians.

The oligarchies opposed the Cleomenian reforms. With Cleomenes' quick victories this opposition increased throughout all the Peloponnese. Cleomenes took Corinth and other strategic places. The Cleomenian reforms, although they were not intended to be applied to the defeated populations, was a significant factor behind the campaign successes of the Spartan king. Indeed, some of the Achaean population wanted to be debt-free and were willing to share their lands for more equity. In reality, Cleomenes did not care that much about the defeated population and chose to negotiate with the oligarchies even if the enmity between Aratus and Cleomenes was too great to enable them to come to an agreement.

After this diplomatic failure, Aratus chose to negotiate with Antigonus III Doson, King of Macedonia, who decided to go to war against Sparta. Despite numerous attempts to break through the defensive line and reach Lechaeum in the Corinth Isthmus, Antigonus' forces failed and suffered considerable losses. At that time Argos rebelled and Cleomenes had to send 2,000 men to deal with the situation. With this lack of men, Cleomenes abandoned the Isthmus and retreated to Mantinea. At this point, Cleomenes could not avoid retreating and letting the Macedonian army advance through Arcadia.

Knowing that Cleomenes had received the money to pay for his mercenaries from Ptolemy, Antigonus, according to Peter Green, seems to have ceded some territory in Asia Minor to Ptolemy in return for Ptolemy withdrawing his financial support of Sparta. After that, Cleomenes entered Megalopolis and destroyed it as well as raided the territory of Argos. The damage caused by those raids was not so much a factor of military domination for Cleomenes but rather a break in the unavoidable defeats of the Spartan army, which could not face the Macedonian army in pitched battle. In 222, at the Battle of Sellasia the Spartans were defeated during which the Macedonian cavalry overcame the Spartan cavalry. The Spartan phalanx was overwhelmed by the deeper ranks of the Macedonian phalanx and almost destroyed, and only a few Spartans escaped from the battle, with Cleomenes at their side.

== Defeat, exile and death ==
In 222 BC Cleomenes was defeated in the Battle of Sellasia by the Achaeans, who received military aid from Antigonus III Doson of Macedon. Cleomenes returned to Sparta, advised the citizens to submit to Antigonus, and fled to Alexandria to his ally Ptolemy Euergetes of Egypt, hoping for assistance in regaining his throne.

However, when Ptolemy died, his son and successor, Ptolemy Philopator neglected Cleomenes and eventually put him under house arrest. Together with his friends, he escaped his house arrest in 219 BC and tried to incite a revolt. When he received no support from the population of Alexandria, he and his friends avoided capture by committing suicide. The last to kill himself was Panteus, Cleomenes' favourite and right-hand man, who was ordered to make sure everyone was dead before taking his own life. When Panteus struck Cleomenes' ankle with the tip of his blade, he saw that the king was still alive; he kissed him and sat beside him, waiting for his last breath, and then Panteus embraced him and took his own life over the dead body of Cleomenes. Thus died the man who nearly conquered all of the Peloponnese and is described by William Smith as "the last truly great man of Sparta, and, excepting perhaps Philopoemen, of all Greece."

== Sources ==
=== Primary sources ===
- Plutarch, translated by Richard Talbert, (1988). Life of Agis. New York: Penguin Classics. ISBN 0-14-044463-7.
- Plutarch, translated by Richard Talbert, (1988). Life of Cleomenes. New York: Penguin Classics. ISBN 0-14-044463-7.
- Plutarch, translated by Richard Talbert, (1988). Plutarch on Sparta. New York: Penguin Classics. ISBN 0-14-044463-7
- Polybius, translated by Frank W. Walbank, (1979). The Rise of the Roman Empire. New York: Penguin Classics. ISBN 0-14-044362-2.
- Pausanias; W. H. S. Jones (trans.) (1918). Description of Greece. Cambridge, Massachusetts: Harvard University Press.

=== Secondary sources ===
- Paul Cartledge and Anthony Spawforth (1989). Hellenistic and Roman Sparta : A tales of two cities. London . Rooledge. ISBN 0-415-07144-5.
- Green, Peter (1990). Alexander to Actium: The Historical Evolution of the Hellenistic Age. Los Angeles: University of California Press. ISBN 0-500-01485-X.

Preceded by Leonidas II	Agiad King of Sparta; 235–222 BC	Succeeded by Agesipolis III
