= List of state leaders in the 3rd century BC =

State leaders in the 4th century BC – State leaders in the 2nd century BC – State leaders by year

This is a list of state leaders in the 3rd century BC (300–201 BC).

== Africa: North ==
- Cyrene (complete list) –

- Magas, King (276–250 BC)
- Demetrius the Fair, King (250–249 BC)

- Ptolemaic Kingdom of Egypt (complete list) –

- Ptolemy I Soter, Pharaoh (305–283/282 BC)
- Ptolemy II Philadelphus, Pharaoh (283–246 BC)
- Ptolemy III Euergetes, Pharaoh (246–222 BC)
- Ptolemy IV Philopator, Pharaoh (221–204 BC)
- Ptolemy V Epiphanes, Pharaoh (204–181 BC)

- Kush (complete list) –

- Aktisanes, King (early 3rd century BC)
- Aryamani, King (early 3rd century BC)
- Kash(...), King (early 3rd century BC)
- Piankhi-yerike-qa, King (early 3rd century BC)
- Sabrakamani, King (early 3rd century BC)
- Arakamani, King (270–260 BC)
- Amanislo, King (260–250 BC)
- Amantekha, King (mid 3rd century BC)
- Sheshep-ankh-en-Amun Setepenre, King (mid–late 3rd century BC)
- Arnekhamani, King (mid–late 3rd century BC)
- Arqamani, King (3rd–2nd century BC)

- Numidia (complete list) –

Eastern Numidia
- Zelalsen, King (344–274 BC)
- Gala, King (275–207 BC)
- Ozalces, King (207–206 BC)
- Capussa, King (206 BC)
- Lacumazes, King (206 BC)
- Masinissa, King (206–c.202 BC)
Western Numidia
- Syphax, King (ante 215–202 BC)
- Vermina, King (202 BC–?)
- Archobarzane, King (?)
Numidia
- Massinissa, King (202–148 BC)

== Asia ==
=== Asia: East ===
China: Warring States period

- Zhou, China: Eastern Zhou (complete list) –

- Nan, King (314–256 BC)

- Chu (complete list) –

- Huai, King (328–299 BC)
- Qingxiang, King (298–263 BC)
- Kaolie, King (262–238 BC)
- You, King (237–228 BC)
- Ai, King (228 BC)
- Fuchu, ruler (227–223 BC)
- Changping, Lord (223 BC)

- Han (complete list) –

- Xiang, King (311–296 BC)
- Xi, King (295–273 BC)
- Huanhui, King (272–239 BC)
- An, King (238–230 BC)

- Qi: House of Tian (complete list) –

- Xuan, King (319–300 BC)
- Min, King (300–283 BC)
- Xiang, King (283–265 BC)
- Jian, ruler (264–221 BC)

- Qin (complete list) –

- Zhaoxiang, King (306–251 BC)
- Xiaowen, King (250 BC)
- Zhuangxiang, King (250–247 BC)
- Qin Shi Huang, Emperor (246–210 BC)

- Wei (complete list) –

- Xiang, King (319–296 BC)
- Zhao, King (296–277 BC)
- Anxi, King (277–243 BC)
- Jingmin, King (243–228 BC)
- Jia, King (228–225 BC)

- Yan (complete list) –

- Xiao, King (3rd century BC)
- Xi, King (255–222 BC)

- Zhao (complete list) –

- Wuling, King (326–299 BC)
- Huiwen, King (299–266 BC)
- Xiaocheng, King (266–245 BC)
- Daoxiang, King (245–236 BC)
- Youmiu, King (236–228 BC)
- Jia, King (228–222 BC)

China: Qin dynasty

- Qin, China (complete list) –

- Qin Shi Huang

- King (246–221 BC)
- Emperor (221–210 BC)

- Qin Er Shi, Emperor (210–207 BC)
- Ziying, King (207 BC)

China: Han dynasty

- Western Han, China (complete list) –

- Gaozu

- King (206–202 BC)
- Emperor (202–195 BC)

=== Asia: Southeast ===
Vietnam

- Hồng Bàng dynasty (complete list) –

- Hùng Duệ Vương, King (408–258 BC)

- Âu Lạc (complete list) –

- An Dương Vương, King (257–207 BC)

- Triệu dynasty (complete list) –

- Zhao Tuo, King (203–137 BC)

=== Asia: South ===
India

- Maurya Empire (complete list) –

- Chandragupta, Emperor (324–297 BC)
- Bindusara, Emperor (297–273 BC)
- Ashoka, Emperor (268–232 BC)
- Dasharatha, Emperor (232–224 BC)
- Samprati, Emperor (224–215 BC)
- Shalishuka, Emperor (215–202 BC)
- Devavarman, Emperor (202–195 BC)

- Satavahana dynasty (Purana-based chronology) –

- Simuka, King (228–205 BC)
- Krishna, King (205–187 BC)

Sri Lanka

- Anuradhapura Kingdom (complete list) –

- Devanampiya Tissa, King (307–267 BC)
- Uttiya, King (267–257 BC)
- Mahasiva, King (257–247 BC)
- Suratissa, King (247–237 BC)
- Asela, King (215–205 BC)
- Sena and Guttika, Kings (237–215 BC)
- Ellalan, King (205–161 BC)

=== Asia: West ===
- Kingdom of Bithynia (complete list) –

- Zipoetes I

- Dynast (326–297 BC)
- King (297–278 BC)

- Zipoetes II, King (278–276 BC)
- Nicomedes I, King (278–255 BC)
- Etazeta, Regent (255–254 BC)
- Ziaelas, King (254–228 BC)
- Prusias I Cholus, King (228–182 BC)

- Bosporan Kingdom (complete list) –

Spartocids dynasty
- Spartacus III, King (304–284 BC)
- Pairisades II, King (284–c.245 BC)
- Spartacus IV, King (c.245–c.240 BC)
- Leucon II, King (c.240–c.220 BC)
- Hygiainon, King (c.220–c.200 BC)
- Spartacus V, King (c.200–c.180 BC)

- Kingdom of Cappadocia (complete list) –

- Ariarathes II, Suzerain King (301–280 BC)
- Ariamnes II, King (280–230 BC)
- Ariarathes III, King (255–220 BC)
- Ariarathes IV, King (220–163 BC)

- Colchis (complete list) –

- Kuji, King (325–280 BC)

- Greco-Bactrian Kingdom (complete list) –

- Diodotus I, King (c.255–c.239 BC)
- Diodotus II, King (c.252–c.223 BC)
- Antiochus Nikator, possible king (c.230 BC)
- Euthydemus I, King (c.230–c.200 BC)
- Demetrius I, King (c. 200–c. 180 BC) – also Indo-Greek King

- Indo-Greek Kingdom (complete list) –

- Demetrius I, King (c.205–171 BC) – also Indo-Bactrian King

- Parthian Empire (complete list) –

- Arsaces I, King (250–246/211 BC)
- Tiridates I, Great King, Shah (c.246–211 BC)
- Arsaces II, King (211–191 BC)

- Kingdom of Pergamon: Attalid dynasty (complete list) –

- Philetaerus, King (282–263 BC)
- Eumenes I, King (263–241 BC)
- Attalus I Soter (241–197 BC)

- Kingdom of Pontus (complete list) –

- Mithridates I Ctistes, King (281–266 BC)
- Ariobarzanes, King (266–250 BC)
- Mithridates II, King (c.245–c.210 BC)
- Mithridates III, King (c.210–c.190 BC)

- Seleucid Empire (complete list) –

- Seleucus I Nicator, King (305–281 BC)
- Antiochus I Soter, King (291–261 BC)
- Antiochus II Theos, King (261–246 BC)
- Seleucus II Callinicus, King (246–225 BC)
- Seleucus III Ceraunus, King (225–223 BC)
- Antiochus III, the Great, King (223–187 BC)

== Europe ==
=== Europe: Balkans ===
- Achaean League (complete list) –

- Margos of Keryneia 256 - 255 BC
- Aratus of Sicyon I 245 - 244 BC
- Aratus of Sicyon II 243 - 242 BC
- Aegialeas 242 - 241 BC (?)
- Aratus of Sicyon III 241 - 240 BC
- Aratus of Sicyon IV 239 - 238 BC
- Aratus of Sicyon V 237 - 236 BC
- Dioedas 236 - 235 BC (or 244 - 243 BC)
- Aratus of Sicyon VI 235 - 234 BC
- Lydiadas of Megalopolis I 234 - 233 BC
- Aratus of Sicyon VII 233 - 232 BC
- Lydiadas of Megalopolis II 232 - 231 BC
- Aratus of Sicyon VIII 231 - 230 BC
- Lydiadas of Megalopolis III 230 - 229 BC
- Aratus of Sicyon IX 229 - 228 BC
- Aristomachos of Argos 228 - 227 BC
- Aratus of Sicyon X 227 - 226 BC
- Hyperbatas 226 - 225 BC
- Timoxenos 225 - 224 BC (Aratus of Sicyon held the exceptional office of strategos autokrator)
- Aratus of Sicyon XI 224 - 223 BC
- Timoxenos 223 - 222 BC (?)
- Aratus of Sicyon XII 222 - 221 BC
- Timoxenos 221 - 220 BC
- Aratus of Sicyon XIII 220 - 219 BC
- Aratus the Younger of Sicyon 219 - 218 BC
- Epiratos of Pharae 218 - 217 BC
- Aratus of Sicyon XIV 217 - 216 BC
- Timoxenos 216 - 215 BC
- Aratus of Sicyon XV 215 - 214 BC
- Aratus of Sicyon XVI 213 BC
- Euryleon of Aegium 211 - 210 BC
- Kykliadas of Pharae 210 - 209 BC
- Philopoemen of Megalopolis I 209 - 208 BC
- Nikias 208 - 207 BC
- Philopoemen of Megalopolis II 207 - 206 BC
- Lysippos 202 - 201 BC (?)
- Philopoemen of Megalopolis III 201 - 200 BC
- Kykliadas of Pharae 200 - 199 BC

- Epirus (complete list) –

- Pyrrhus I, King (307–302 BC, 297–272 BC)
- Neoptolemos II, King (302–297 ВС)
- Alexander II, King (272–255 ВС)
- Olympias II of Epirus, Regent (255 BC–?)
- Pyrrhus II, King (255–237 BC)
- Ptolemy, King (237–234 BC)
- Pyrrhus III, King (235–c.233 BC)
- Deidamia, King (233 BC)

- Macedonia: Antigonid dynasty (complete list) –

- Demetrius I Poliorcetes, King (294–288 BC)
- Antigonus II Gonatas, King (277–274, 272–239 BC)
- Demetrius II Aetolicus, King (239–229 BC)
- Antigonus III Doson, King (229–221 BC)
- Philip V, King (221–179 BC)

- Odrysian kingdom of Thrace (complete list) –

- Seuthes III, King (331–300 BC)
- Cotys II, King (300–280 BC)
- Raizdos, King (280 BC–?)
- Cotys III, King (270 BC)
- Rhescuporis I, King (240–215 BC)
- Seuthes IV, King (215–190 BC)

- Paeonia (complete list) –

- Audoleon, King (315–285 BC)
- Ariston, King (286–285 BC)
- Leon, King (278–250 BC)
- Dropion, King (250–230 BC)

=== Europe: East ===
- Dacia (complete list) –

- Dual, King (3rd century BC)
- Rhemaxos, King (c.200 BC)
- Moskon, King (3rd century BC)
- Dromichaetes, King (3rd century BC)
- Zalmodegicus, King (late 3rd century BC)

=== Europe: South ===
- Roman Republic (complete list) –

- 300

- Marcus Valerius Corvus, Consul
- Q. Appuleius Pansa, Consul

- 299

- M. Fulvius Paetinus, Consul
- Titus Manlius Torquatus, Consul
- Marcus Valerius Corvus, Consul suffectus

- 298

- Lucius Cornelius Scipio Barbatus, Consul
- Gnaeus Fulvius Maximus Centumalus, Consul

- 297

- Quintus Fabius Maximus Rullianus, Consul
- Publius Decius Mus, Consul

- 296

- Lucius Volumnius Flamma Violens, Consul
- Appius Claudius Caecus, Consul

- 295

- Quintus Fabius Maximus Rullianus, Consul
- Publius Decius Mus, Consul

- 294

- Lucius Postumius Megellus, Consul
- Marcus Atilius Regulus, Consul

- 293

- L. Papirius Cursor, Consul
- Spurius Carvilius Maximus, Consul

- 292

- Quintus Fabius Maximus Gurges, Consul
- D. Junius Brutus Scaeva, Consul

- 291

- Lucius Postumius Megellus, Consul
- Gaius Junius Bubulcus Brutus, Consul

- 290

- Publius Cornelius Rufinus, Consul
- Manius Curius Dentatus, Consul

- 289

- M. Valerius Maximus Corvus II, Consul
- Quintus Caedicius Noctua, Consul

- 288

- Q. Marcius Tremulus II, Consul
- P. Cornelius Arvina II, Consul

- 287

- M. Claudius Marcellus, Consul
- C. Nautius Rutilus, Consul

- 286

- M. Valerius Maximus (Corvus III or Potitus?), Consul
- Gaius Aelius Paetus, Consul

- 285

- Gaius Claudius Canina, Consul
- M. Aemilius Lepidus, Consul

- 284

- C. Servilius Tucca, Consul
- Lucius Caecilius Metellus Denter, Consul
- Curius Dentatus, Consul suffectus

- 283

- Publius Cornelius Dolabella, Consul
- Gnaeus Domitius Calvinus Maximus, Consul

- 282

- Gaius Fabricius Luscinus, Consul
- Quintus Aemilius Papus, Consul

- 281

- Lucius Aemilius Barbula, Consul
- Quintus Marcius Philippus, Consul

- 280

- Publius Valerius Laevinus, Consul
- Tiberius Coruncanius, Consul

- 279

- Publius Sulpicius Saverrio, Consul
- Publius Decius Mus, Consul

- 278

- Gaius Fabricius Luscinus, Consul
- Quintus Aemilius Papus, Consul

- 277

- Publius Cornelius Rufinus, Consul
- Gaius Junius Bubulcus Brutus, Consul

- 276

- Quintus Fabius Maximus Gurges, Consul
- Gaius Genucius Clepsina, Consul

- 275

- Curius Dentatus, Consul
- Lucius Cornelius Lentulus Caudinus, Consul

- 274

- Curius Dentatus, Consul
- Ser. Cornelius Merenda, Consul

- 273

- Gaius Fabius Licinus, Consul
- Gaius Claudius Canina, Consul

- 272

- Lucius Papirius Cursor, Consul
- Spurius Carvilius Ruga#Spurius Carvilius Maximus, Consul

- 271

- Kaeso Quinctius Claudus, Consul
- Lucius Genucius Clepsina, Consul

- 270

- C. Genucius Clepsina II, Consul
- Gnaeus Cornelius Blasio, Consul

- 269

- Quintus Ogulnius Gallus, Consul
- C. Fabius Pictor, Consul

- 268

- P. Sempronius Sophus, Consul
- Ap. Claudius Russus, Consul

- 267

- Marcus Atilius Regulus, Consul
- Lucius Julius Libo, Consul

- 266

- D. Junius Pera, Consul
- N. Fabius Pictor, Consul

- 265

- Quintus Fabius Maximus Gurges, Consul
- L. Mamilius Vitulus, Consul

- 264

- Appius Claudius Caudex, Consul
- Marcus Fulvius Flaccus, Consul

- 263

- Manius Valerius Maximus Corvinus Messalla, Consul
- M' Otacilius Crassus, Consul

- 262

- Lucius Postumius Megellus, Consul
- Quintus Mamilius Vitulus, Consul

- 261

- Lucius Valerius Flaccus, Consul
- T. Otacilius Crassus, Consul

- 260

- Gnaeus Cornelius Scipio Asina, Consul
- Gaius Duilius, Consul

- 259

- Lucius Cornelius Scipio, Consul
- Gaius Aquillius Florus, Consul

- 258

- Aulus Atilius Calatinus, Consul
- Gaius Sulpicius Paterculus, Consul

- 257

- Gaius Atilius Regulus, Consul
- Cn. Cornelius Blasio II, Consul

- 256

- Lucius Manlius Vulso Longus, Consul
- Q. Caedicius, Consul
- Marcus Atilius Regulus, Consul suffectus

- 255

- Ser. Fulvius Paetinus Nobilior, Consul
- M. Aemilius Paullus, Consul

- 254

- Gnaeus Cornelius Scipio Asina, Consul
- Aulus Atilius Calatinus, Consul

- 253

- Cn. Servilius Caepio, Consul
- C. Sempronius Blaesus, Consul

- 252

- C. Aurelius Cotta, Consul
- Publius Servilius Geminus, Consul

- 251

- Lucius Caecilius Metellus, Consul
- C. Furius Pacilus, Consul

- 250

- Gaius Atilius Regulus, Consul
- Lucius Manlius Vulso Longus, Consul

- 249

- Publius Claudius Pulcher, Consul
- Lucius Junius Pullus, Consul

- 248

- C. Aurelius Cotta II, Consul
- P. Servilius Geminus II, Consul

- 247

- Lucius Caecilius Metellus, Consul
- Numerius Fabius Buteo, Consul

- 246

- M'. Otacilius Crassus II, Consul
- M. Fabius Licinus, Consul

- 245

- Marcus Fabius Buteo, Consul
- Gaius Atilius Bulbus, Consul

- 244

- Aulus Manlius Torquatus Atticus, Consul
- C. Sempronius Blaesus II, Consul

- 243

- C. Fundanius Fundulus, Consul
- Gaius Sulpicius Galus, Consul

- 242

- Gaius Lutatius Catulus, Consul
- Aulus Postumius Albinus, Consul

- 241

- Aulus Manlius Torquatus Atticus, Consul
- Quintus Lutatius Cerco, Consul

- 240

- Gaius Claudius Centho, Consul
- Marcus Sempronius Tuditanus, Consul

- 239

- Gaius Mamilius Turrinus, Consul
- Quintus Valerius Falto, Consul

- 238

- Tiberius Sempronius Gracchus, Consul
- Publius Valerius Falto, Consul

- 237

- Lucius Cornelius Lentulus Caudinus, Consul
- Quintus Fulvius Flaccus, Consul

- 236

- Publius Cornelius Lentulus Caudinus, Consul
- C. Licinius Varus, Consul

- 235

- Titus Manlius Torquatus, Consul
- C. Atilius Bulbus II, Consul

- 234

- Lucius Postumius Albinus, Consul
- Spurius Carvilius Ruga#Spurius Carvilius Maximus Ruga, Consul

- 233

- Quintus Fabius Maximus Verrucosus, Consul
- Manius Pomponius Matho, Consul

- 232

- Marcus Aemilius Lepidus, Consul
- M. Publicius Malleolus, Consul

- 231

- Marcus Pomponius Matho, Consul
- Gaius Papirius Maso, Consul

- 230

- Marcus Aemilius Barbula, Consul
- Marcus Junius Pera, Consul

- 229

- Lucius Postumius Albinus, Consul
- Gnaeus Fulvius Centumalus, Consul

- 228

- Sp. Carvilius Maximus Ruga II, Consul
- Quintus Fabius Maximus Verrucosus, Consul

- 227

- P. Valerius Flaccus, Consul
- Marcus Atilius Regulus, Consul

- 226

- Marcus Valerius Messalla, Consul
- L. Apustius Fullo, Consul

- 225

- Lucius Aemilius Papus, Consul
- Gaius Atilius Regulus, Consul

- 224

- Titus Manlius Torquatus, Consul
- Quintus Fulvius Flaccus, Consul

- 223

- Gaius Flaminius, Consul
- Publius Furius Sp.f. Philus, Consul

- 222

- Marcus Claudius Marcellus, Consul
- Gnaeus Cornelius Scipio Calvus, Consul

- 221

- Publius Cornelius Scipio Asina, Consul
- Marcus Minucius Rufus, Consul

- 220

- Marcus Valerius Laevinus, Consul
- Quintus Mucius Scaevola, Consul
- Q. Lutatius Catulus, Consul
- Lucius Veturius Philo, Consul

- 219

- Lucius Aemilius Paullus, Consul
- Marcus Livius Salinator, Consul

- 218

- Publius Cornelius Scipio, Consul
- Tiberius Sempronius Longus, Consul

- 217

- Gnaeus Servilius Geminus, Consul
- Gaius Flaminius, Consul
- Marcus Atilius Regulus, Consul suffectus

- 216

- Gaius Terentius Varro, Consul
- Lucius Aemilius Paullus, Consul

- 215

- Marcus Claudius Marcellus, Consul
- Tiberius Sempronius Gracchus, Consul
- Quintus Fabius Maximus Verrucosus, Consul suffectus

- 214

- Quintus Fabius Maximus Verrucosus, Consul
- Marcus Claudius Marcellus, Consul

- 213

- Quintus Fabius Maximus, Consul
- Tiberius Sempronius Gracchus, Consul

- 212

- Quintus Fulvius Flaccus, Consul
- Appius Claudius Pulcher, Consul

- 211

- Gnaeus Fulvius Centumalus Maximus, Consul
- Publius Sulpicius Galba Maximus, Consul

- 210

- Marcus Claudius Marcellus, Consul
- Marcus Valerius Laevinus, Consul

- 209

- Quintus Fabius Maximus Verrucosus, Consul
- Quintus Fulvius Flaccus, Consul

- 208

- Marcus Claudius Marcellus, Consul
- T. Quinctius Crispinus, Consul

- 207

- Gaius Claudius Nero, Consul
- Marcus Livius Salinator, Consul

- 206

- Lucius Veturius Philo, Consul
- Quintus Caecilius Metellus, Consul

- 205

- Publius Cornelius Scipio Africanus, Consul
- Publius Licinius Crassus Dives, Consul

- 204

- Marcus Cornelius Cethegus, Consul
- Publius Sempronius Tuditanus, Consul

- 203

- Gnaeus Servilius Caepio, Consul
- Gaius Servilius Geminus, Consul

- 202

- Marcus Servilius Pulex Geminus, Consul
- Tiberius Claudius Nero, Consul

- 201

- Gnaeus Cornelius Lentulus, Consul
- Publius Aelius Paetus, Consul

- Syracuse (complete list) –

- Agathocles, Tyrant (317–289 BC)
- Hicetas, Tyrant (289–280 BC)
- Thinion & Sosistratus, Tyrants (279–277 BC)
- Pyrrhus of Epirus, Tyrant (278–276 BC)
- Hiero II, Tyrant (275–215 BC)
- Hieronymus, Tyrant (215–214 BC)

=== Eurasia: Caucasus ===
- Kingdom of Armenia (complete list) –

- Orontes III, King (321–260 BC)
- Sames, King (c.260 BC)
- Arsames I, King (260–c.228 BC)
- Orontes IV, King (c.212–200 BC)

- Kingdom of Iberia (Kartli) (complete list) –

- Pharnavaz I, King (299–234 BC)
- Sauromaces I, King (234–159 BC)
