= Aristomachus =

Aristomachus (Ancient Greek: Ἀριστόμαχος) may refer to:

- Aristomachus (Egypt) (6th century), Byzantine official
- Aristomachus (mythology), several figures in Greek mythology
- Aristomachos I (died 240 BC), tyrant of the ancient Greek city of Argos
- Aristomachos II (died 223 BC), second son of the previous, a tyrant of the city of Argos and strategos of the Achaean League
- Aristomachus of Croton (fl. 215 BC), democratic leader who betrayed the town of Croton in Magna Graecia
- Aristomachus, a Greek writer on agriculture or domestic economy, who is quoted several times by Pliny the Elder in his Natural History (13.47, 14.24, 19.26.4.)
- Aristomachus, a sculptor born on the banks of the Strymon, who made statues of courtesans.

== See also ==
- Aristomache
