= Langon (Achaea) =

Town in Ancient Greece near the boundary between Elis and Achaea

Langon (Ancient Greek: Λάγγων) was a town near the boundary between ancient Elis and ancient Achaea. Although properly belonging to the Eleans, it appears in the territory of the Achaean city of Dyme, lying between that city and the frontiers of Elis. In 224 BCE, Spartan king Cleomenes III took Langon following his victory over Aratus of Sicyon and the Achaeans near Hecatombaeon.
