= Tyrant =

Absolute ruler unrestrained by law or constitution

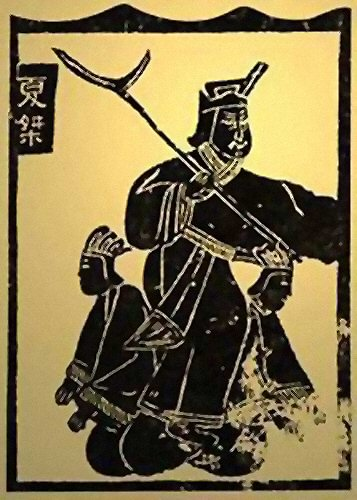
King Jie of Xia holding a Ji polearm and sitting on two ladies.

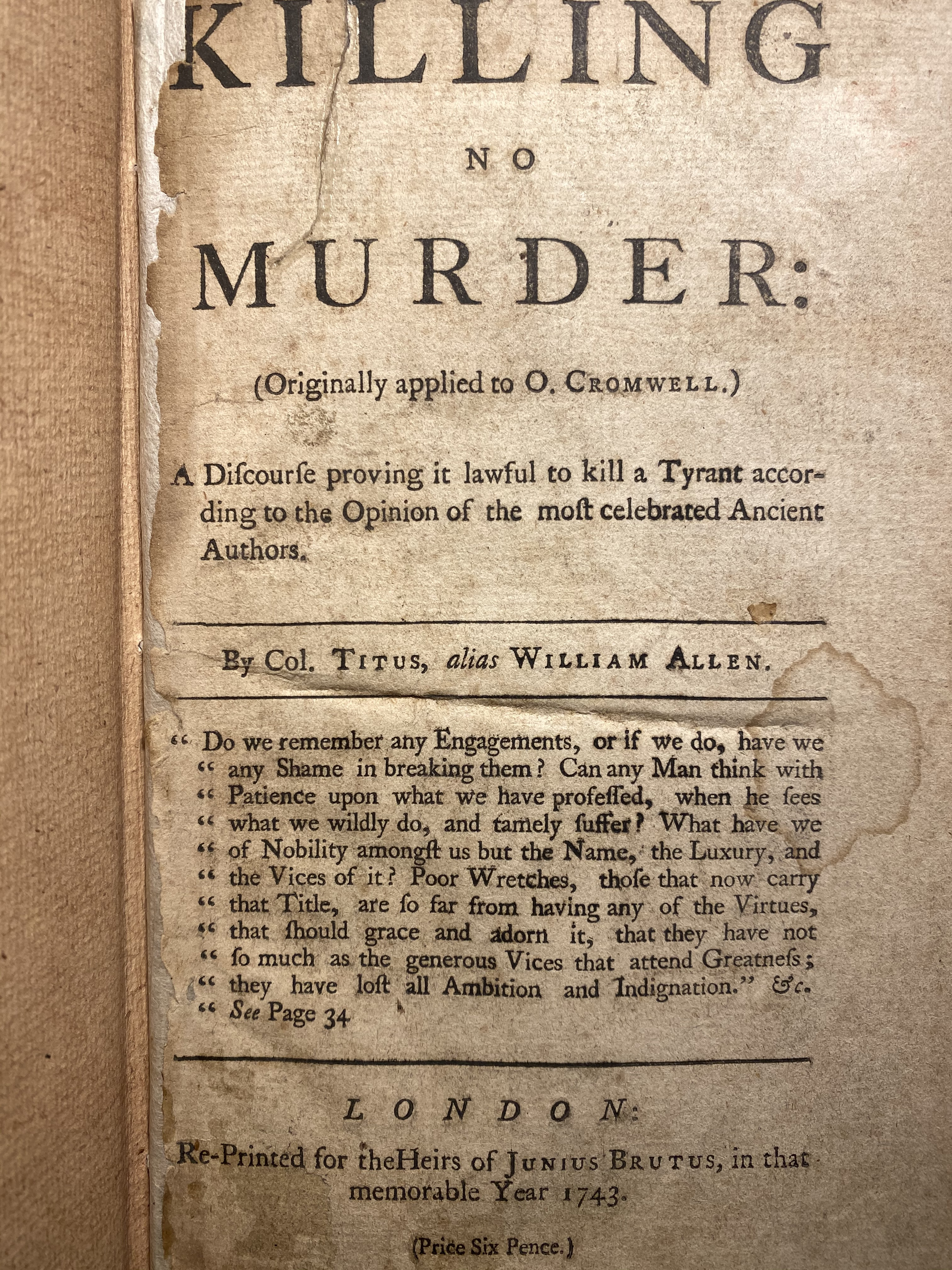
Killing No Murder, cover page, 18th century reprint of 17th century English pamphlet written to inspire and make righteous the act of assassinating Oliver Cromwell

A tyrant (from Ancient Greek τύραννος (túrannos) 'absolute ruler') is an absolute ruler who is unrestrained by law, or one who has usurped a legitimate ruler's sovereignty. Often portrayed as cruel, tyrants may defend their positions by resorting to repressive means. The original Greek term meant an absolute sovereign who came to power without constitutional right, and the word had a neutral connotation during the Archaic and early Classical periods. A government run by a tyrant is usually called a tyranny.

Ancient philosophers such as Plato and Aristotle saw tyrannos as a negative form of government, and on account of the decisive influence of philosophy on politics, deemed tyranny the "fourth and worst disorder of a state." They defined a tyrant as a person who rules without law, using extreme and cruel methods against both his own people and others. Plato in particular stated that:

Tyrants lack "the very faculty that is the instrument of judgment"—reason. The tyrannical man is enslaved because the best part of him (reason) is enslaved, and likewise, the tyrannical state is enslaved, because it too lacks reason and order.

The Encyclopédie defined the term as a usurper of sovereign power who makes "his subjects the victims of his passions and unjust desires, which he substitutes for laws". In the late fifth and fourth centuries BC, a new kind of tyrant, one who had the support of the military, arose – specifically in Sicily.

One can apply accusations of tyranny to a variety of types of government:

- to government by one individual (in an autocracy)
- to government by a minority (in an oligarchy, tyranny of the minority)
- to government by a majority (in a democracy, tyranny of the majority)

== Etymology ==
The English noun tyrant appears in Middle English use, via Old French, from the 1290s. The word derives from Latin tyrannus, meaning 'illegitimate ruler', and this in turn from the Greek τύραννος túrannos 'monarch, ruler of a polis'; túrannos is of Pre-Greek origin, perhaps from Lydian. The final -t arises in Old French by association with the present participles in -ant.

== Definition ==
"The word 'tyranny' is used with many meanings, not only by the Greeks but throughout the tradition of the great books." The Oxford English Dictionary offers alternative definitions: a ruler, an illegitimate ruler, an absolute ruler, or an oppressive, unjust, or cruel ruler. The term is usually applied to vicious autocrats who rule their subjects by brutal methods. Scholar Paul Rahe has asserted that tyrannical rule "in one form or another" has "been the norm throughout human history", and added that "it is not apt to disappear."

== Greco-Roman culture ==
Ancient Greek and Sicilian tyrants were influential opportunists that came to power by securing the support of different factions of a deme. The word tyrannos, possibly pre-Greek, Pelasgian or eastern in origin, then carried a neutral censure; it simply referred to anyone who obtained political power in a polis by extralegal means.

The Greek tyrants stayed in power by using mercenary soldiers from outside of their respective city-state. To mock tyranny, Thales wrote that the strangest thing to see is "an aged tyrant", meaning that tyrants do not have the public support to survive for long.

=== Archaic tyrants ===
One of the earliest known uses of the word 'tyrant' (in Greek) was by the poet Archilochus in reference to king Gyges of Lydia. Gyges obtained his power by killing King Candaules and marrying his queen.

The heyday of the Archaic period tyrants came in the early 6th century BC, when Cleisthenes ruled Sicyon in the Peloponnesus and Polycrates ruled Samos. During this time, revolts overthrew many governments in the Aegean world. Chilon, the ambitious and capable ephor of Sparta, built a strong alliance amongst neighboring states by making common cause with these groups seeking to oppose unpopular tyrannical rule. By intervening against the tyrants of Sicyon, Corinth and Athens, Sparta thus came to assume Hellenic leadership prior to the Persian invasions. Simultaneously, as Persia made inroads into Greece, many tyrants sought Persian aid against popular forces seeking to remove them.

==== Corinth ====
Corinth hosted one of the earliest of Greek tyrants. In Corinth, growing wealth from colonial enterprises, and the wider horizons brought about by the export of wine and oil, together with the new experiences of the Eastern Mediterranean brought back by returning mercenary hoplites employed overseas created a new environment. Conditions were right for Cypselus to overthrow the aristocratic power of the dominant but unpopular clan of Bacchiadae. Clan members were killed, executed, driven out or exiled in 657 BC. Corinth prospered economically under his rule, and Cypselus managed to rule without a bodyguard. When he then bequeathed his position to his son, Periander. Periander was less popular than his father and was reputed to be more brutal.

Nevertheless, under Cypselus and Periander, Corinth extended and tightened her control over her colonial enterprises, and exports of Corinthian pottery flourished. However, tyrants seldom succeeded in establishing an untroubled line of succession. Periander threw his pregnant wife downstairs (killing her), burnt his concubines alive, exiled his son, warred with his father-in-law and attempted to castrate 300 sons of his perceived enemies. He retained his position. Periander's successor was less fortunate and was expelled. Afterward, Corinth was ruled by an oligarchy that would eventually be overthrown in a pro-democratic revolution in the 4th century.

==== Athens ====
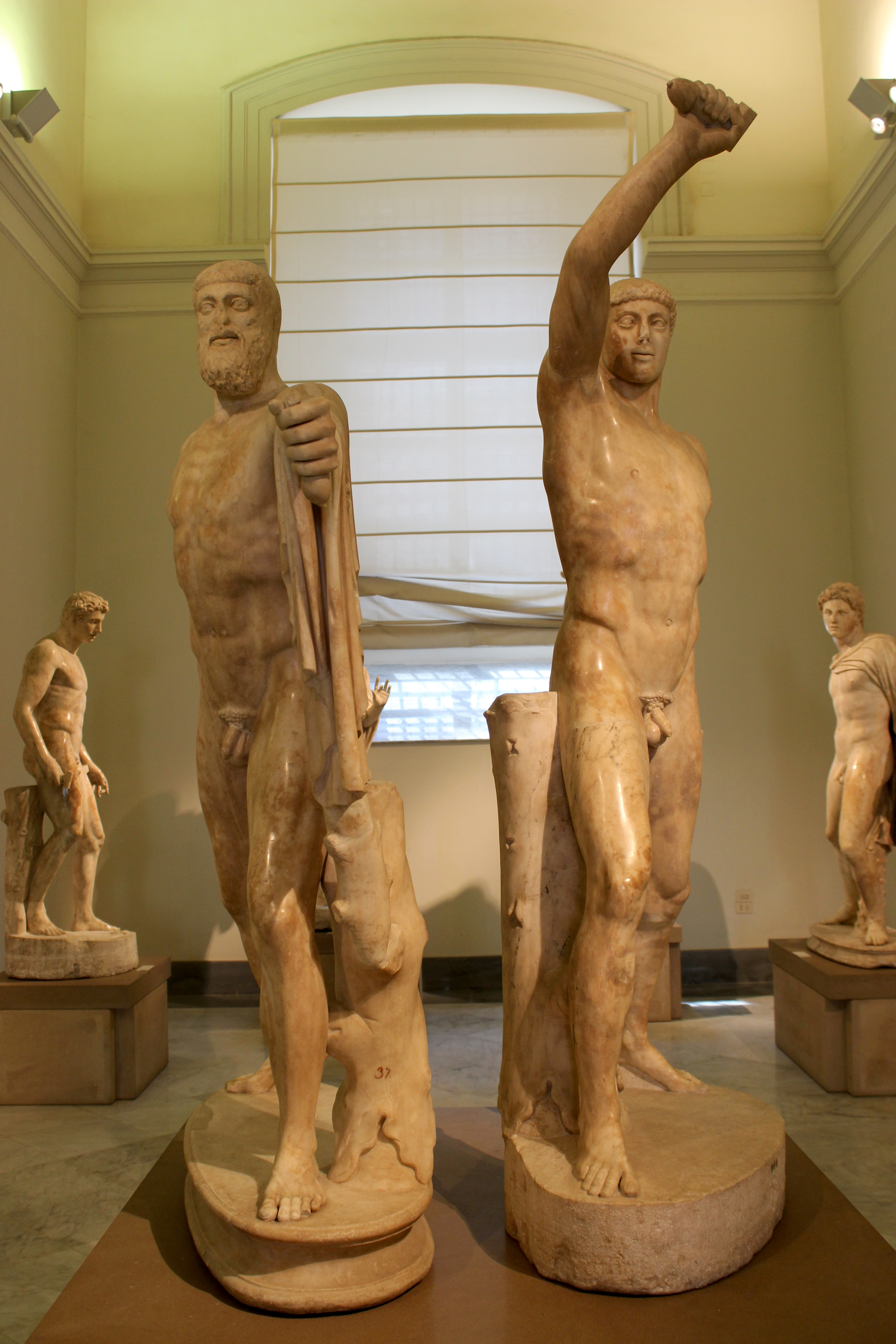
A sculptural pairing of Harmodius and Aristogeiton, who became known as the tyrannicides after they killed Hipparchus and were the preeminent symbol of Athenian democracy

Athens hosted its tyrants late in the Archaic period. In Athens, the inhabitants first gave the title of tyrant to Peisistratos (a relative of Solon, the Athenian lawgiver) who, after two failed attempts, in 546 BC succeeded in installing himself as tyrant. Supported by the prosperity of the peasantry and landowning interests of the plain, which was prospering from the rise of olive oil exports, as well as his clients from Marathon, he managed to achieve absolute power. Through an ambitious program of public works, which included fostering the state cult of Athena; encouraging the creation of festivals; supporting the Panathenaic Games in which prizes were jars of olive oil; and supporting the Dionysia (ultimately leading to the development of Athenian drama), Peisistratos remained popular.

He was followed by his sons, and with the subsequent growth of Athenian democracy, tyrant took on its familiar negative connotations. In 514 BC, Peisistratos' son, the tyrant Hipparchus, was murdered in Athens by Aristogeiton and Harmodios — referred to since as the tyrannicides (tyrant killers). In 510 Hippias, the brother of Hipparchus, was expelled by a combination of intrigue, exile and Spartan arms. The anti-tyrannical attitude became especially prevalent in Athens after 508 BC, when Cleisthenes reformed the political system so that it resembled demokratia. Hippias (Peisistratos' other son) offered to rule the Greeks on behalf of the Persians and provided military advice to the Persians against the Greeks.

=== Sicilian tyrants ===
The best known Sicilian tyrants appeared long after the Archaic period. The tyrannies of Sicily came about due to similar causes, but here the threat of Carthaginian attack prolonged tyranny, facilitating the rise of military leaders with the people united behind them. Such examples of Sicilian tyrants are Gelo, Hiero I, Dionysius the Elder, Dionysius the Younger, and Agathocles of Syracuse. The dangers threatening the lives of the Sicilian tyrants are highlighted in the moral tale of the Sword of Damocles.

=== Later tyrants ===
Under the Macedonian hegemony in the 4th and 3rd century BC a new generation of tyrants rose in Greece, especially under the rule of king Antigonus II Gonatas, who installed his puppets in many cities of the Peloponnese. Examples were Cleon of Sicyon, Aristodemus of Megalopolis, Aristomachus I of Argos, Abantidas of Sicyon, Aristippus of Argos, Lydiadas of Megalopolis, Aristomachus II of Argos, and Xenon of Hermione.

Against these rulers, in 280 BC the democratic cities started to join forces in the Achaean League which was able to expand its influence even into Corinthia, Megaris, Argolis and Arcadia. From 251 BC under the leadership of Aratus of Sicyon, the Achaeans liberated many cities, in several cases by convincing the tyrants to step down, and when Aratus died in 213 BC, Hellas had been free of tyrants for more than 15 years. The last tyrant on the Greek mainland, Nabis of Sparta, was assassinated in 192 BC.

=== Roman era ===
Roman historians like Suetonius, Tacitus, Plutarch, and Josephus often spoke of "tyranny" in opposition to "liberty". Tyranny was associated with imperial rule and those rulers who usurped too much authority from the Roman Senate. Those who were advocates of "liberty" tended to be pro-Republic and pro-Senate. For instance, regarding Julius Caesar and his assassins, Suetonius wrote:

Therefore the plots which had previously been formed separately, often by groups of two or three, were united in a general conspiracy, since even the populace no longer were pleased with present conditions, but both secretly and openly rebelled at his tyranny and cried out for defenders of their liberty.

As a result of opposing the leaders of the Second Triumvirate, Cicero was assassinated, and his head and hands "were cut off and nailed to the rostrum of the Senate" to remind everyone of the perils of opposing ruling regime.

In the Historia Augusta, the author lists thirty rulers of the Roman Empire that tried to usurp power by force, and characterized them as the Thirty Tyrants or Thirty Pretenders, though the historicity of many rulers and the list itself is in question.

Josephus identified tyrants in Biblical history (in Antiquities of the Jews) including Nimrod, Moses, the Maccabees and Herod the Great.

=== Greek political thought ===
The Greeks defined both usurpers and those inheriting rule from usurpers as tyrants. Polybius (c. 150 BC) indicated that eventually, any one-man rule (monarchy/executive) governing form would become corrupted into a tyranny.

The Greek philosophers stressed the quality of rule rather than legitimacy or absolutism. "Both Plato and Aristotle speak of the king as a good monarch and the tyrant as a bad one. Both say that monarchy, or rule by a single man, is royal when it is for the welfare of the ruled and tyrannical when it serves only the interest of the ruler. Both make lawlessness – either a violation of existing laws or government by personal fiat without settled laws – a mark of tyranny."

== In works of political science ==
Tyranny is considered an important subject, one of the "Great Ideas" of Western thought. The classics contain many references to tyranny and its causes, effects, methods, practitioners, alternatives. They consider tyranny from historical, religious, ethical, political and fictional perspectives. "If any point in political theory is indisputable, it would seem to be that tyranny is the worst corruption of government – a vicious misuse of power and a violent abuse of human beings who are subject to it." While this may represent a consensus position among the classics, it is not unanimous – Thomas Hobbes dissented, claiming no objective distinction, such as being vicious or virtuous, existed among monarchs. "They that are discontented under monarchy, call it tyranny; and they that are displeased with aristocracy, call it oligarchy: so also, they which find themselves grieved under a democracy, call it anarchy..."

The first part of Dante Alighieri's The Divine Comedy describes tyrants ("who laid hold on blood and plunder") in the seventh level of Hell, where they are submerged in boiling blood. These include Alexander the Great and Attila the Hun, and share the level with highway robbers.

Niccolò Machiavelli described tyrannical rule in The Prince, while never actually using the word "tyrant", instead referring to such individuals as "princes". This is regardless of the legitimacy of the ruler's position -- in his Discourses on Livy he even sometimes calls leaders of republics "princes". He also does not share in the traditional view of tyranny, and in his Discourses he sometimes explicitly acts as an advisor to tyrants.

The Ancient Greeks, as well as those who lived in and governed the Roman Republic, became generally quite wary of many people seeking to implement a popular coup. Shakespeare portrays the struggle of one such anti-tyrannical Roman, Marcus Junius Brutus, in his play Julius Caesar.

In Gibbon's Decline and Fall of the Roman Empire, Volume I, Chapter III, Augustus was shown to assume the power of a tyrant while sharing power with the reformed senate. "After a decent resistance, the crafty tyrant submitted to the orders of the senate; and consented to receive the government of the provinces, and the general command of the Roman armies..." Emperors "humbly professed themselves the accountable ministers of the senate, whose supreme decrees they dictated and obeyed." The Roman Empire "may be defined as an absolute monarchy disguised by the forms of a commonwealth."

== Enlightenment ==
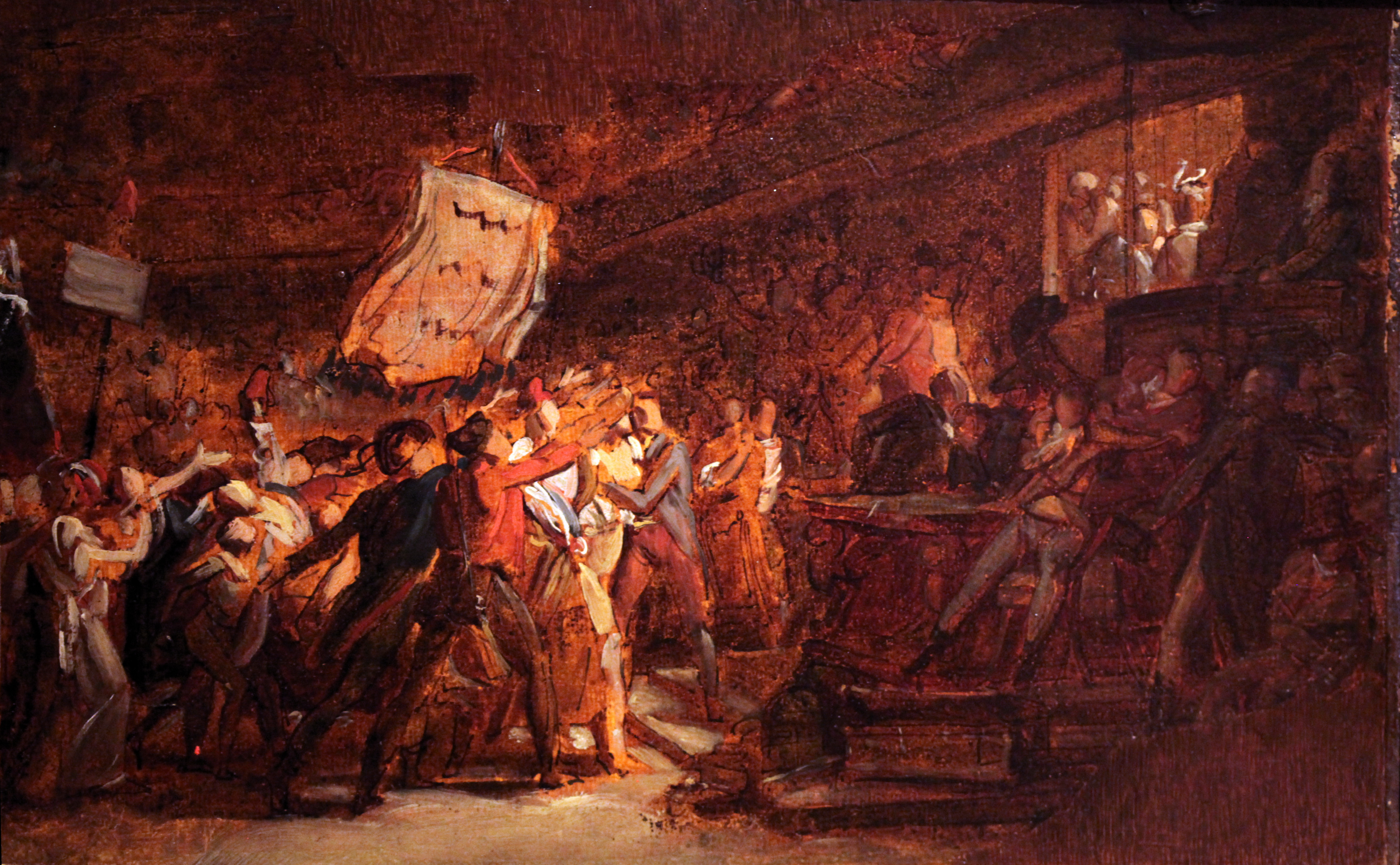
François Gérard, The French people demanding destitution of the Tyrant on 10 August 1792

During the Age of Enlightenment, Western thinkers applied the word tyranny to the system of governance that had developed around aristocracy and monarchy. The English philosopher John Locke, as part of his argument against the "Divine Right of Kings" in his 1689 book Two Treatises of Government, defined it as such: "Tyranny is the exercise of power beyond right, which nobody can have a right to; and this is making use of the power any one has in his hands, not for the good of those who are under it, but for his own private, separate advantage." Locke's concept of tyranny influenced the writers of subsequent generations who developed the concept of tyranny as counterpoint to ideas of human rights and democracy. American statesman Thomas Jefferson described the actions of King George III as "tyrannical" in the United States Declaration of Independence.

Enlightenment philosophers seemed to define tyranny by its associated characteristics.

- "The sovereign is called a tyrant who knows no laws but his caprice." Voltaire in a Philosophical Dictionary
- "Where Law ends Tyranny begins." Locke in Two Treatises of Government

Edward Sexby's 1657 pamphlet, "Killing, No Murder" outlined 14 key traits of a tyrant, as the pamphlet was written to inspire the assassination of Oliver Cromwell, and show in what circumstances an assassination might be considered honorable. The full document mulls over and references points on the matter from early pre-Christian history, up into the 17th century when the pamphlet was writ. Of the most prevailing traits of tyranny outlined, "Killing, No Murder" emphasizes:

1. Prior military leadership service – tyrants are often former captains or generals, which allows them to assume a degree of honor, loyalty, and reputability regarding matters of state
2. Fraud over force – most tyrants are likely to manipulate their way into supreme power rather than force it militarily
3. Defamation and/or disbanding of formerly respectable persons, intellectuals, or institutions, and the discouragement of refined thinking or public involvement in state affairs
4. Absence or minimalization of collective input, bargaining, or debate (assemblies, conferences, etc.)
5. Amplification of military activity for the purposes of public distraction, raising new levies, or opening future business pathways
6. Tit-for-tat symbiosis in domestic relations: e.g. finding religious ideas permissible insofar as they are useful and flattering of the tyrant; finding aristocrats or the nobility laudable & honorable insofar as they are compliant with the will of the tyrant or in service of the tyrant, etc.
7. Pretenses toward inspiration from God
8. Pretenses toward a love of God and religion
9. Grow or maintain public impoverishment as a way of removing the efficacy of the people's will

In Scotland, Samuel Rutherford's Lex Rex and Alexander Shields' A Hind Let Loose were influential works of theology written in opposition to tyranny.

A modern tyrant might be defined by proven violation of international criminal law such as crimes against humanity.

== Lists of tyrants ==
Various lists of tyrants include:

- 100 throughout history, including 40 from the 20th century
- 13 20th century tyrants
- 20 tyrants of the early 21st century

There are also numerous book titles which identify tyrants by name or circumstances.

Among English rulers, several have been identified as tyrants by book title: John, King of England (who signed the Magna Carta), Henry VIII of England and Oliver Cromwell.

Wallechinsky stated that all leaders were once tyrants in their own ways. Daniel Chirot noted that "The very essence of politics in agrarian civilizations was, by our contemporary democratic standards, tyrannical".

== Methods of obtaining and retaining power ==
The path of a tyrant can appear easy and pleasant (for all but the aristocracy). In 1939, Will Durant wrote:

Hence the road to power in Greece commercial cities was simple: to attack the aristocracy, defend the poor, and come to an understanding with the middle classes. Arrived at power, the dictator abolished debts, or confiscated large estates, taxed the rich to finance public works, or otherwise redistributed the over-concentrated wealth; and while attaching the masses to himself through such measures, he secured the support of the business community by promoting trade with state coinage and commercial treaties, and by raising the social prestige of the bourgeoisie. Forced to depend upon popularity instead of hereditary power, the dictatorships for the most part kept out of war, supported religion, maintained order, promoted morality, favored the higher status of women, encouraged the arts, and lavished revenues upon the beautification of their cities. And they did all these things, in many cases, while preserving the forms of popular government, so that even under despotism the people learned the ways of liberty. When the dictatorship [of the tyrant] had served to destroy the aristocracy the people destroyed the dictatorship; and only a few changes were needed to make democracy of freemen a reality as well as a form.

=== Obtaining ===
In the Republic, Plato stated: "The people have always some champion whom they set over them and nurse into greatness. [...] This and no other is the root from which a tyrant springs; when he first appears he is a protector".

Tyrants either inherit the position from a previous ruler, rise up the ranks in the military/party or seize power as new men.

The political methods of obtaining power were occasionally supplemented by deceit or force. Peisistratus of Athens blamed self-inflicted wounds on enemies to justify a bodyguard which he used to seize power. He later appeared with a woman dressed as a goddess to suggest divine sanction of his rule. The third time he used mercenaries to seize and retain power. Dionysius of Syracuse seized power in a similar fashion, claiming that he had been the object of a plot by enemies in order to obtain an armed force around his person.

=== Retaining ===
Lengthy recommendations of methods were made to tyrants by Aristotle (in Politics for example) and Niccolò Machiavelli (in The Prince). These are, in general, force and fraud. They include hiring bodyguards, stirring up wars to keep the people busy and dependent, purges, assassinations, and unwarranted searches and seizures. Aristotle suggested an alternative means of retaining power – ruling justly.

The methods of tyrants to retain power include placating world opinion by staging rigged elections, using or threatening to use violence, seeking popular support by appeals to patriotism, and claiming that conditions have improved.

== See also ==
- Big lie
- Despotism
- Dictator
- Dictatorship
- Outposts of tyranny
- Political repression
- State terrorism
- Tyrannicide
