= Aristippus (disambiguation) =

Aristippus may refer to:

- Aristippus of Larissa, 5th century BCE Aleuadae
- Aristippus (lived c. 400 BC), founder of the Cyrenaic school of philosophy
- Aristippus the Younger (lived c. 325 BC), grandson of Aristippus, and also a Cyrenaic philosopher
- Aristippus, tyrant of Argos mentioned in Plutarch's Pyrrhus, who achieved power through the aid of Antigonus II Gonatas around 272 BCE; possibly grandfather of Aristippus of Argos.
- Aristippus of Argos (died 235 BC), tyrant of Argos
- Henry Aristippus (died 1162), medieval Sicilian translator, scholar, and courtier
