= Hecatombaeon =

Ancient Greek town

Hecatombaeon or Hekatombaion (Ancient Greek: Ἑκατόμβαιον) was a town of ancient Achaea in the territory of Dyme, between that city and the frontiers of Elis. In 224 BCE, near Hecatombaeon Aratus of Sicyon and the Achaeans were defeated by Spartan king Cleomenes III, who followed up his victory by gaining possession of Langon.
