= Aristomachos I =

3rd-century BC tyrant of Argos

Aristomachos the Elder was a tyrant of the ancient Greek city of Argos. Around 249 BC he was an intermediate in the peace between the city of Athens and Alexander of Corinth. In 240 he survived a rebellion ordered by Aratus of Sicyon, but was soon after killed by his slaves. He was succeeded by his sons Aristippos and Aristomachos.
