= Hyperbatas =

Hyperuatas or Hypervatas (Ancient Greek: Ὑπερβατᾶς) was a general of the Achaean League in Ancient Greece who served only for a year, 226–225 BC.

It was under his nominal command, though the real direction of affairs was in the hands of Aratus of Sicyon, that the Achaeans met with the decisive defeat at the Battle of Dyme near Hecatombaeon.

| Preceded by Aratos of Sicyon | Strategos of the Achaean League; 226 BC – 225 BC | Succeeded by Timoxenos |
