= Lydiadas of Megalopolis =

Tyrant of Megalopolis

Lydiadas of Megalopolis (Ancient Greek: Λυδιάδας ὁ Μεγαλοπολίτης) or Lydiades (Λυδιάδης) was an ancient Greek tyrant of his city Megalopolis in Arcadia. He came to power around the year 245 BC, but after ten years he decided to step down, leading his city to join the Achaean League. As a reward the Achaeans elected him to the post of strategos, that is (commanding general) of the League, for three terms in 234/33, 232/31 and 230/29 BC. In 227 BC he lost the elections against Aratus of Sicyon, but was chosen as hipparch, in this position he fell at the gates of his city during a cavalry charge against the Spartan king Cleomenes III.

== Biography ==
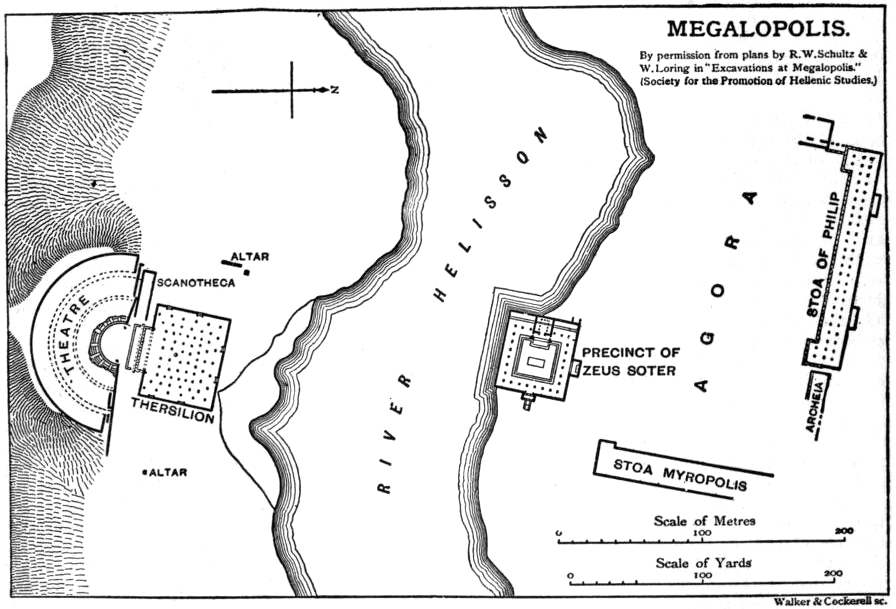
Plan of ancient Megalopolis

Probably a son of Eudamus from Caphyae, Lydiadas was raised as a citizen of Megalopolis. Almost nothing is known of the steps by which he rose to power, but the sources represent him as a man of an ambitious yet generous character, who was misled by false rhetorical arguments to believe that a monarchical government was the best for his fellow-citizens. His elevation appeared to have taken place about the time that Antigonus Gonatas made himself master of Corinth (244 BC) Pausanias mentions him as one of the commanders of the forces of Megalopolis at the battle of Mantineia (c. 249 BC) against the Spartans under Agis

As he was associated on that occasion with another general, Leocydes, it may be inferred that he had not then established himself in absolute power. If he came to power around 245 BC, he had held the position for power about ten years, when the progress of the Achaean League and the fame of its leader Aratus of Sicyon led him to form projects more worthy of his ambition. After the fall of the tyrant Aristippus of Argos, instead of waiting until he was attacked in his turn, Lydiadas determined voluntarily to abdicate as tyrant and permit Megalopolis to join the Achaean League as a free state. This generous resolution was rewarded by the Achaeans by the election of Lydiadas to the prestigious post of strategos or commander-in-chief of the confederacy the following year 233 BC.

His desire for fame and his wish to distinguish the year of his command through some brilliant exploit led him to plan an expedition against Sparta, which was, however, opposed by Aratus, who is said to have already begun to be jealous of Lydiadas' favour and reputation. Lydiadas, indeed, proved to be a formidable rival; he quickly rose to such esteem in the league as to be deemed second only to Aratus, and notwithstanding the opposition of the latter, was elected strategos a second and third time, holding that important office alternately with Aratus. The most bitter enmity had by this time arisen between the two men. Each strove to undermine the other in the popular estimation. But though Lydiadas was unable to shake Aratus' long-established standing, he maintained his ground, not withstanding the insidious attacks of his rival, and the suspicion that naturally attached to one who had formerly borne the name of tyrant.

In 227 BC, the conduct of Aratus, in avoiding a battle with Cleomenes III of Sparta at Pallantium, gave Lydiadas fresh cause to renew his attacks, but they were again unsuccessful, and he was unable to prevent the appointment of Aratus for the twelfth time to the office of strategos, in 226 BC. Instead, Lydiadas was elected hipparch and had to serve under the command of his rival. The two armies under Aratus and Cleomenes met a short distance from Megalopolis, and though Aratus would not consent to bring on a general engagement, Lydiadas, with the cavalry under his command, charged the right wing of the enemy and put them to the rout, but being led by his eagerness to pursue them too far, got entangled in some enclosures, where his troops suffered severely, and he himself fell, after a gallant resistance. His body was left on the field, but Cleomenes had the generosity to honour a fallen foe, and sent it back to Megalopolis, adorned with the insignia of royal dignity.

== Bibliography ==
- "Lydiades (1)", William Smith (ed.). Dictionary of Greek and Roman Biography and Mythology. 2. Boston: Little, Brown & Co., 1867.
- "Lydiadas of Megalopolis", Emma Nicholson (2017) The Encyclopedia of Ancient History, R. S. Bagnall, K. Brodersen, C. B. Champion, A. Erskine and S. R. Huebner (eds.).

Preceded by Aratos of Sicyon	Strategos of the Achaean League; 234 BC – 233 BC	Succeeded by Aratos of Sicyon
Preceded by Aratos of Sicyon	Strategos of the Achaean League; 232 BC – 231 BC	Succeeded by Aratos of Sicyon
Preceded by Aratos of Sicyon	Strategos of the Achaean League; 230 BC – 229 BC	Succeeded by Aratos of Sicyon
Preceded by -	Hipparch of the Achaean League; 227 BC – †	Succeeded by -
