= Aristomachos II =

3rd-century BC Greek general

Aristomachos of Argos (Ancient Greek: Ἀριστόμαχος) was a general of the Achaean League in Ancient Greece who served only for a year, 228 – 227 BCE. His father Aristomachos the Elder and his brother Aristippos had both been tyrants of the city of Argos, and after the latter's death in 235 BCE the younger brother became tyrant himself. In 229 BCE he was convinced to resign by Aratus of Sicyon and let his city join the Achaean League. As a reward, he was elected strategos of the League. Later he betrayed Argos to Cleomenes of Sparta. When Argos was retaken by the forces of Achaea and Macedonia (Aratus having made an alliance with Antigonus III Doson), he was tortured and executed, probably in 223 BCE.

Preceded by Lydiadas of Megalopolis	Strategos of the Achaean League; 228 BC – 227 BC	Succeeded by Aratos of Sicyon
