= Dioedas =

Ancient Greek general

Dioedas (Ancient Greek: Διοίδας) was the third known general of the Achaean League in Ancient Greece who served only for a year, 244 – 243 BC.

Preceded by Aratos of Sicyon	Strategos of the Achaean League; 244 – 243 BC	Succeeded by Aratos of Sicyon
