= Hipparchus (cavalry officer) =

Military title in ancient Greece

Hipparchus, anglicized hipparch (Greek: ἵππαρχος, romanized: hipparchos), was the title of an ancient Greek cavalry officer, commanding a hipparchia (unit of about 500 horsemen).
