= Timoxenos =

Timoxenos (Greek: Τιμόξενος) was a general in Ancient Greece, who served for three or four terms as strategos of the Achaean League between 226 and 215 BC. He was considered a supporter of Aratus of Sicyon.

Preceded by Hyperuatas	Strategos of the Achaean League; 226 BC – 225 BC	Succeeded by Aratos of Sicyon
