= Aegialeus (strategos) =

Aegialeus (Ancient Greek: Αἰγιαλεύς) was the fifth strategos (elected general) of the Achaean League in Ancient Greece, who served for only a year, 242–241 BC.

Preceded by Aratos of Sicyon	Strategos of the Achaean League; 242 BC – 241 BC	Succeeded by Aratos of Sicyon
