= Eperatus =

3rd-century BCE ancient Greek general

Eperatus (Ancient Greek: Ἐπήρατος) of Pharae in Achaea was an ancient Greek general of the 3rd century BC.

He was elected strategos of the Achaean League in 219 BC. This was done by the intrigues of Apelles, the adviser of Philip V of Macedon, and in opposition to Timoxenus, who was supported by Aratus of Sicyon. Eperatus was held universally in low estimation, and was in fact totally unfit for his office, on which he entered in 218 BC, so that when his year had expired he left numerous difficulties to Aratus, who succeeded him.

Preceded by Aratos of Sicyon	Strategos of the Achaean League; 218 BC – 217 BC	Succeeded by Aratos of Sicyon
