= Aristippus of Argos =

3rd-century BC Greek tyrant of Argos

Aristippus of Argos (/ˌærəˈstɪpəs/; Ancient Greek: Ἀρίστιππος) was a tyrant of Argos in the 3rd century BC. His father was the tyrant Aristomachos the Elder. When Aristomachus was assassinated by slaves in 240, Aristippus took control of the city.

After resisting several assaults by the Achaean League under Aratus of Sicyon, Aristippus was killed during an unsuccessful counterattack on the city of Cleonae in 235. He was succeeded by his younger brother Aristomachos of Argos who later led his city to join the Achaean League.

An Argive, a different person from the preceding, who also became tyrant of Argos after the murder of Aristomachus I, in the time of Aratus. He is described by Plutarch as a "pernicious tyrant". Aratus made many attempts to deprive him of the tyranny without success; but Aristippus finally fell in a battle against Aratus, and was succeeded in the tyranny by Aristomachus II.
