= Aratus of Sicyon =

Greek statesman and general (271–213 BCE)

Aratus of Sicyon Strategos of the Achaean League, Founder and Saviour of Sicyon
- Ἄρατος
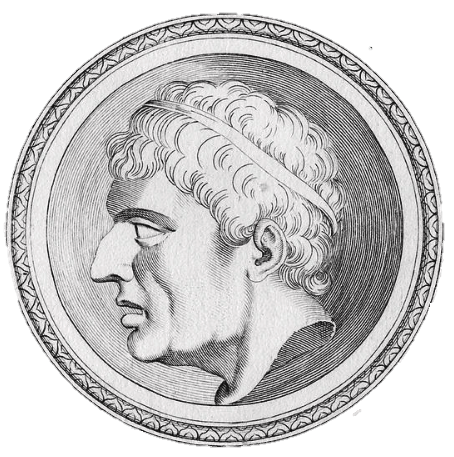
- Aratus of Sicyon, as depicted in the Promptuarii Iconum Insigniorum (1553)
- Born: 271 BC; Sicyon
- Died: 213 BC; Aegium
- Burial place: Sicyon
- Military career
- Allegiance: Achaean League
- Rank: Strategos
- Service number: 245-213 BC (with intervals)
- Conflicts: Cleomenean War; Battle of Sellasia; Social War
- Other work: Advisor of Philip V of Macedon

Aratus of Sicyon (Ancient Greek: Ἄρατος ὁ Σικυώνιος; 271–213 BC) was a politician and military commander of Hellenistic Greece. He was elected strategos of the Achaean League 17 times, leading the League through numerous military campaigns including the Cleomenean War and the Social War.

Aratus was exiled to Argos at the age of seven, after his father, the magistrate of Sicyon, was killed in a coup. In 251 BC, he led an expedition composed of other exiles which freed Sicyon from tyranny, and assumed power in the city. Sicyon joined the Achaean League, in which Aratus would later be elected strategos. In his first major campaign as strategos, he seized the Macedonian-held citadel of Acrocorinth, previously believed impregnable.

After conquering the Acrocorinth, Aratus pursued the Achaean League's expansion. When the Spartan king Cleomenes III conquered the Achaean cities of Argos and Corinth, Aratus succeeded in securing an alliance with his own erstwhile enemy Antigonus III Doson of Macedon. Cleomenes III was defeated at the Battle of Sellasia by the joint Achaean and Macedonian forces. During the Social War against the Aetolian League, Aratus became one of the prime advisors of the new king of Macedon, Philip V. Aratus died in 213 BC, allegedly poisoned by Philip.

== Youth ==
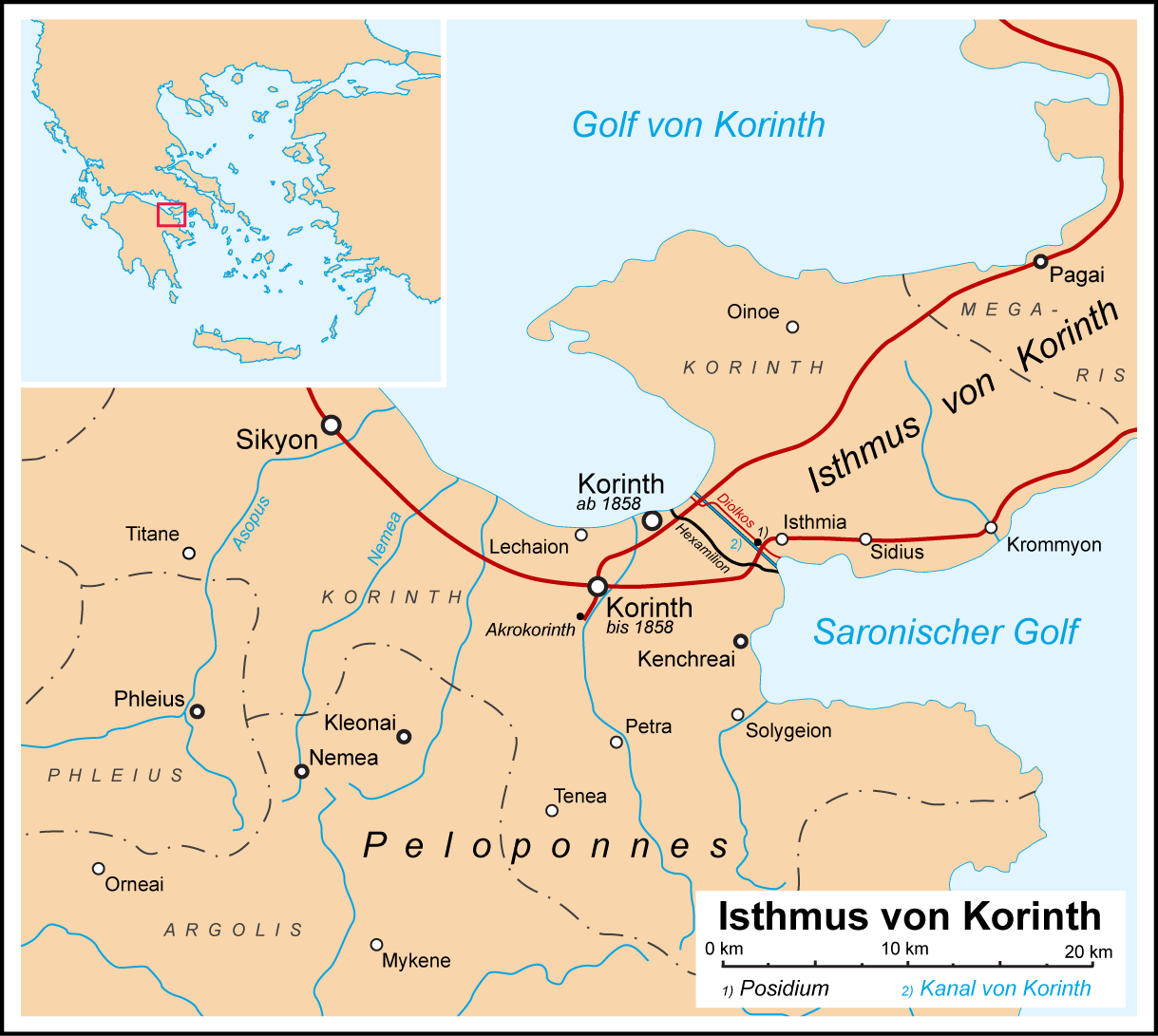
Location of Sicyon

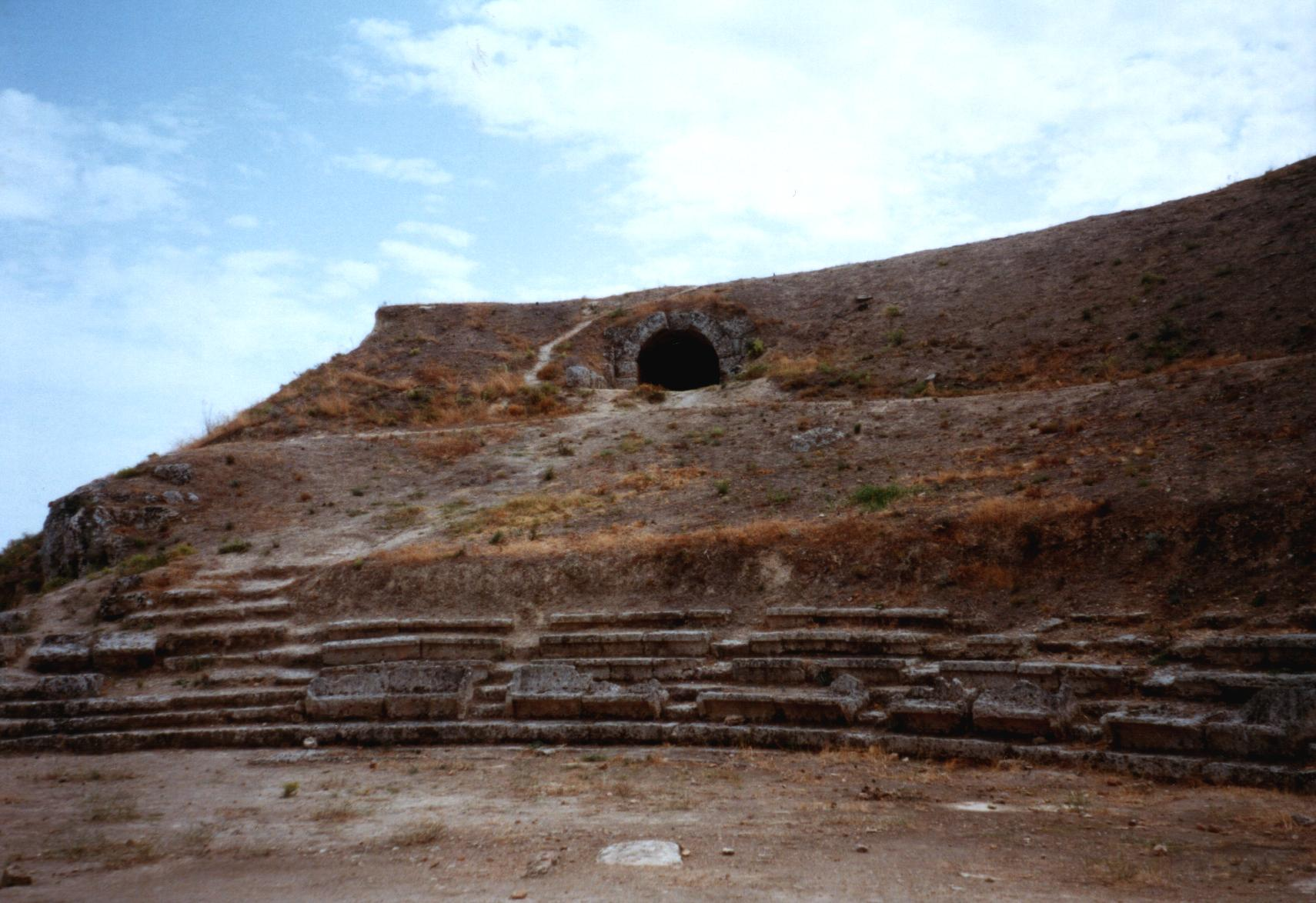
Sicyon's theatre, built by Aratus' father

Aratus was born in 271 BC in the northern Peloponnese city-state of Sicyon. His father, Cleinias of Sicyon, had become head magistrate of the city (jointly with Timocleidas) after the murder of the previous tyrant. Shortly after the government stabilised, Timocleidas died. In 264 BC, Abantidas murdered Cleinias and proclaimed himself tyrant. The seven-year-old Aratus escaped the coup with the help of his aunt, (Note: His aunt, Soso, was married to Cleinias' brother, Prophantus, and was also the sister of Abantidas.) who, in the confusion, was able to hide the boy until nightfall and then smuggle him out of Sicyon to Argos. He was raised in Argos by friends of his father, living there until 251 BC.

In Argos, Aratus initially became known as a good athlete, winning a prize in the pentathlon. But he remained focused on the idea of freeing his home city from tyranny. Despite his youth, he was able to gain widespread support among fellow exiles, becoming the leader of the exiles' party.

In Sicyon, Abantidas was killed by two philosophers. Abantidas was replaced by his own father, who was subsequently killed and replaced by Nicocles. Aratus began to seek support from the kings of Macedon and Egypt. Plutarch reports that Nicocles' main cause of concern about Aratus was the younger man's elevated connections.

== Liberating Sicyon ==
In 251 BC, Aratus had originally intended to take and hold a fortified post near Sicyon from which he could raid his enemies' property, and where sympathisers could join him. But a political prisoner recently escaped from the tyrant's prison in Sicyon suggested a better plan, saying that the escape route he had taken out of Sicyon could easily be used by men with ladders to get back into the city by scaling its defensive walls.

Aratus armed his men in secret. To mislead the tyrant's spies at Argos, he pretended to feast on the day of his planned coup. Once the spies had gone, Aratus joined his men waiting outside the city and led them to Sicyon, aiming to reach and scale the city walls while the light was still low. They were almost given away by the city's watchdogs, but the guards failed to recognise the danger. At dawn, the intruders took the barracks guards prisoner. The tyrant, Nicocles, managed to escape through a tunnel. Rumours of the attack spread fast across the city, and some of the citizens set fire to the tyrant's house. Aratus did not intervene to stop the looting, allowing citizens free rein after thirteen years of tyranny.

=== Consolidating Sicyon ===
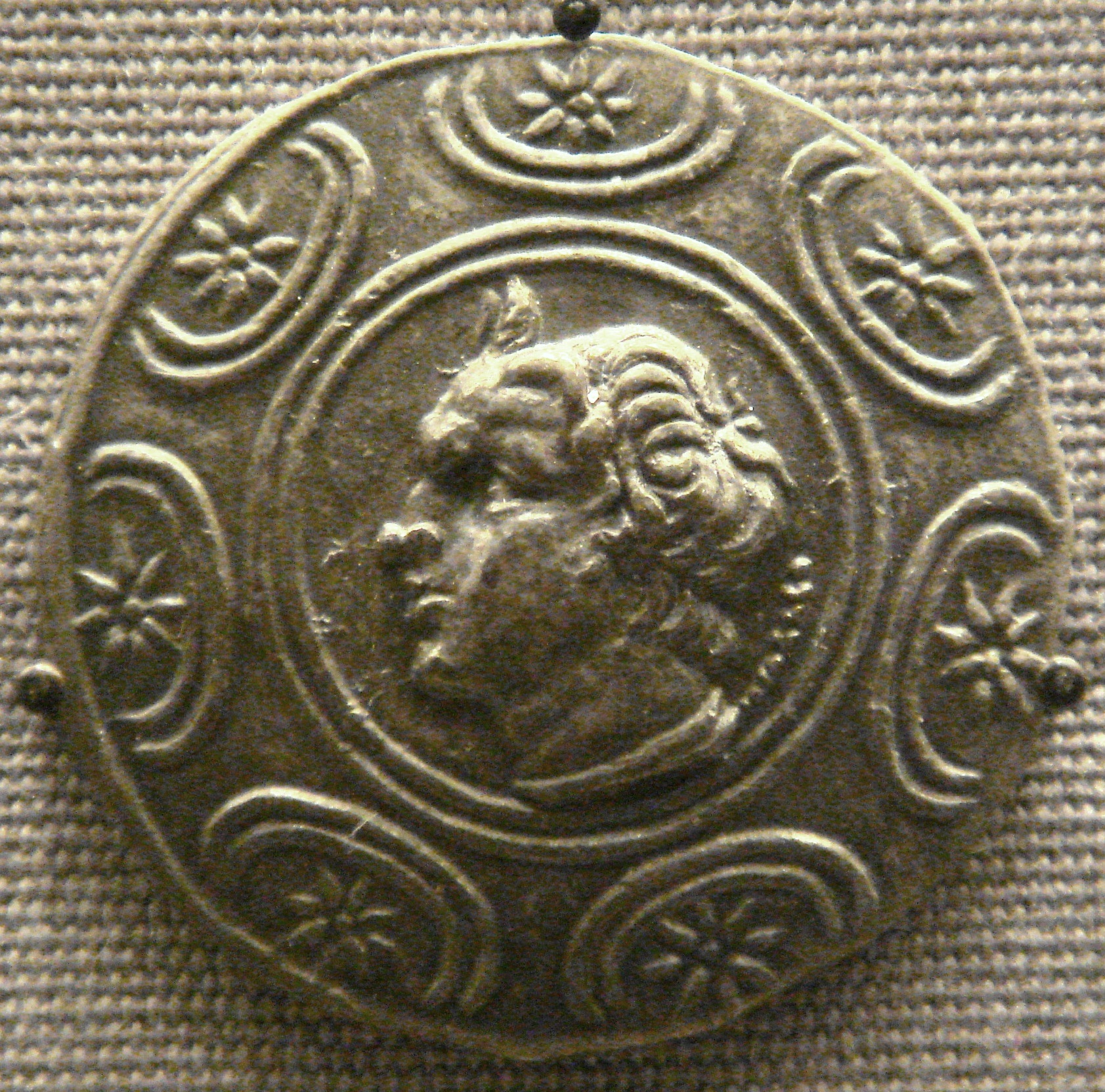
Coin of Antigonus Gonatas, king of Macedon

Aratus' first act after taking Sicyon was to call back its exiles. According to Plutarch, he recalled 80 who had been banished by Nicocles, and a further 500 besides them. The returning exiles sought to reclaim their confiscated property, and civil war threatened. Plutarch reports that one of the two kings Aratus had earlier petitioned for support gave him 25 talents of silver as a personal gift and goodwill gesture. It is not clear whether this was Antigonus Gonatas, the king of Macedon, or Ptolemy II Philadelphos, the pharaoh of Egypt. Antigonus probably hoped that Aratus would prove a useful Macedonian puppet in the Peloponnese. Ptolemy had just won Corinth from the Macedonian empire, and would have liked to increase his success. Aratus gave the money away to his fellow citizens and, probably also in 251 BC, decided to attach Sicyon to the Achaean League. It was the first time the League had admitted a non-Achaean polis (Sicyon was Dorian).

But Sicyon had become economically unstable. Aratus could now no longer rely for help on an alliance with Macedon's Antigonus, as the Achaean League was a rival of Macedon in Greece. He was left little choice but to turn to Ptolemy II Philadelphus in Egypt. Plutarch recounts the events of his journey to the court at Alexandria, from which he returned with 40 talents and the promise of another 110. Back in Sicyon, Aratus did not want sole responsibility for distributing the money, and established a committee which included himself and fifteen other members for the task. The funds received from Ptolemy II enabled Aratus to resolve the political problems in Sicyon. Grateful citizens erected a bronze statue to honour him. Events during the rest of the period between 251 and 245 BC remain obscure, although it is known that Aratus served for four or five years as a cavalryman in the Achaean militia.

== Strategos of the Achaean League ==
=== Taking the Acrocorinth ===
In 245 BC, Aratus was elected strategos of the Achaean League. He went on to hold this position every two years until his death, with only a few interruptions. (Note: Nobody could be elected strategos in two consecutive years.) Aratus' career was marked by the expansion of the League. His first known act as strategos was to pillage the countryside of Locris and Calydon. He also led a 10,000-strong army to help the Boeotians against the Aetolian League.

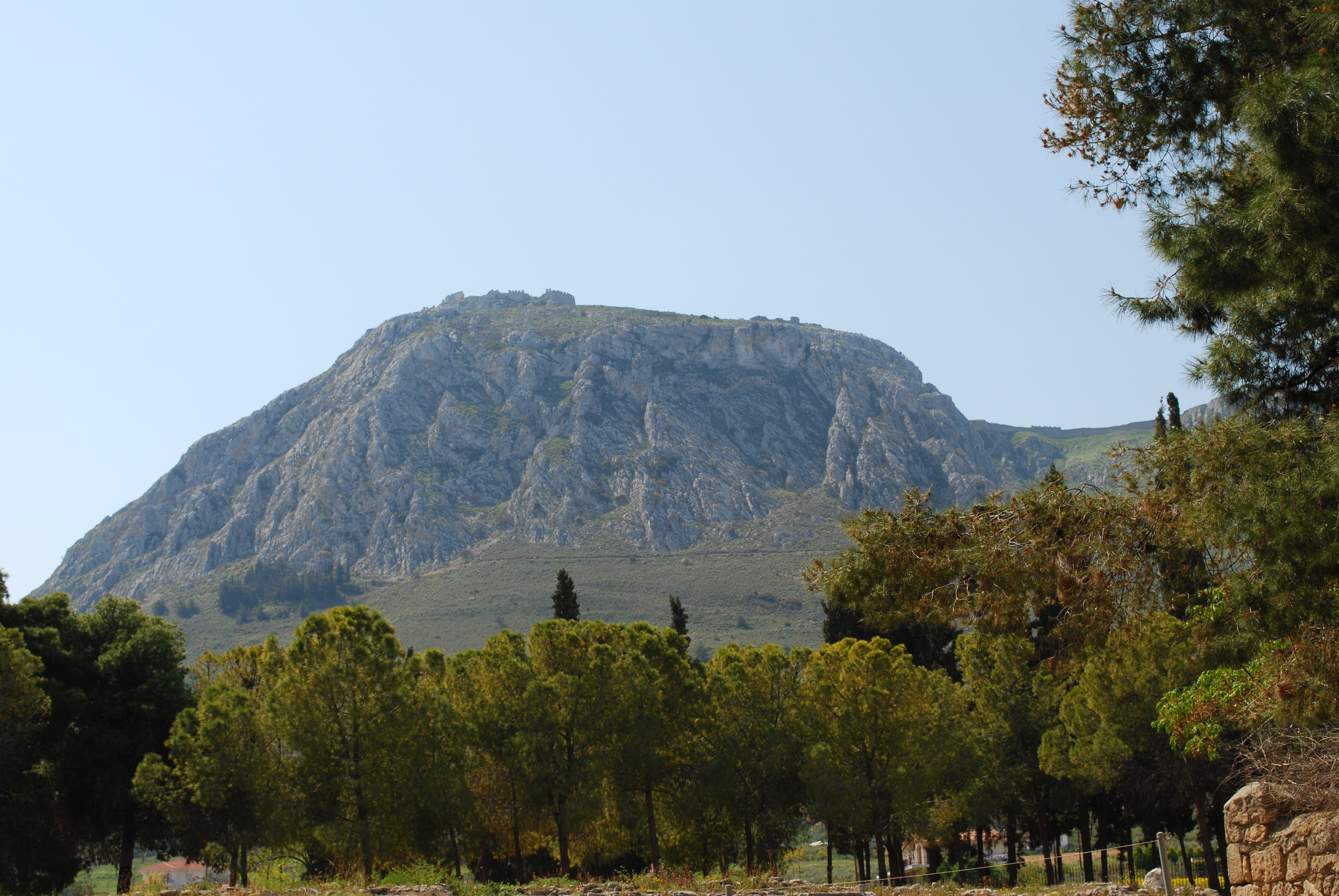
The hill on which the Acrocorinth stood

In his second term, Aratus focused on capturing the Acrocorinth, the acropolis of Corinth. The city of Corinth controlled entry to the Peloponnese, and was an important trading post. The Acrocorinth was a formidable fortress, built on a hill nearly 2,000 feet (610 m) high. It had a freshwater source, was surrounded by cliffs, and was capped by a massive, walled citadel. Antigonus Gonatas controlled the Acrocorinth with a strong garrison under his commander Persaeus. In 243 BC, Aratus learned from Syrian mercenaries that there was a less steep access route to the hill, where the wall was also at its lowest point. By midsummer that year, Aratus was ready to attack the Acrocorinth.

Aratus assembled his army in Sicyon. The majority waited on the road between Sicyon and the Acrocorinth, while Aratus himself went to the city with a select force of 400 men. Eight were sent forward to overwhelm the guards before 100 soldiers scaled the walls with ladders. Each was barefoot to minimise noise. They encountered a group of guards on entering the city, and killed three. But a fourth escaped and raised the alarm. Aratus and his soldiers got as far as the citadel itself, attempting to scale its walls as defenders hurled projectiles down on them. In the meantime, 300 more soldiers had scaled the outer walls, but then struggled to find Aratus inside the city. The waiting Achaean army below was at risk of being trapped between the citadel's defenders and a group of Macedonian soldiers arriving from the city, but was saved by those 300 soldiers, who were able to attack and rout the Macedonians from behind. The 300 men then went back to support their commander at the citadel. Weather conditions proved favourable for Aratus:

(…) the light of the full moon also made their arms appear more numerous to the enemy than they really were, owing to the length of their line of march, and the echoes of the night gave the impression that the shouts proceeded from many times the number there really were.

— Plutarch, Parallel Lives, Life of Aratus, 22.5

Aratus' soldiers scaled the walls of the citadel and the garrison surrendered. By dawn, the Achaeans held both citadel and city, in a victory owing partly to luck but also to good planning and nerve. The storming of the near-impregnable Acrocorinth was another major accomplishment for Aratus, following his taking of Sicyon. Very few achieved the feat; among those who did was Demetrius I, "the Besieger". Aratus went on to capture Lechaeum, the harbour of Corinth, and secure the 25 Macedonian warships docked there. He garrisoned the captured citadel with 400 Achaeans and 50 watchdogs.

=== Alliance with Sparta ===
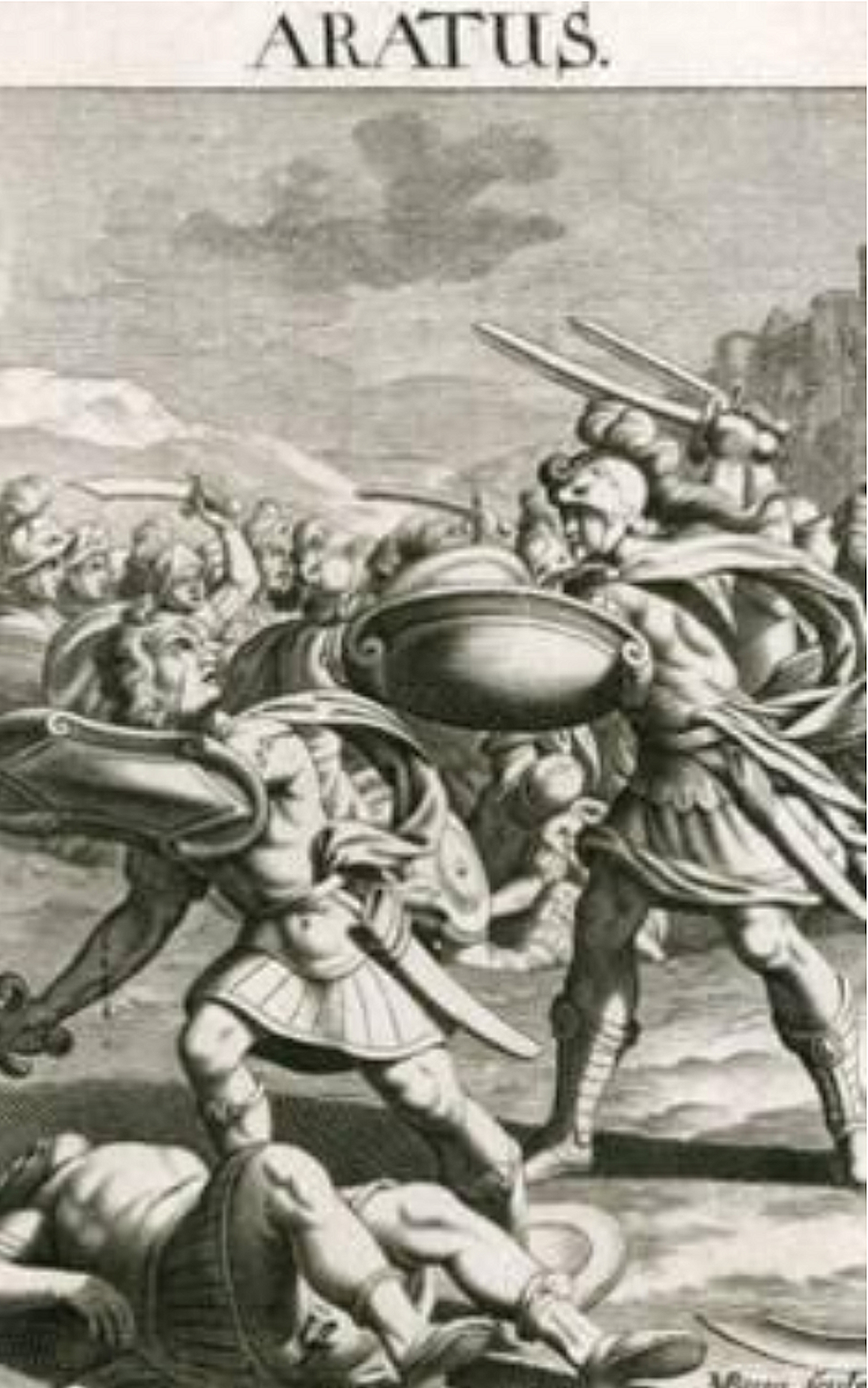
Late 17th-century print: Aratus in combat

After its capture by Aratus, Corinth also joined the Achaean League. It was followed shortly afterwards by Megara, Troezen, and Epidaurus. The Achaean League gained more renown when Ptolemy III Euergetes, the new king of Egypt, was elected hegemon. Both the League and rival Macedon then sought new allies. The Macedonian king Antigonus chose the Aetolian League, which had ambitions of working with him to defeat the Achaean League and then share out the conquered territory. The Achaean League allied with Sparta, one of the most powerful poleis of Greece.

In 241 BC, during Aratus' third term as strategos, the Aetolian League invaded the Peloponnese. Aratus and the Spartan king, Agis IV, agreed to defend the Isthmus of Corinth together, but disagreed on strategy. Agis IV wanted to defeat the Aetolians in a pitched battle. But Aratus wanted to avoid immediate fighting, on the grounds that the Aetolians could only cause limited damage at that time as crops had already been harvested and stored. It is unclear whether this reasoning truly reflected Aratus' thinking, or whether he regretted his alliance with Sparta. It has also been suggested that this was one of the episodes of Aratus' life in which he lost his nerve in military matters.

The Spartan army returned home, ending the alliance. The impact was immediately felt. The front line could no longer be held, allowing the Aetolians to invade the Peloponnese and capture Pellene, one of the first members of the Achaean League. In response, Aratus marched on the Aetolians with the soldiers he had available, finding them in disarray and routing them easily.

By 240 BC it had become clear to Antigonus that the Aetolians might not be ideal allies, and he sued for peace with the Achaeans. This peace did not last. The 80-year-old king died the following year, and was succeeded by his son Demetrius II.

=== Expanding the League ===
==== Setbacks at Argos ====
After the death of Antigonus, the Achaean and Aetolian Leagues allied with each other. The reason behind this alliance remains obscure, and the alliance itself only lasted ten years. Aratus maintained his focus on expanding the Achaean League, by "liberating even more cities in Greece from tyranny". Those cities Included Argos, Athens, and Megalopolis. In Argos, the citizens had already had plans to rise against the tyrant, but lacked sufficient weaponry. Aratus assisted them, smuggling a shipment of weapons into the city. The coup however failed. Aratus reached the city with his army afterwards, but to no avail, and when the Argives sued him for breaking the peace he was convicted by a Peloponnesian court of arbitration in Mantineia.

Aratus remained determined to liberate Argos. In 235 BC he made another attempt, and succeeded in entering the city by attacking at night. But the Argives were reluctant to support him. Aratus was wounded in the thigh by a spear. He ordered a retreat, but the timing was unfortunate. The retreat emboldened the tyrant, Aristippus of Argos, who had been preparing to flee the city.

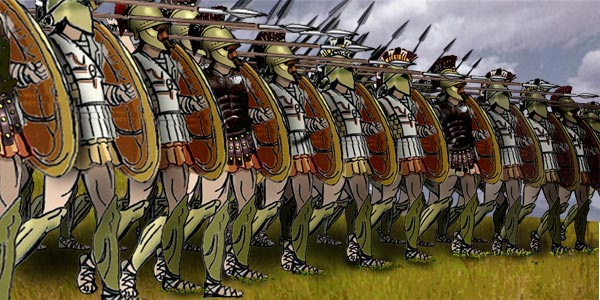
A traditional Greek phalanx

The Battle of the river Xerias went very different on the two wings. The Achaeans routed the enemy left flank, but Aratus, leading the other wing under the walls, retreated to the outrage of his officers, allowing Aristippus to claim victory. The next day, after forming up his army for battle, Aratus noticed that the enemy had gained numerical superiority through reinforcements and ordered withdrawal.

Next, maybe during his retreat to Corinth, Aratus convinced the city of Cleonae to join the Achaean League. There, he celebrated the Nemean Games, and sold into slavery some mercenaries disguised as athletes trying to join the Argive camp.

On hearing of Aristippus' determination to attack Cleonae, Aratus immediately mobilised his army at Corinth. When the Argives at first did not show up, Aratus decided on a ploy to lure them. He retreated his army with blowing fanfares to Cenchreae, but the same night returned and entered Cleonae hiding behind the walls. When the Argives approached the following morning preparing their ladders, the Achaeans sallied forth, surprised and routed the Argive army. Aristippus was killed, together with 1,500 other soldiers. It was reported that the Achaeans lost no soldiers at all. And still the victory did not bring the desired downfall of the tyrants of Argos, as Aristippus' brother Aristomachus returned just in time to close the gates and make himself the new tyrant of the city.

==== Annexation of Megalopolis ====
The city of Megalopolis was founded in 368 BC by the members of the Arcadian League as a stronghold against Sparta. Until 235 BC, its tyrant, Lydiades, had tried to maintain good relationships with Macedon. That year, on becoming aware of Aratus' expansionist plans in the Peloponnese; the death of Aristippus; and events in Sparta, Lydiades decided to give up his power by joining the Achaean League. This apparently unselfish deed had important consequences, as Orchomenus and Mantinea soon followed suit. In 234/3 BC, Lydiades was elected strategos, the first of his three terms. (Note: This may have been part of the agreement when Megalopolis joined the League.) The event also marked the beginning of a tradition of Megapolitan strategoi in the League, most notably Philopoemen.

The Achaean League became a significant power through the efforts of Aratus; a mighty confederation with an organised army financed by tax revenue, controlling all of the northern Peloponnese.

=== War against Demetrius ===
Realising that the Achaean League had become a major player in Greece with the incorporation of Megalopolis, Demetrius II, the new king of Macedon, decided to take action. In 233 BC, he sent an army to the Peloponnese commanded by a general Bithys. They defeated the Achaeans near Phylacia, probably close to Tegea, although the details of the battle are unknown. Aratus apparently succeeded in escaping the battlefield and reaching Corinth, but reports began to spread that he had been killed or taken prisoner. According to Plutarch, this news was enthusiastically received in Athens and the Macedonian governor of Piraeus sent a letter to the Corinthians exhorting them to abandon the Achaeans since their leader was dead. (Note: An inscription indicating that Bithys was made an honorary citizen of Athens suggests that Macedon's victory over Aratus was joyfully received. At least some Athenians had no great liking for Aratus despite his wish to liberate the city from Macedonian rule.) The plan was thwarted by Aratus presenting himself to the envoys bearing the letter.

After an unsuccessful punitive expedition into Attica by Aratus, the war ended in 229 BC, when the Macedonian king Demetrius was killed in battle against invading Celtic tribes.

As the succession to the throne of Macedon was not immediately clear, the Athenians chanced the occasion to expel the weakened Macedonian garrison. Although Aratus was sick at that time, and was not the current strategos of the League, he hurried to their aid, persuading the commander of the Macedonian garrison, Diogenes, to surrender Piraeus, Munychia, Salamis, and Sunium to Athens in exchange for 150 talents, twenty of which Aratus paid himself. For the first time since 294 BC, the city was again self-governing. Nevertheless, Athens refused the invitation to join the Achaean League.

Under similar circumstances Aristomachus of Argos also abandoned the Macedonian alliance and joined the Achaean League, as Lydiadas of Megalopolis had done. The following year, 228 BC, Aristomachus was elected strategos.

After Demetrius' death, Antigonus III Doson became regent for the child-king Philip V of Macedon. He secured the northern frontier of his kingdom, and concluded a treaty with the Aetolians in about 228 BC.

About the same time, the alliance between Achaeans and Aetolians lost cohesion as the Aetolian leadership favoured Sparta over the Achaeans in Eastern Arcadia.

=== Cleomenean War ===
Map of the most important locations of the Cleomenean War (Achaean League in red)

==== Cleomenes gains the upper hand ====
In 229 BC, Cleomenes III of Sparta took three Arcadian cities from the Aetolian League: Tegea, Orchomenus, and Mantinea. It is unclear why the Aetolian League tolerated this move. (Note: Polybius reports that the Aetolian League allowed the Spartans to take these cities because of their poor relationship with the Achaean League.) The Achaean League did not like this development, because of the cities' strategic importance.

The ephors urged Cleomenes also to take the Athenaeum, a fortress on the road between Sparta and Arcadia. The fortress belonged both to Megalopolis and to the Achaean League. The Achaean League saw this move by Sparta as a declaration of war. Aratus, again strategos, tried to organise nightly attacks to regain control of Tegea and Orchomenus, but was betrayed by his partisans in both cities, who told Cleomenes of the plan.

The ephors called Cleomenes back to Sparta, probably seeking to avoid all-out war. It was too late. With Cleomenes absent, Aratus took Caphyae. Cleomenes was dispatched once more and took a small Arcadian settlement. In 227 BC, the Achaean army marched out with 20,000 infantry, accompanied by another 1,000 infantry under Aristomachus, to defeat Cleomenes in a pitched battle. The Spartans had only 5,000 men, but their reputation still inspired fear in other Greeks. Aratus persuaded Aristomachus to pull back, which displeased Lydiades, the former tyrant of Megalopolis. Tensions were evident within the expanded Achaean League.

The following year, in 226 BC, Aratus' army was defeated near Mount Lycaeum in Arcadia. The circumstances of the battle are unclear, but Achaean losses were heavy. Aratus was still able to turn this incident to his advantage, as it allowed him to march in secret to Mantinea and take that city. Importantly, this opened up the route from Argos to Megalopolis. From Mantinea, Aratus marched on to besiege Orchomenus. But Cleomenes marched for Megalopolis, capturing the fortress of Leuctra, 10 km from the city. Aratus came to the aid of the Megalopolitans, and was able to drive the Spartans back, but then failed to capitalise on his victory as the Spartans were able to fall back to a position of strength. Lydiades, furious, launched a cavalry attack on the newly organised Spartan troops, but Aratus did not follow and Lydiades was defeated and killed. The Spartans regained courage from this success, and attacked and routed the entire Achaean army.

The defeat brought scorn on Aratus. An Achaean assembly voted to stop funding him. Aratus resolved to resign the office of general, but rethought and stayed on, again displaying his resilience. He marched with an Achaean army to Orchomenus, there defeating a Spartan army commanded by Cleomenes' father-in-law, who was captured and then quickly ransomed.

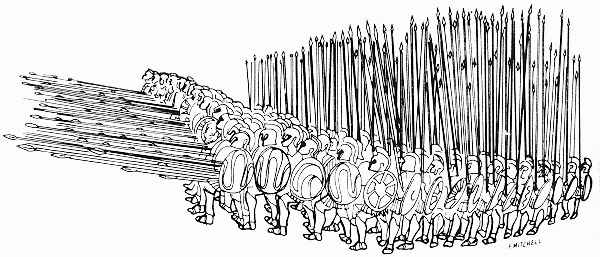
The Spartans soldiers were armed in the "Macedonian way" after Cleomenes' reforms.

In 226 BC, Cleomenes conquered Mantinea, Tegea and Pharae. He succeeded in luring the Achaeans into open battle in the fall of 226 BC. Details of the engagement are not known, but the reformed Spartan army, now armed in the Macedonian style, won a decisive victory. The Achaeans sued for peace, and were rejected. Aratus began negotiating an alliance between Macedon and the Achaean League, but Macedon demanded the return of the Acrocorinth in return for intervening. The Achaeans were not prepared to give up the citadel, and negotiations broke down.

In 225 BC, Cleomenes attacked Achaean territory again, aiming to take Aratus' home city, Sicyon. He hoped this would provoke the collapse of the entire Achaean League, as tensions within the League were already running high over Aratus' Macedonian strategy. If Sicyon fell, Aratus would no longer be part of the Achaean League. The plan to take Sicyon failed, but Cleomenes did conquer Pellene, Pheneus, Penteleum, and later Agros. The Argives, never the most enthusiastic members of the Achaean League, decided to ally with Sparta. Many authors see in this the hand of Aristomachus, former tyrant of the city. Aratus was given plenipotentiary powers to deal with the crisis. He marched to Corinth, arriving to face an angry mob: the population had heard of his intention to surrender the city and its citadel to Antigonus. Aratus only narrowly escaped. The Corinthians offered to surrender the city to Cleomenes, even while the Acrocorinth was still held by an Achaean garrison. Cleomenes marched towards Corinth, taking many other cities in Argolis on his way. After laying siege to the Acrocorinth, Cleomenes proposed a peace treaty to Aratus, who refused. The Spartan king went on to besiege Sicyon, pillaging the surrounding countryside.

==== Macedonian intervention ====
The Isthmus of Corinth

Shortly before the start of the siege, the Achaean council members decided to accept Macedon's war conditions after all. Aratus sent his son to Macedon as a hostage. Antigonus was ready with an army of 20,000 infantry and 3,000 cavalry. When Cleomenes heard of the Macedonian intervention, he abandoned the siege of Sicyon as fast as possible, moving to the Isthmus of Corinth, a better position from which to meet the northern threat. Aratus went to meet the Macedonian king near Pagae:

He had no very great confidence in Antigonus, and put no trust in the Macedonians. For he knew that his own rise to power had been a consequence of the harm he had done to them, and that he had found the first and the chief basis for his conduct of affairs in his hatred towards the former Antigonus [Gonatas]. But seeing how inexorable was the necessity laid upon him in the demands of the hour, to which those we call rulers are slaves, he went on towards the dread ordeal.

— Plutarch, Parallel Lives, Life of Aratus, 43.1–2

Both hard-headed realists, Aratus and Antigonus got along well despite their wariness. Plutarch reports that at one point, during a banquet, they even shared a blanket to keep warm.

Cleomenes' defensive front near the Isthmus of Corinth proved very effective. It took Antigonus a long time to overcome it, and he lost men while trying to break through near Lechaeum. Later, a delegation from Argos asked Aratus to liberate their city from the Spartans, as Cleomenes had failed to deliver on his promises. Aratus sailed to Epidaurus with 1,500 troops to attack Argos, but found that it had fallen already to an internal uprising with the help of Timoxenos, then strategos of the Achaean League. Sparta was left almost undefended. Cleomenes was forced to return to Sparta as a result, and leave his defences near the Isthmus. This allowed Antigonus to enter the Peloponnese, where he occupied the Acrocorinth and put a garrison in the city.

==== Battle of Sellasia ====
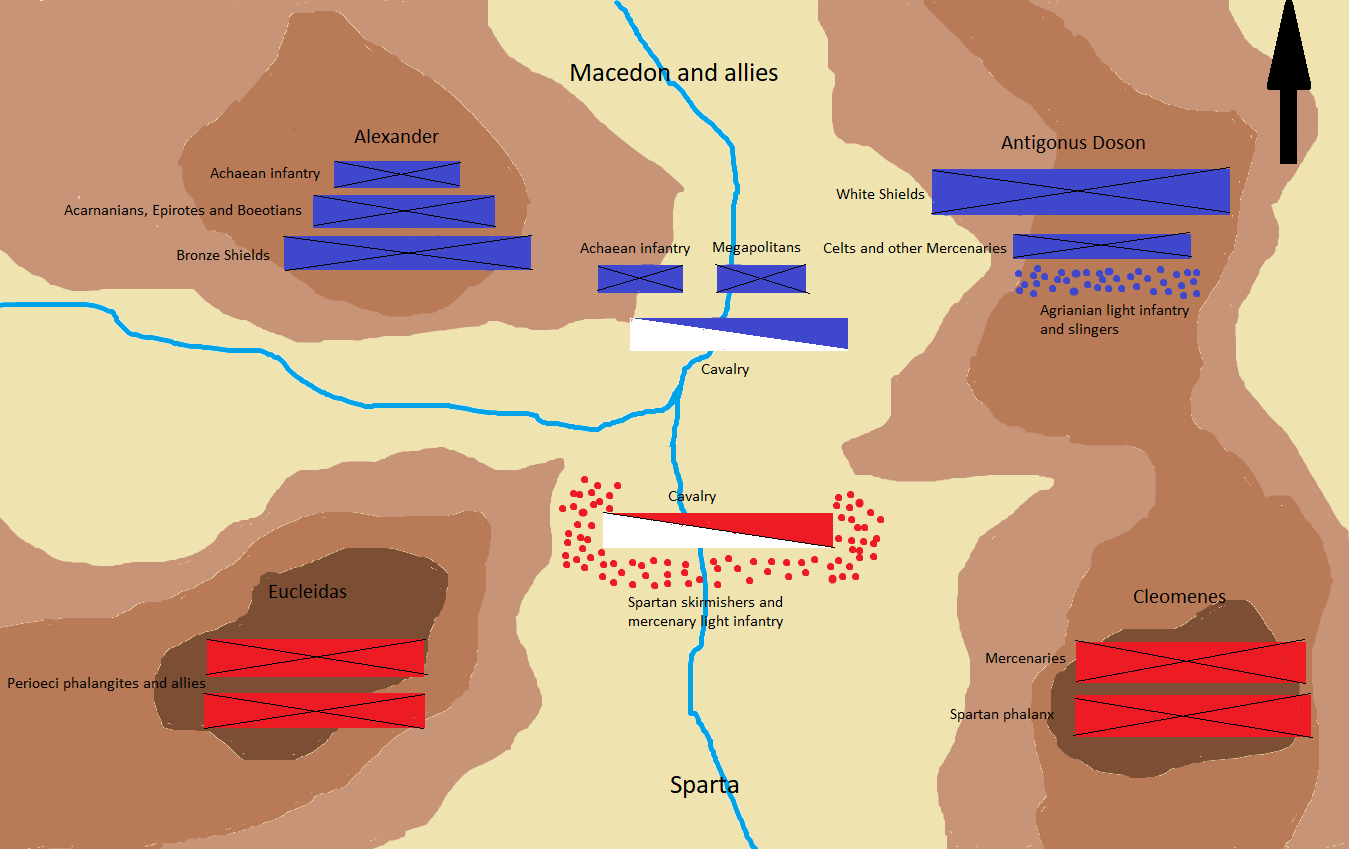
Opposing armies in the Battle of Sellasia

In 224 BC, while Antigonus was liberating the occupied cities in the Peloponnese, Cleomenes was reinforcing his army. The winter of 223 BC saw Cleomenes feign a march to Tegea, but then turn for Megalopolis, where he took the city by surprise. Around a thousand citizens escaped, finding shelter in Messene. Megalopolis itself was pillaged. Aratus reportedly wept while reporting this news to the Achaean council. Antigonus recalled his troops from winter quarters, but soon realised there was insufficient time. Cleomenes, emboldened, marched on Argos, pillaging the countryside in the hope that the population would be enraged by Antigonus' lack of action. But ultimately, Cleomenes' acts served only to antagonise the inhabitants of the Peloponnese.

Antigonus was able to rally his army, now numbering some 27,600 infantry and 1,200 cavalry. Cleomenes occupied the pass near Sellasia, before Sparta, to stop the Macedonian king. But he was defeated at the Battle of Sellasia in July 222 BC, and fled to Egypt. Antigonus conquered Sparta, but treated the city leniently and left again some days later.

=== Social War ===
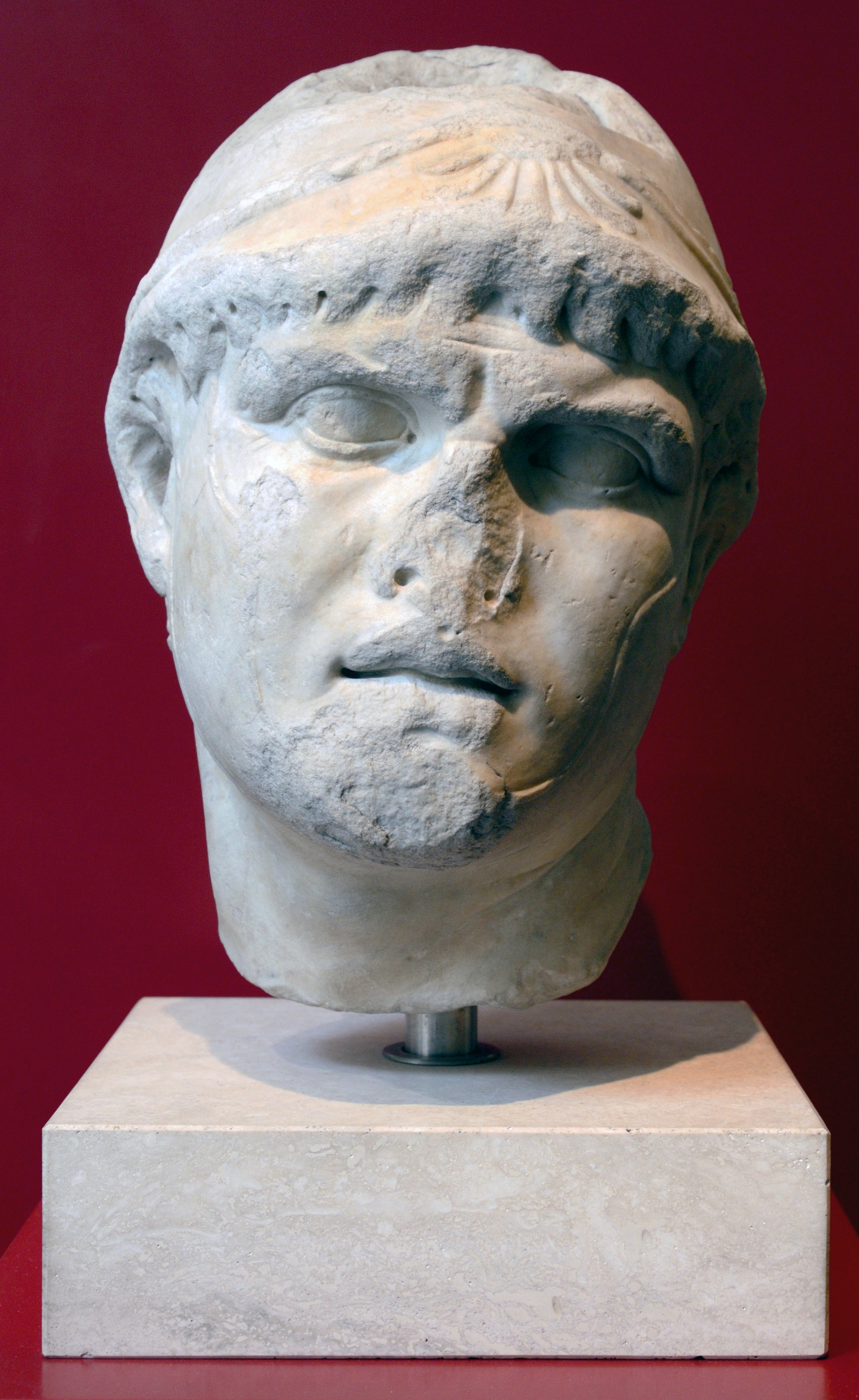
Philip V, king of Macedon and Aratus' ally

In 221 BC, the Aetolians began pillaging the territory of Messenia. In 220 BC, the council of the Achaean League met in Aegium to discuss the city of Messene's request for their help. Most council members did not want to attack the Aetolians, but Aratus was able to persuade them. He began to raise an army near Megalopolis, with the aim of trapping the Aetolians as they returned to their ships to sail home. But the Aetolian commander was able to evade the threat. It seemed there would be no decisive confrontation, until the Achaean commanders made a crucial mistake and Aratus sent a cavalry unit against the Aetolians:

The Achaean commanders, when they became aware of the approach of the Aetolians, mismanaged matters to such an extent that it was impossible for anyone to have acted more stupidly.

— Polybius, Histories, 4, 11, 1

The cavalry had to fight on rough terrain, where the Aetolians were greatly superior. Aratus then abandoned his favourable position to go to his cavalry's aid. The rest of the Aetolian force seized the advantage, charging from high ground to rout the Achaeans. After the battle, the Aetolians continued pillaging, and also raided Sicyon. They returned to Aetolia via the Isthmus of Corinth, adding insult to the injury of the Achaeans' failure to protect their own.

As both sides were then trying to find new allies, the Achaean League turned again to Macedon. But the new Macedonian king, Philip V, was not keen on war with the Aetolians. Ultimately, the Achaeans did convince Philip, and Boeotia, Acarnania, and Epirus also joined the alliance. The Aetolians allied with Sparta and Elis, and in 219 BC again invaded Achaean League territory. This invasion attempt was put down near Aegeira, but it was not a decisive defeat.

In the meantime, Philip was preparing his army in Macedon. He won several victories in 218 BC, but his army mutinied and he returned to Macedon for the winter. Philip was assisted by Aratus and several other advisors, of whom Apelles was the most important. Aratus had become very influential, and is considered to have been a true friend of the king. Apelles, in contrast, remained resolutely Macedonian, still wanting to incorporate Achaea into the Kingdom of Macedon. Apelles began to oppose the Achaeans in the allied army, for example by demoting several Achaean officers. He also opposed Aratus by supporting his opponent, Eperatus, in the election of a new strategos. He tried, and failed, to impeach Aratus by ruse. The relationship between Apelles and the Macedonian king appears to have worsened as a result, and Aratus became Philip's most important advisor. Aratus quickly gained a reputation for his skill, but this increased the other officers’ envy. They began to insult him openly during their banquets, even throwing stones. The king was furious, and ordered those responsible put to death.

After Macedon's intervention in the war, the Aetolians faced more difficulties on all fronts. They continued their pillaging, but were frequently ambushed. Ultimately they sued for peace, concluded in 217 BC.

== Death ==
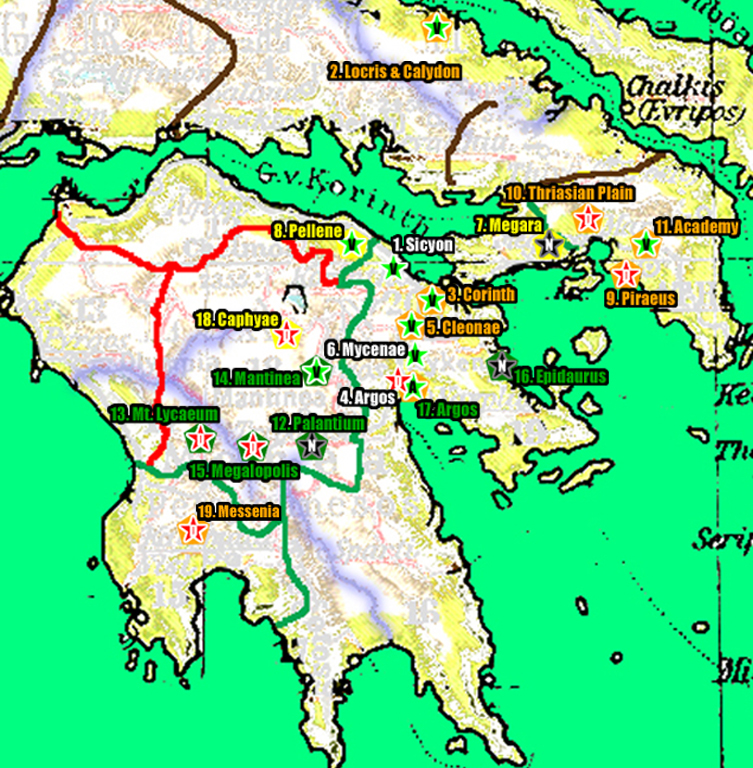
Map with the most important events in Aratus' life. Green star: victory Red star: defeat Black star: retreat

After the Social War, Philip caused a civil war in Messene, and possibly kept Aratus out of the matter deliberately. Unhappy, Aratus ordered the king to suppress the unrest. Philip was angry, but taken aback at his vehemence, and accepted the rebuke.

Meanwhile, the First Macedonian War between Macedon and Rome had erupted. In 214 BC, the Romans defeated Philip near the town of Oricum in Illyria. The same year, Philip returned to Messene, which he attacked for reasons that remain unclear. Aratus had already given his opinion of Philip's deeds near Messene, and did so again, (Note: Macedon gaining territory in the Peloponnese was unfavourable to the Achaean League, which wished to remain independent. The relationship between Aratus and Philip may also have worsened for personal reasons, as the king had reportedly seduced Aratus' daughter-in-law.) also refusing to support Philip's campaigns in Illyria.

Aratus's health deteriorated rapidly during this period, and he died in 213 BC. As tensions had been high between the king and the strategos, there were inevitable rumours of foul play. According to Plutarch, Philip had Aratus poisoned. He reports that Aratus knew what was happening, but could only confide this information to his manservant:

Such, my dear Cephalo, said Aratus, are the wages of royal friendship.

— Plutarch, Parallel Lives, Life of Aratus, 52.3

According to modern scholarship, this dramatic version of events, fitting the topos of the ungrateful prince, is unlikely. Philip had no interest in an unstable Achaea. Aratus remained useful, despite having asked some difficult questions of Philip in the recent past, and it is difficult to imagine Philip wanting him eliminated. Had there been substance to the rumours, much public comment on the great man's murder by the king of Macedon would be expected.

By special permission of the Oracle of Delphi, Aratus was the first person to be buried within the city walls of Sicyon as 'founder and saviour of the city'.

== Personality and reception ==
Aratus was elected strategos of the Achaean League seventeen times. Under his leadership the Achaean League became a major player in Greece, thanks principally to his military victories rather to any great skill as a tactician. Reportedly, his nerves would get the better of him at critical moments during battle. Plutarch reports that Aratus was a great politician, but that his capacities did not extend to the battlefield, saying: "the general of the Achaeans always had cramps in the bowels when a battle was imminent". But it seems Aratus was a master of the surprise attack, although details of these battles remain obscure.

What Aratus lacked as a tactician, he made up for as a politician. He was very good at compromise, as when he surrendered the hard-earned Acrocorinth to Macedon when he needed Macedon's help against Sparta. He could also display great patience. When he brought Sicyon into the Achaean League, for example, Aratus knew that he was too young to be elected strategos. This did not stop him from ultimately achieving that goal.

Aratus became the most important person within the Achaean League, but it grew progressively more difficult for him to get his way as a succession of other mighty city-states joined. Although it is unlikely that Aratus was poisoned, his death was certainly linked with the final stage of Philip's transition from beloved young prince to what Plutarch described as an impious despot richly deserving of downfall.

Aratus wrote his memoirs, now lost, though they are mentioned by both Polybius and Plutarch. Polybius uses them as a source, and states that he is covering Aratus "quite summarily, as he published a truthful and clearly written memoir of his career". Plutarch mentions that "he is said to have been a more ornate speaker than some think who judge from the Commentaries which he left; these were a bye-work, and were composed in haste, off-hand, and in the words that first occurred to him in the heat of contest." The information concerning Aratus is therefore to be read through a critical filter, allowing for the possibility that he may have wanted to attenuate his own mistakes by blaming others, or that he glorified his own victories.

== Sources ==
=== Ancient sources ===
- Plutarch, Parallel Lives, Life of Aratus
- Polybius, Histories

=== Literature ===
- Roberts, Mike; Bennett, Bob (2012). Twilight of the Hellenistic World. South Yorkshire: Pen & Sword Military. ISBN 9781848841369.
- Walbank, Frank William (1933). Aratos of Sicyon. Cambridge: Cambridge University Press. ISBN 9780598834324.

Preceded by Margos	Strategos of the Achaean League; 245–244 BC	Succeeded by Dioedas?
Preceded by Dioedas?	Strategos of the Achaean League; 243–242 BC	Succeeded by Aegialeas
Preceded by Aegialeas	Strategos of the Achaean League; 241–240 BC	Succeeded by ?
Preceded by ?	Strategos of the Achaean League; 239–238 BC	Succeeded by ?
Preceded by ?	Strategos of the Achaean League; 237–236 BC	Succeeded by Dioedas?
Preceded by Dioedas?	Strategos of the Achaean League; 235–234 BC	Succeeded by Lydiades of Megalopolis
Preceded by Lydiades of Megalopolis	Strategos of the Achaean League; 233–232 BC	Succeeded by Lydiades of Megalopolis
Preceded by Lydiades of Megalopolis	Strategos of the Achaean League; 231–230 BC	Succeeded by Lydiades of Megalopolis
Preceded by Lydiades of Megalopolis	Strategos of the Achaean League; 229–228 BC	Succeeded by Aristomachus of Argos
Preceded by Aristomachus of Argos	Strategos of the Achaean League; 227–226 BC	Succeeded by Hyperuatas
Vacant ad hoc position	Strategos autokrator of the Achaean League; 225–222 BC	Vacant ad hoc position
Preceded by Timoxenos	Strategos of the Achaean League; 224–223 BC	Succeeded by Timoxenos?
Preceded by Timoxenos?	Strategos of the Achaean League; 222–221 BC	Succeeded by Timoxenos
Preceded by Timoxenos	Strategos of the Achaean League; 220–219 BC	Succeeded by Aratus the Younger
Preceded by Epiratos	Strategos of the Achaean League; 217–216 BC	Succeeded by Timoxenos
Preceded by Timoxenos	Strategos of the Achaean League; 215–214 BC	Succeeded by ?
Preceded by ?	Strategos of the Achaean League; 213 BC	Succeeded by Cycliadas?
