= Pseudo-Philip =

Pseudo-Philip may refer to:

- Andriscus (149–148 BC), called Pseudo-Philip, rebel king of Macedonia
- Pseudo-Perseus (143 BC), also called Pseudo-Philip, rebel king of Macedonia
- Pseudo-Philip (112/111 BC), rebel king of Macedonia
