= Niese =

Niese is a surname, and may refer to:

- Benedikt Niese (1849–1910), German classical scholar
- Charlotte Niese (1854–1935), German writer, poet and teacher
- Danielle de Niese (born 1979), Australian-born soprano
- Hansi Niese (Johanna Niese, 1875–1934), Austrian actress
- Jon Niese (born 1986), American baseball player

== See also ==
- Niese (Emmer), river in Germany
