= Fourth Macedonian War =

War between Rome and Macedonia, 150–148 BC

- Part of Macedonian Wars
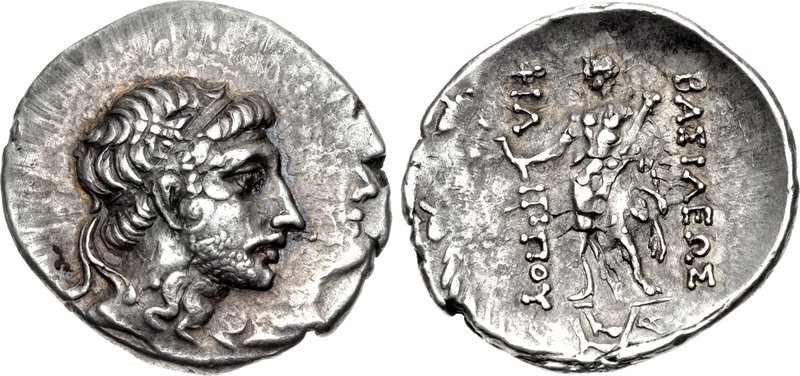
- Drachm of Andriscus, the Macedonian pretender, overstruck on a Roman denarius, perhaps taken as booty after Andriscus' initial victory
Date	150–148 BC
Location	Macedon and Thessaly
Result	Roman victory
Territorial changes	Roman annexation of Macedon

Belligerents
Roman Republic; Attalid kingdom Achaean League	Macedon; Thracian allies Carthage (Note: Although Carthage was unable to send any material aid to Andriscus during the war, an alliance is attested to.)

Commanders and leaders
P. Cornelius Scipio Nasica; Publius Juventius Thalna †; Quintus Caecilius Metellus	Andriscus; Teres III; Barsabas; Pseudo-Alexander

The Fourth Macedonian War (150–148 BC) was fought between Macedon, led by the pretender Andriscus, and the Roman Republic. It was the last of the Macedonian Wars, and was the last war to seriously threaten Roman control of Greece until the First Mithridatic War sixty years later.

The last Macedonian king of the Antigonid dynasty, Perseus, had been defeated and dethroned by the Romans in the Third Macedonian War in 168 BC. In the aftermath of the war, Rome took indirect control of the region through a system of client states, and imposed harsh terms to prevent Macedon from becoming a powerful state again. This system was successful in maintaining Roman hegemony for nearly two decades, but broke down when Andriscus, a Greek who bore a resemblance to Perseus, claimed to be the former king's son and re-established the Macedonian Kingdom with Thracian troops.

Andriscus was initially successful, defeating Roman clients and a Roman army sent to stop him, and conquering much of Thessaly. However, he was eventually defeated by another Roman army under Quintus Caecilius Metellus at the Second Battle of Pydna in 148 BC, severely weakening his position; he was subsequently pursued and eventually betrayed to the Romans. After settling a few subsequent minor rebellions, Rome took direct control of Macedon, making it a Roman province.

== Background ==
Tensions between the Roman Republic and Macedon had first begun in 215 BC, when Philip V of Macedon allied himself with Rome's rival, Carthage, and declared war on Rome, sparking the First Macedonian War, an indecisive sideshow of the larger Second Punic War between Rome and Carthage. Soon after the end of the war with Carthage, a victorious Rome received multiple requests for assistance from a number of Greek polities and city-states which were afraid of Philip's ambition. Although war-weary from the recent Punic War, Rome agreed, and when Philip refused to accept their terms, they declared war on and defeated him in the Second Macedonian War of 200-197 BC, in which Philip was stripped of much territory and prestige, and forced to comply with Rome's demands. In the aftermath of this conflict, tensions developed between Rome and the Seleucid Empire, whose ambitious monarch, Antiochus III the Great, aimed to attain hegemony over Greece. Encouraged by the Aetolian League, Antiochus went to war with Rome in 192 BC, sparking the Roman-Seleucid War; it ended in a resounding Roman victory — Antiochus lost all his territory in Asia Minor and had to disband his fleet, pay a massive war indemnity and promise not to cross the Taurus Mountains, effectively relegating the Seleucids to an Asiatic power and ending their influence in Greece. Macedon regained some territory and influence on account of their cooperation with the Romans in this conflict, but high-handed Roman actions and Macedonian revanchism continued to stoke resentment in Philip.

Macedonian power continued to grow for the rest of Philip's reign, and this was continued by his talented son and successor, Perseus. Although Rome formally reaffirmed "friendship" with him, tensions continued to grow on account of reviving Macedonian power, Perseus' growing popularity with the Greeks and his successful diplomacy in the Greek world, in which he revived Macedonian influence and strengthened its position as a leading power once again. A tenuous peace continued until Eumenes II of Pergamon, a staunch Roman ally and Perseus' arch-rival, went to Rome in 172 BC and persuaded them that Perseus was a threat to Rome and the Greeks, and exhorted them to break his power. Finally, as Eumenes was returning to Pergamon, an assassination attempt on him, for which Perseus was blamed, resolved Rome in favour of war. The ensuing Third Macedonian War of 171-168 BC was hard-fought, but ended in a complete Roman victory and Perseus' surrender and imprisonment, establishing Rome's position as the sole hegemonic power in the Greek world.

The Greek world was harshly treated in the aftermath of the Roman victory; allies of Perseus were brutally repressed, while those suspected to have sympathized with Perseus became pariahs in the new Roman-dominated order. Rome took unprecedented measures to ensure that a revival of Macedonian power would be impossible — the ancient Macedonian monarchy was abolished and Perseus was exiled to an Italian city. Knowing that occupying Macedon would require military presence against barbarian tribes on Macedon's northern frontier, Rome decided against making it a province; instead, Macedon was broken up into four client republics, or merides, that paid tribute to Rome, with trade regulations and restrictions on interaction between the republics, as well as being forbidden to work Macedon's rich mines freely, and limiting them to possessing only such military forces as were necessary to deal with barbarian tribes to the north. (Note: These republics were called merides on account of some similarities they shared with the old administrative districts of Macedon, which were also called merides. However, the Romans imposed far more restrictions and demarcations between the republics, while the old merides had simply been administrative divisions.) Most of the former ruling elite was deported to Rome. Macedon also suffered from impoverishment, due to the fiscal restrictions imposed on it and the looting of treasuries by victorious Roman troops at the end of the Third Macedonian War in 168 BC. This, along with the effective destruction of the old social order, created great resentment among many sections of the populace.

However, Rome withdrew all its troops in 167 BC; thereafter, it left the Macedonian merides alone in their internal administration, not intervening even when appeals were made to it to resolve serious crises like a massacre of Macedonian officials in 163 BC. It has been suggested that Rome was seeking to satisfy the Macedonians with local autonomy, so that they would forget any sort of "national" identity; however, a general longing for monarchy persisted in Macedon, as the people had not yet adapted to democratic institutions, though a significant class of pro-Roman Macedonian republicans did develop, including those who had been persecuted by the old Antigonid monarchy. Some regulations were relaxed; for instance, the Macedonians were allowed to use their mines again from 158 BC, but resentment continued, including over those restrictions that remained, as well as the division of Macedon, leaving the situation ripe for the rise of pretenders to the old Antigonid throne.

== Andriscus claims the throne ==
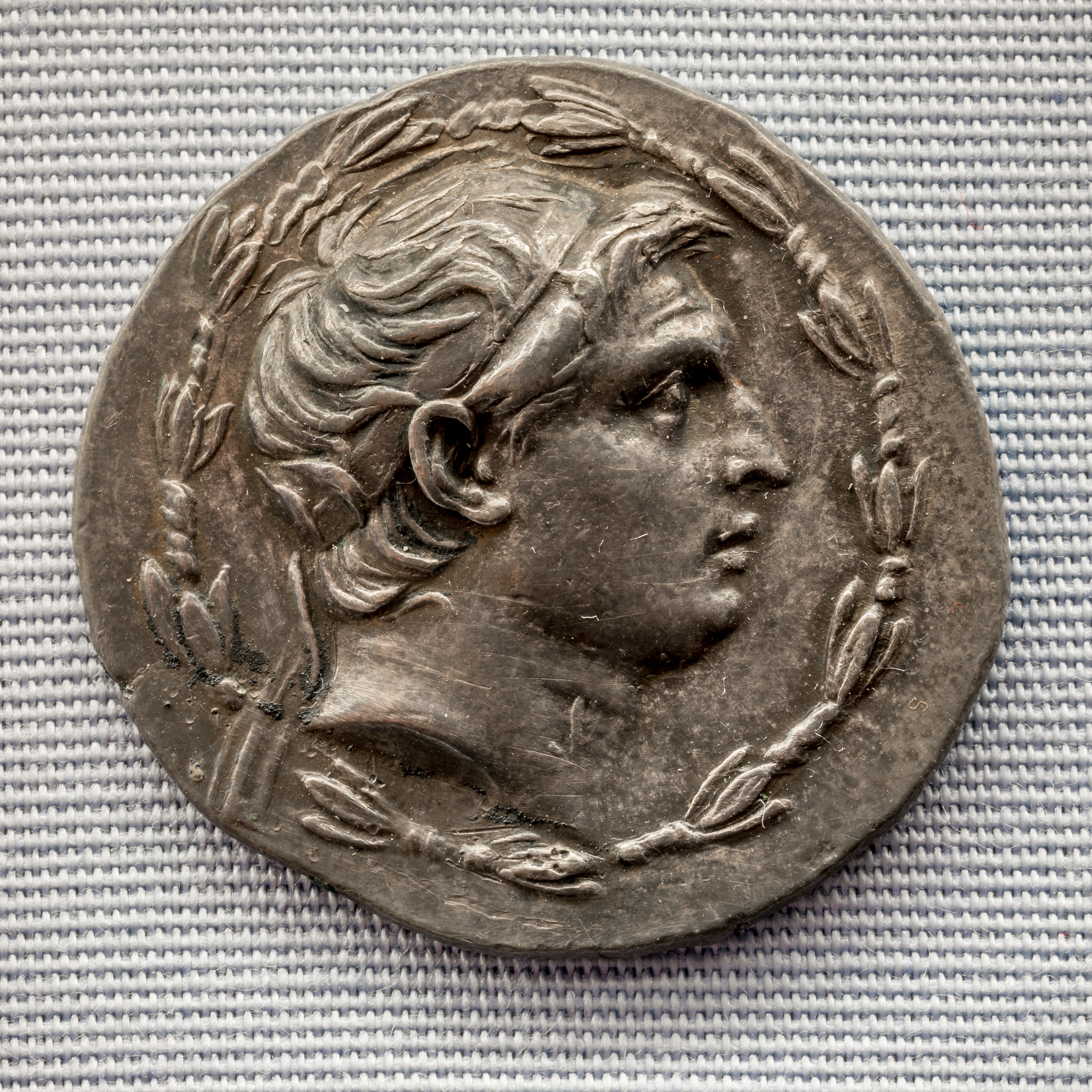
Demetrius I of Syria, who refused military aid to the pretender and had him sent to Rome

Around 154/153 BC, a Greek named Andriscus, who bore a resemblance to the Antigonids, began claiming that he was Philip, a now-obscure son of Perseus, and had been reared in secrecy by a foster family. (Note: Helliesen argues that he claimed to be an illegitimate son of Perseus by a concubine, rather than Philip.) The origins of this youth are unclear; ancient sources generally agree that he was a man of low origins, and that he hailed from Adramyttium in Aeolis in northwestern Asia Minor. He entered Macedonia in force to claim "his" throne, but was repulsed, presumably by the combined forces of three of the four client republics (the third republic had been forbidden from raising troops by the settlement of 167 BC).

At some point after this failure, he travelled to Syria and enlisted as a mercenary of the Seleucid monarch, Demetrius I Soter, and now began making his claims there. News of his claims spread, and after gaining enough notability, he appealed to Demetrius to help him regain his throne. Despite riotous support for him from the population of the Seleucid capital, Antioch, Demetrius refused to help him, and instead arrested him and had him shipped to Rome. (Note: This popular sympathy was partly because large swathes of the urban population in the Seleucid realm were of Macedonian descent, due to the Seleucid policy of inviting settlers from Greece and Macedon to Hellenize their realm. This population was significantly anti-Roman, as they still sympathized with their original homeland and resented its subjugation by Rome. Besides this, there appear to have been many Macedonian émigrés who fled Macedon during the fall of Macedon and strongly hated Rome.) The senate, however, remained complacent; although he was brought before the senate, he was simply exiled to an Italian city. He soon managed to escape from Italy and fled back to the Greek world, but the Romans remained unperturbed; they did not take him seriously.

He travelled to Miletus, where he tried to advance his claims further, attracting significant attention. Diodorus writes that when the leaders of Miletus learned about this, they arrested him and sought advice from visiting Roman envoys on what to do with him; the envoys were contemptuous of the pretender and told the Milesians that he was safe to release. After his release, he continued to try to achieve his aim of becoming king of Macedon. He travelled to Pergamon to meet with Callippa, a former concubine of Perseus, who gave him money and royal regalia. From there he went on to Byzantium, where he was received favourably and obtaining a significant following and a number of sympathizers. Helliesen proposes that the following that Andriscus built up in this period derived from Macedonians who had fled to Attalid territory after the Third Macedonian War and had been settled in garrisons in western Lydia.

Andriscus then travelled to Thrace, where he found allies and sympathy, especially from the Odrysian king Teres III, who was related to the Antigonids by marriage. Teres held a coronation ceremony for Andriscus, crowning him with a diadem, gave him a hundred troops, and introduced him to other Thracian leaders, including one Barsabas, who agreed to accompany him on his campaign to reclaim the Macedonian throne. He was also aided by some forces of Macedonian origin that Rubinsohn refers to as "émigré rabble".

== Course of the war ==
=== Andriscus' conquest of Macedon ===
With this force, Andriscus invaded Macedonia in the spring of 149 BC. Initially, he failed to inspire much popular support for himself among the Macedonian populace, emboldening the Roman client republics in Macedon, and making the Roman Senate complacent about the risk posed by the pretender. There are indications that his first attempts to conquer Macedon were failures; he rallied his resources and tried again, meeting the forces of one of the republics in a battle on the banks of the Strymon river, defeating them soundly and conquering all of Macedonia west of the Strymon, including the old royal capital of Pella where took up residence, around the summer of 149 BC. At this point, he assumed the regnal name Philip. The Macedonian merides to the west continued to resist him, but were defeated in another battle on the west bank of the Strymon, after which the Macedonians seem to have accepted him as king.

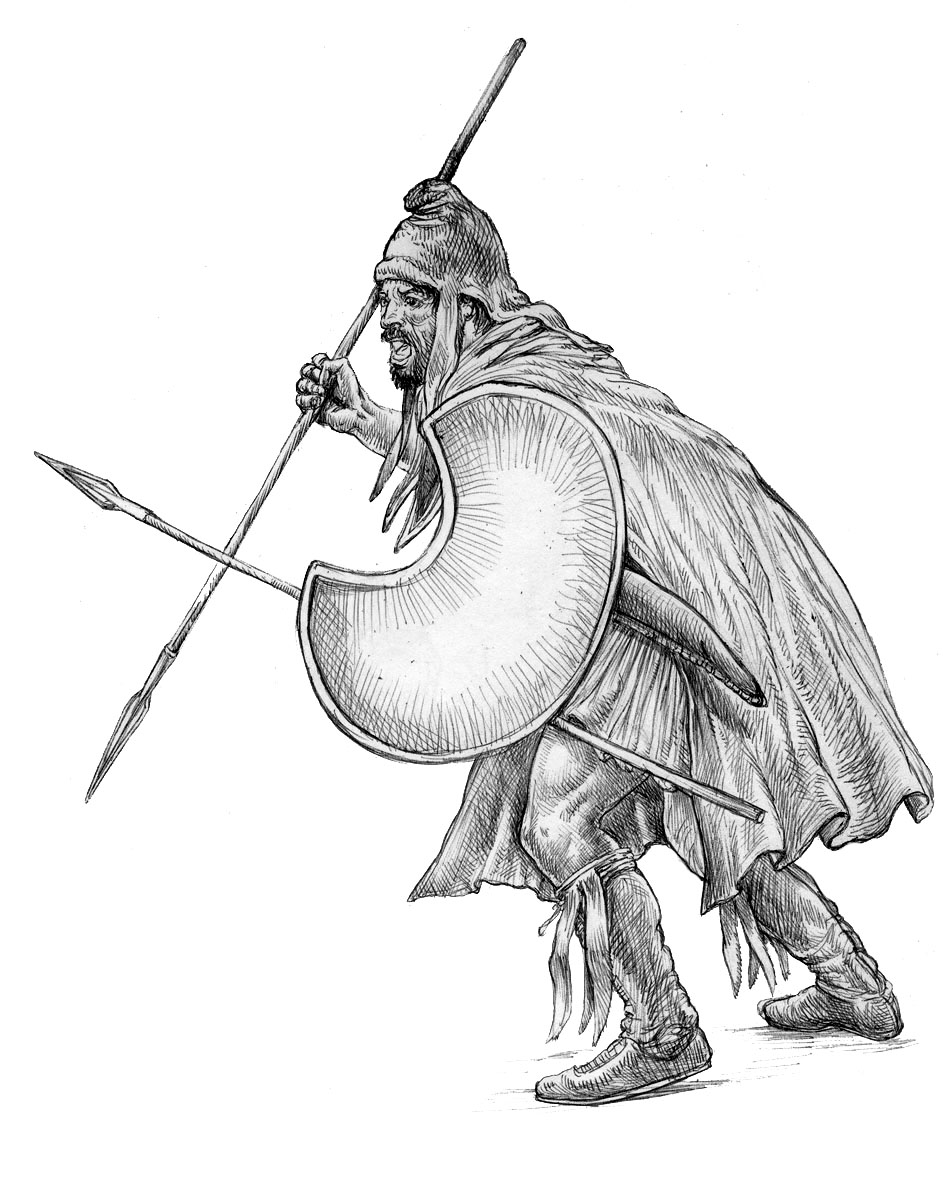
Thracian peltast, 5th-4th century BC. Thracian troops formed a significant component of Andriscus' army, and the bulk of his initial force

His victories gained him the loyalty of the Macedonians; the people longed for monarchy and were willing to accept a ruler, and were eager to get rid of the artificial divisions and factional strife of the client republics. On the other hand, the neighbouring Greeks, including the historian Polybius, were taken by surprise; Polybius writes in astonishment of how the pretender who had "dropped from the skies" and, in his view, was a tyrant, could be accepted, let alone enthusiastically, by the Macedonians. Arthur M. Eckstein puts this view down to the fact that Polybius and the Greeks were part of a deep-rooted republican society, and could not comprehend the Macedonian longing for a hallowed monarchical past. Andriscus now attacked Thessaly; the Thessalian League appealed to the Achaean League for aid, knowing that any Roman involvement would be slow to come. They and the remnants of the pro-Roman Macedonian forces resisted him for some time, until Rome finally decided to send a legate, Scipio Nasica Corculum, to assess the situation.

=== Roman involvement ===
Scipio was sent with the purpose of negotiating a peaceful settlement; Gruen remarks that the fact that Rome believed in the possibility of a peaceful settlement at this stage shows that they were either out of touch with the situation or were not really committed to the settlement they had drawn up in the aftermath of the Third Macedonian War. It has been suggested that there is a possibility that he was sent before news of Andriscus' campaigns became widely known, and that he was simply sent to dissuade any Greek sympathy for Carthage, which Rome was planning to attack. Whatever the case, Scipio's attempts at diplomacy failed, probably because the Romans were unwilling to accept Andriscus' demand to be recognized as king of a unified Macedon. Instead, Scipio resorted to military action, and began to rally the forces of Thessalians and Achaeans that had already been fighting. With them, he managed to temporarily halt Andriscus' advance. Still, the Roman commander informed the Senate that direct military intervention would be needed to stop the pretender, as the situation was getting dire, with Andriscus already having conquered significant parts of Thessaly.

== Thalna's defeat ==
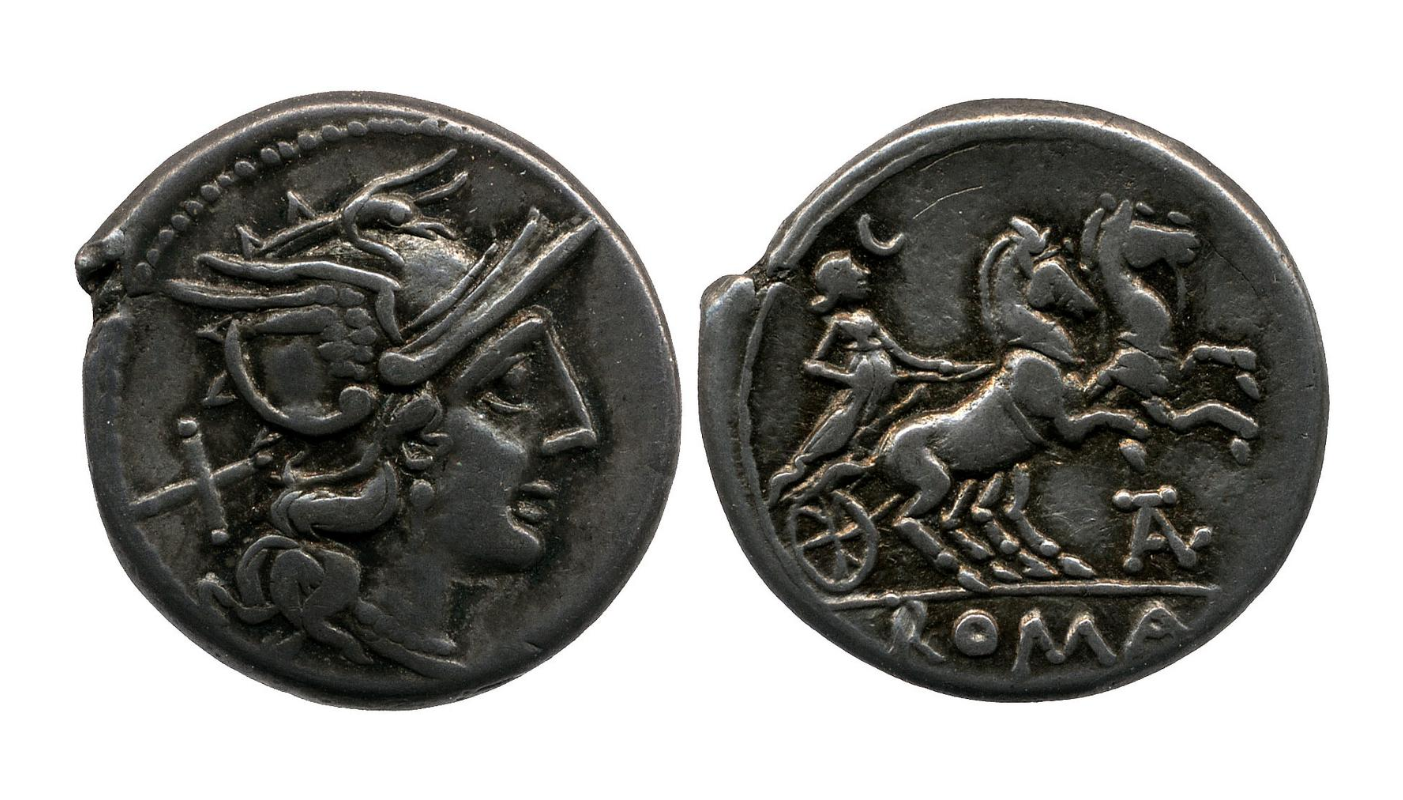
Denarius, possibly minted by Publius Juventius Thalna c. 179–170 BC

In response to Scipio's report, the Senate appointed a praetor, Publius Juventius Thalna, to command a legion and settle the situation with military force. Thalna was probably reinforced by Greek contingents, and spent two or three months stabilizing the situation. However he seems to have underestimated Andriscus, not understanding that Andriscus' army had swelled dramatically since his enthronement, including contingents of both Macedonians and Thracians. Thalna's attempt to invade Macedonia via Thessaly was intercepted by Andriscus at an unspecified location near the borders of Macedon in late 149 or early 148 BC; details of the engagement are scarce, but Thalna was killed and his army almost annihilated, with the survivors escaping under the cover of night. It was the worst defeat Rome had suffered so far in their campaigns against Hellenistic powers, and had massive psychological impact in both Greece and Rome.

Domestically, Andriscus' popularity was greatly increased, and he launched another invasion of Thessaly, successfully devastating and conquering most of it. Foreign interest in him increased; Carthage, which was now at war with Rome in the Third Punic War, agreed to an alliance with him and promised him money and ships. On the other hand, Attalus II Philadelphus of Pergamon remained a staunch Roman ally; he had no intention of seeing a strong and revived Macedonia as a neighbour. The battle also underlined the fact that the Macedonians were committed to their newly-revived monarchy, however weak their king's claim.

At the same time, the Macedonian victory also meant the end of any hopes of negotiated peace with Rome. The Romans could not take such a defeat lying down, and resolved to crush Macedonia as a power once and for all. Fears of Roman reprisal prompted defections in Macedon; Andriscus began to take harsh and cruel measures against any pro-Roman elements, conducting acts of terrorism and repression against them.

== Metellus' campaign ==
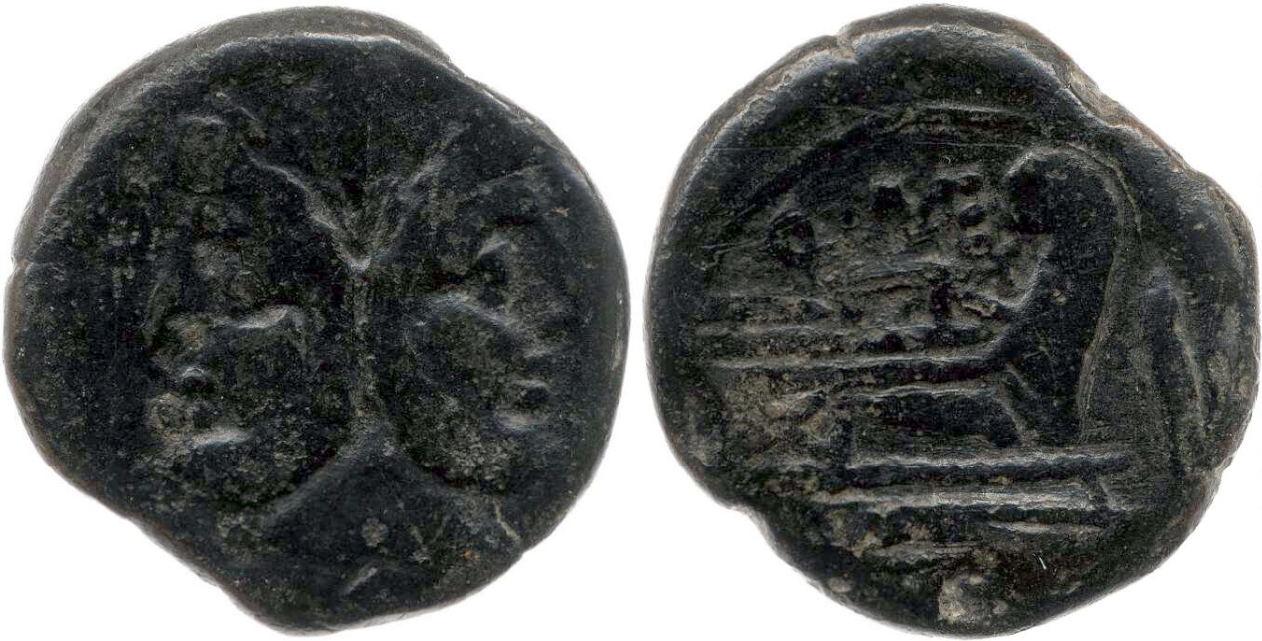
As minted by Q. Caecilius Metellus, c. 155–149 BC

Rome soon began preparing a full consular army of two legions to fight in Macedon; despite the difficulties associated with raising such a force when they already had many legions serving in other theatres of war, the Senate did not wish to take any risks in the aftermath of Thalna's crushing defeat, and strongly desired to avoid any possibility of military collaboration between Macedon and Carthage. Both Roman consuls for the year were already engaged in other theatres of war; therefore, the Senate entrusted the campaign one of the year's praetors, Quintus Caecilius Metellus, granting him proconsular powers. (Note: Derow writes that Metellus had connections in the region, as his father, another Quintus Caecilius Metellus, had been an ambassador to Philip V's court in 185 BC.)

Arriving in Greece in the summer of 148 BC, Metellus received the assistance of the fleet of Attalus II, and made an advance along the Thessalian coast, while the Pergamene fleet threatened the coastal districts of northern Macedonia; Amphipolis seems to have passed out of Andriscus' control by this stage. To protect himself from both offensives, and to prevent the loss of Macedon's seaboard, the king took up a defensive position at Pydna, where the Roman commander engaged him in battle.

=== Second Battle of Pydna ===
Not many details survive about the battle, or the exact numbers of troops involved. The first clash was a cavalry skirmish, in which Andriscus' forces had the upper hand, defeating units of Roman cavalry. Before or around the time of this skirmish, a Macedonian cavalry commander named Telestes defected with a significant portion of the Macedonian cavalry.

After this, Andriscus sent away some of his forces to continue his campaign in Thessaly, possibly due to supply issues or to threaten the Roman rear, or due to overconfidence. Metellus seized this opportunity to attack in full strength, possibly with the assistance of traitors in Andriscus' force; his forces soon routed both forces of Macedonians; Andriscus fled the battle.

== End of the war ==
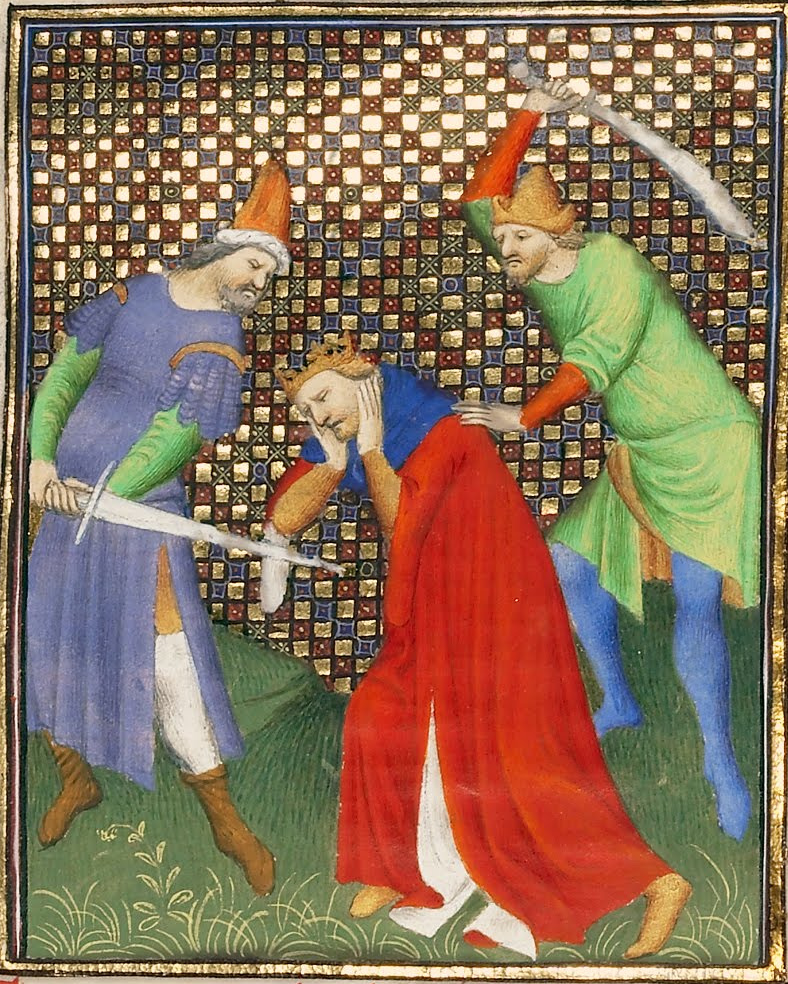
Death of the "false Philip" in a 15th-century miniature.

The battle shattered Andriscus' army and broke the Macedonian war effort. He fled to Thrace and began raising another army there, but Metellus pursued him swiftly, forcing Andriscus into a new battle before his raw levies were fully prepared. (Note: The fact that he chose to flee to Thrace, rather than begin a guerrilla war in the mountain refuges of Macedon, has been used to suggest that his most loyal support was from Thracians, not Macedonians. Niese writes that he had lost much of his support after his victory over Thalna due to his tyranny, which was why one battle was enough to make him lose control of Macedon.) This engagement was an easy victory for the Romans; as soon as the Macedonian front ranks were broken, the rest of the army fled in panic. Andriscus himself fled to the Thracian princeling Byzes, but Metellus managed to persuade the latter to become a Roman ally and hand Andriscus over, concluding the campaign.

However, Macedon was not fully pacified yet. Another uprising, probably with Thracian support, arose under the leadership of a certain Alexander, who now declared himself to be a son of Perseus and occupied the basin of the Nestus River. However, he was quickly defeated by Metellus and forced to flee into Dardania. By the end of 147 BC, Metellus had largely pacified the country and restored order. This was not the end of Macedonian rebellions against Rome; another pretender would later cause a crisis in 143-142 BC, raising an army of 16,000 men before being defeated and killed by the quaestor Lucius Tremellius; apart from this, border crises with the Thracians, which had been an issue for previous Macedonian governments as well, continued.

Metellus imposed penalties on the Macedonians, as well as on the Byzantines, who had earlier been sympathetic to Andriscus. He took significant booty, including some of the spoils taken by Alexander the Great at the Battle of the Granicus, and many valuable works of art. After settling subsequent affairs in Greece and Macedon, the victorious praetor later returned to Rome in 146 BC, where he was given the agnomen Macedonicus and granted a triumph. Andriscus was paraded in this triumph, and subsequently executed.

== Roman reorganization of Macedon ==
The Senate realized that the settlement of 168 BC could no longer sustain itself; the extent of support that Andriscus' uprising had won among the Macedonians demonstrated both the fragility of indirect control and the need for a thorough reorganization of Macedonia. It is likely that a senatorial legation was sent to Macedon, probably soon after Metellus' victory, and, together with Metellus, made administrative changes to governance in Macedon, transferring significant functions to a Roman praetor. From this point onwards, a legion and a praetor were permanently stationed in Macedon; this was the first time Roman troops were permanently based east of the Adriatic Sea. Macedon was unified into a single administrative unit as the Provincia Macedonia; the new province included not only Macedon, but also parts of southern Illyria, as well as Epirus and Thessaly. This received mixed reactions; on one hand, the people welcomed the reunification of Macedon; on the other hand, they resented their loss of freedom and the harsher rule of the Romans. Many praetors would engage in corruption and extortion; besides, they were not as effective as previous administrations in protecting the region from barbarian raids.

The exact nature and chronology of the provincialization is a matter of debate. It is known that a new provincial era, the "Macedonian Era", was proclaimed in 148 BC, but it is disputed as to whether this was to signify the formation of the province or Metellus' victory. Doubts have been expressed as to whether Metellus could have had the time to organize Macedonia into a province, and it has instead been suggested that it was one of the consuls of 146 BC, Lucius Mummius, who reorganized Macedon with the help of a decemviral commission while settling the affairs of Greece. Gruen and Eckstein doubt whether Macedon ever formally became a province, pointing out that the Macedonian merides continued to exist well into the early principate. In their view, what changed after the Fourth Macedonian war was that from then on, a Roman praetor and his legion were permanently stationed in Macedonia; naturally, they gradually took on more administrative and bureaucratic roles, leading to an informal provincialization. Still, the presence of Roman officials after 148 BC was a sudden and clear change, and signified the loss of Macedonian and Illyrian freedom.

== Aftermath ==
Soon afterwards, the Achaean League in 146 BC mobilized for a new war against the Roman Republic. This is known as the Achaean War, and was noted for its short duration and its timing right after the fall of Macedonia. Until this time, Rome had only campaigned in Greece in order to fight Macedonian forces, allies or clients. The Achaean leaders almost certainly knew that this declaration of war against Rome was hopeless, as Rome had triumphed against far stronger and larger opponents, the Roman legion having proved its supremacy over the Macedonian phalanx.

Polybius blames the demagogues of the cities of the league for inspiring the population into a suicidal war. Panhellenic rhetoric and the idea of triumphing against superior odds motivated the league into this rash decision. The Achaean League was swiftly defeated, and, as an object lesson, Rome utterly destroyed the city of Corinth in 146 BC, the same year that Carthage was destroyed. After nearly a century of constant crisis management in the Greek world, which always led back to internal instability and war when Rome pulled out, the Senate decided to establish the Roman province of Macedonia, covering all of mainland Greece and establishing a permanent Roman presence in the region, though a few territories like Athens and Sparta retained self-government and partial autonomy. More than a century later, Augustus would establish Achaea as a separate province.

== See also ==
- History of Macedonia (ancient kingdom)

== Sources ==
=== Primary sources ===
- Diodorus Siculus, Bibliotheca Historica, Book 32
- Polybius, The Histories, Book 37
- Livy, Ab Urbe Condita Libri, Book XLV and Periochae 46-50
- Velleius Paterculus, Roman history, Book I
- Cassius Dio, Roman History, Book 21
- Florus, Epitome, Book 1;

=== Secondary sources ===
- Burton, Paul (2017). Rome and the Third Macedonian War. Cambridge: Cambridge University Press. ISBN 9781107104440.
- Crawford, Michael (1974). Roman republican coinage. Cambridge: Cambridge University Press. ISBN 9780521074926.
- Derow, Peter (1989). "Rome, the fall of Macedon and the sack of Corinth". In Astin, A. E.; Walbank, F. W.; Frederiksen, M. W.; Ogilvie, R. M. (eds.). The Cambridge ancient history. Vol. 8, Rome and the Mediterranean to 133 B.C. (2nd ed.). Cambridge: Cambridge University Press. pp. 290–323. ISBN 9781139054362.
- Eckstein, Arthur M. (2010). "Macedonia and Rome, 221–146 BC". In Roisman, Joseph; Worthington, Ian (eds.). A Companion to Ancient Macedonia. Oxford: Wiley-Blackwell. pp. 225–250. ISBN 978-1-4051-7936-2.
- Gruen, Erich S. (1984). The Hellenistic world and the coming of Rome. Berkeley: University of California Press. pp. 431–436. ISBN 9780520045699.
- Hause, Steven C.; Maltby, William S. (2004). Western civilization: a history of European society. Thomson Wadsworth. ISBN 978-0-534-62164-3. "The Greco-Macedonian Elite. The Seleucids respected the cultural and religious sensibilities of their subjects but preferred to rely on Greek or Macedonian soldiers and administrators for the day-to-day business of governing. The Greek population of the cities, reinforced until the second century BC by immigration from Greece, formed a dominant, although not especially cohesive, elite."
- Helliesen, Jean M. (1986). "Andriscus and the Revolt of the Macedonians, 149-148 BC". Ancient Macedonia IV: Papers Read at the Fourth International Symposium held in Thessaloniki, September 21-25, 1983. Thessaloniki: Institute for Balkan Studies. pp. 307–314.
- Hoover, Oliver D. (2000). "A Dedication to Aphrodite Epekoos for Demetrius I Soter and His Family". Zeitschrift für Papyrologie und Epigraphik. 131: 106–110. JSTOR 20190661.
- Hoover, Oliver D. (2016). "Handbook of Coins of Macedon and Its Neighbors. Part I: Macedon, Illyria, and Epeiros, Sixth to First Centuries BC". The Handbook of Greek Coinage Series. Vol. 3. Lancaster/London: Classical Numismatic Group. ISBN 9780989825412.
- MacKay, Pierre A. (1968). "Macedonian Tetradrachms of 148-147 B.C.". Museum Notes (American Numismatic Society). 14: 15–40. JSTOR 43573445.
- Morgan, M. Gwyn (1969). "Metellus Macedonicus and the Province Macedonia". Historia: Zeitschrift für Alte Geschichte. 18 (4): 422–446. JSTOR 4435094.
- Morstein-Marx, Robert (1995). Hegemony to empire : the development of the Roman Imperium in the East from 148 to 62 B.C. Berkeley: University of California Press. pp. 11–41. ISBN 9780520080751.
- Niese, Benedict (1903). Geschichte der griechischen und makedonischen Staaten seit der Schlacht bei Chaeronea (in German). Gotha F.A. Perthes.
- Rubinsohn, W. Z. (1988). "Macedonian Resistance to Roman Occupation in the Second Half of the Second Century BC". In Yuge, Toru; Doi, Masaoki (eds.). Forms of control and subordination in antiquity. Tokyo: Society for Studies on Resistance Movements in Antiquity. pp. 141–158. ISBN 9789004083493.
- Vanderspoel, John (2010). "Provincia Macedonia". In Roisman, Joseph; Worthington, Ian (eds.). A Companion to Ancient Macedonia. Oxford: Wiley-Blackwell. pp. 251–276. ISBN 978-1-4051-7936-2.
- Vanderspoel, J. (2015). "Rome's apparent disinterest in Macedonia 168-148 B.C.". In Howe, Timothy; Garvin, Edward; Wrightson, Graham (eds.). Greece, Macedon and Persia : studies in social, political and military history in honour of Waldemar Heckel (Hardcover ed.). Philadelphia. pp. 198–206. ISBN 9781782979234.
- Victor, Royce M. (2010). Colonial education and class formation in early Judaism: a postcolonial reading. Continuum International Publishing Group. ISBN 978-0-567-24719-3. "Like other Hellenistic kings, the Seleucids ruled with the help of their "friends" and a Greco-Macedonian elite class separate from the native populations whom they governed."
