= Pseudo-Alexander (disambiguation) =

Pseudo-Alexander was a pretender to the Macedonian throne in 148 BC.

Pseudo-Alexander may also refer to:

- Pseudo-Alexander the Great, name for the author of:
  - Epistola Alexandri ad Aristotelem, a letter falsely attributed to Alexander the Great
  - Collatio Alexandri cum Dindimo per litteras facta, correspondence including three letters falsely attributed to Alexander the Great
- Pseudo-Alexander of Aphrodisias, author of Medical Puzzles and Natural Problems, misattributed to Alexander of Aphrodisias
- Pseudo-Alexander I, name for those False Decretals attributed to Pope Alexander I
- Pseudo-Alexander de Villa Dei, name for the author of:
  - Summarium Biblicum, an extremely condensed summary of the Bible, sometimes attributed to Alexander of Villedieu
  - Carmen de algorismo, a poem on arithmetic, sometimes attributed to Alexander of Villedieu
