= Pseudo-Perseus =

Philip VII/Perseus II

King of Macedonia
- Reign: 143 BC
- Predecessor: Pseudo-Alexander
- Successor: Roman conquest (Pseudo-Philip)
- Died: 143 BC (likely)
- Greek: Φίλιππος (Philippos); Περσεύς (Perseus)
- House: Antigonid dynasty (claimed)
- Father: Perseus of Macedon (claimed)

Pseudo-Perseus, also known as Pseudo-Philip, was a Macedonian pretender who led an uprising against Roman rule in Macedonia in 143 BC. He claimed to be a son or descendant of King Perseus, the last ruler of the Antigonid dynasty.

== Historical Context ==
After the defeat of Perseus of Macedon at the Battle of Pydna in 168 BC, Rome dismantled the Antigonid monarchy. Macedonia was later transformed into a Roman province following the defeat of Andriscus (Pseudo-Philip) in 148 BC. Despite these measures, dynastic claims continued to serve as a focal point for resistance to Roman domination.

== Revolt ==
Around 143 BC, another pretender emerged, claiming royal Antigonid descent as an other son of Perseus of Macedon. He presented himself under the name Philip or Perseus (sources vary) most likely to show his link to Perseus or claim he was Philip, an adoptive son/half brother of Perseus (as Perseus had adopted this man as his heir before having his son).

Eutropius, a Roman historian writing well into the late Roman Empire, reports that he raised a force of about 16,000 men with the only mention of his army composition being that slaves were present.

The revolt was short-lived. Roman forces, likely under the authority of the provincial command or Roman magistrates active in the region, defeated the pretender decisively by the end of the year. After his defeat, it is believed that he was executed or killed by Lucius Tremellius Scrofa.

== Legacy ==
Pseudo-Philip/Pseudo-Perseus's rebellion was the last concrete one in the region as the next one by Euephenes barely got to start before getting stopped. His failure confirmed the permanence of Roman control in Macedonia and marked the end of the royal pretenders as a serious political threat in the region.
