= Euephenes =

King of Macedonia
- Reign: 93 BC
- Predecessor: Pseudo-Philip
- Successor: final Roman conquest
- Greek: Εὐφάντης (Euephenes)

Euephenes (Ancient Greek: Εὐφάντης; fl. 93 BC) was a Macedonian rebel and pretender who attempted to lead an uprising against Roman rule in the province of Macedonia during the late Roman Republic.

The status he claimed is debated, but it is thought that he stylised himself as a king, since he claimed Antigonid heritage; however, the link to the family is unproven and was likely fabricated to gather support.

== Background ==
Following Rome's victory in the Fourth Macedonian War (150–148 BC), the Macedonian monarchy was abolished and Macedonia reorganized as a Roman province in 146 BC. Although Roman administration brought relative stability, resentment toward foreign rule persisted, giving rise to sporadic revolts and dynastic pretenders in the following decades.

== Revolt of 93 BC ==
In 93 BC, Euephenes, described by later sources as a young Macedonian, proclaimed himself king and called for the restoration of Macedonian independence. He was preparing a major revolt in the territory of Macedonia, but it was to no avail; he was apprehended before the uprising began. After this, his fate remains unknown, but he was likely executed to discourage further uprisings in the region.

== Legacy ==
Although inconclusive, his was the last decently recorded revolt in Macedonia, and the last attempt at restoring the monarchy. His failed uprising is one of several minor attempts to challenge Roman authority prior to the major upheavals of the Mithridatic Wars.
