= Pseudo-Philip (112/111 BC) =

Philip VIII

King of Macedonia
- Reign: 112 or 111 BC
- Predecessor: Pseudo-Philip/Pseudo-Perseus
- Successor: Roman conquest (Euephenes)
- Died: 112 or 111 BC
- Greek: Φίλιππος (Philippos)
- House: Antigonid dynasty (claimed)
- Father: Perseus of Macedon (likely claimed)

Pseudo-Philip (Ancient Greek: Φίλιππος, Philippos; fl. 112/111 BC) was a Greek pretender who attempted to claim the throne of the ancient kingdom of Macedonia as Philip VIII after the defeat of the previous pretender. He likely claimed to be a son of the last Macedonian king Perseus.

It is said that in 112 or 111 BC, while the Romans were engaged in suppressing a new incursion by a Scordisci tribe (as that tribe claimed the neighboring region of Panonia), yet another Pseudo-Philip tried to exploit the situation and proclaim himself king. His revolt was of short duration as he was quickly defeated and most likely killed by Marcus Livius Drusus the governor of Macedonia at the time who was awarded a triumph for his military victory.

== Sources ==
- Rihlik and Kouba, Istorija na Makedonija, p. 58
