= Charlotte Niese =

German writer, poet and teacher

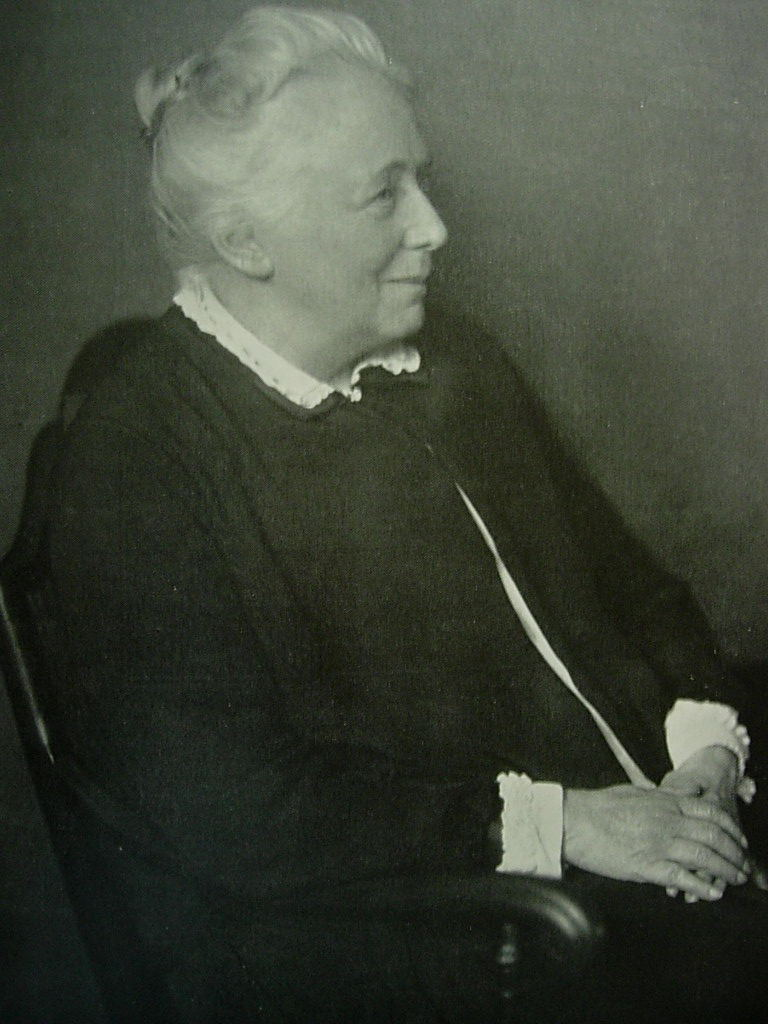
- Born: 7 June 1854; Burg, Fehmarn, Duchy of Schleswig
- Died: 8 December 1935 (aged 81); Ottensen, Germany
- Occupations: Writer, poet and teacher

Charlotte Niese (7 June 1854 – 8 December 1935) was a German writer, poet and teacher.

== Life ==
Niese was born in Burg on the island of Fehmarn, then under the direct rule of King Frederick VII of Denmark. Her father was the local pastor who later became director of a seminary in Eckernförde. Her mother was Benedicte Marie Niese (born Matthiesen). Charlotte Niese passed her exams as a teacher in Eckernförde, and she became a tutor in what was, since 1866, the Prussian Province of Schleswig-Holstein, in the Rhine Province, and as a boarding school teacher in Montreux.

Niese went with her mother, then a widow, to Plön and began publishing her writings, at first under the masculine pseudonym "Lucian Bürger".

In 1884, Niese settled in the city of Altona, where her mother used to live, and in 1888 she moved to Ottensen, which in 1889 became a part of Altona. She no longer needed to work as a teacher, as she had become one of the best known Holstein regional writers.

In her work, Niese campaigned not only for the improvement of educational and employment opportunities for women, but also managed the local section of the North German Women's Organisation in Altona. As a child she had seen that her six brothers, one of whom was the Classical scholar Benedikt Niese, were all allowed higher education and professional careers, while her father refused these to herself or her sister. She herself wrote only within the socially accepted boundaries of women's writing of her day, her socially conservative views preventing her from more radical action. The closest she got to political activity was signing a letter of protest against the construction of a tramway line, along the street where she lived, in 1904.

Niese died in her home in 1935 and was buried in the nearby Altona-Ottensen cemetery.

== Works ==
- Cajus Rungholt; appeared under the pseudonym Lucian Bürger
- Licht und Schatten (Light and Shadows, 1895)
- Vergangenheit – Erzählung aus der Emigrantenzeit (1902), "Past – Account from the Emigrants Time"
- Stadt, in der ich wohne ("The City I live in", 1908)
- Minette von Söhlenthal (1909), "Minette of Sohlenthal"
- Allerlei Schicksale ("A mixture of fates")
- Als der Mond in Dorotheens Zimmer schien ('As the Moon shone into Dorothea's room')
- Aus dänischer Zeit (Bilder und Skizzen, Erinnerungen an die Kindheit in Burg), "From Danish Times – Pictures and sketches, Memories of Childhood in Burg"
- Aus schweren Tagen ("From Difficult Days")
- Das Lagerkind (Geschichte aus dem deutschen Krieg, published 1914), stories from the German war
- Der Verrückte Flinsheim und Zwei Andere Novellen (1914), "Crazy Flinsheim and two other novels"
- Barbarentöchter (Eine Erzählung aus der Zeit des Weltkrieges, published 1915), "Barbarian Daughters" (an account from the time of World War I)
- Das Tagebuch der Ottony von Kelchberg ("The Diary of ~ ")
- Die Allerjüngste ("The Very Youngest")
- Die Hexe von Mayen ("The Witch of Mayen")
- Er und Sie ("He and She")
- Geschichten aus Holstein ("Stories from Holstein")
- Nesthäkchen Gretel – Eine von den Jüngsten ("Gretel, baby of the family – One of the Youngsters")
- Reisezeit ("Travel Time")
- Von denen, die daheim geblieben ("Of Those Who Stayed Home")
- Was Mahlmann erzählte ("What Mahlmann Recounted")
- Was Michel Schneidewind als Junge erlebte ("What Michel Schneidewind Lived when Young")
- Vom Kavalier und seiner Nichte (1919), "Of the Cavalier and His Niece"
- Von Gestern und Vorgestern – Lebenserinnerungen (1924), "From Yesterday and the day before – Memoirs"
- Die Reise der Gräfin Sibylle (1926), "The Journey of Countess Sibylle"
- Schloß Emkendorf (1928), "Castle Emkendorf"
- Unter dem Joch des Korsen – Volksstück in 5 Aufzügen ("Under the Yoke of the Corsican" – folk play in 5 sets)

More of her writings appeared in the illustrated family periodical Die Gartenlaube. Some of her novels and short stories were translated into other languages, including Flemish.
