= Pseudo-Alexander =

Alexander VI

King of Macedonia
- Reign: 148 BC
- Predecessor: Andriscus
- Successor: Roman conquest (Pseudo-Philip/Pseudo-Perseus)
- Greek: Ἀλέξανδρος (Aléxandros)
- House: Antigonid dynasty (claimed)
- Father: Perseus of Macedon (claimed)

Pseudo-Alexander (Ancient Greek: Ἀλέξανδρος, Aléxandros; fl. 148 BC) was a Greek pretender who attempted to claim the throne of the ancient kingdom of Macedonia as Alexander VI after the defeat of the previous claimant, Andriscus (Philip VI) against the Roman Republic during the Fourth Macedonian War. Like Andriscus, Alexander also claimed to be a son of the last legitimate Macedonian king Perseus (r. 179 – 168 BC).

Alexander invaded Macedonia from Thrace in 148 BC, almost immediately after the Roman praetor Quintus Caecilius Metellus Macedonicus had defeated Andriscus, but was also defeated by Metellus and pursued to Dardania, whereafter his fate is unknown.
