= Andriscus =

Basileus of Macedonia (fl. 154/153 – 146 BC)

Andriscus (Philip VI)
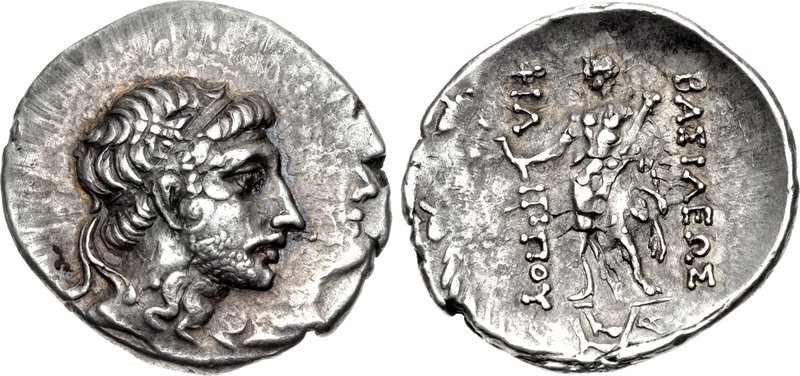
- Coin issued by Andriscus during his reign; Greek inscription reads ΒΑΣΙΛΕΩΣ ΦΙΛΙΠΠΟΥ (King Philip)

Basileus of Macedonia
- Reign: 149–148 BC
- Predecessor: Perseus (as king); Roman client republics in Macedon (actual)
- Successor: Roman conquest (Alexander VI)
- Born: Unknown; Presumed to be Adramyttium in Aeolis (modern-day Edremit, Balıkesir, Turkey)
- Died: 146 BC; Rome, Roman Italy
- Greek: Ἀνδρίσκος (Andrískos); Φίλιππος (Philippos) - royal name
- House: Antigonid dynasty (claimed)
- Father: Perseus of Macedon (claimed)

Andriscus (Ancient Greek: Ἀνδρίσκος, Andrískos; fl. 154/153 – 146 BC), also often referenced as Pseudo-Philip, was a Greek pretender who became the last independent king of Macedon in 149 BC as Philip VI (Ancient Greek: Φίλιππος, Philipos), based on his claim of being Philip, a now-obscure son of the last legitimate Macedonian king, Perseus. His reign lasted just one year and was toppled by the Roman Republic during the Fourth Macedonian War.

Ancient sources generally agree that he was originally a fuller from Adramyttium in Aeolis in western Anatolia. Around 153 BC, his ancestry was supposedly revealed to him, upon which he travelled to the court of his claimed uncle, the Seleucid monarch Demetrius I Soter, to request assistance in claiming his throne. Demetrius refused and had him sent to Rome, where he was judged harmless and exiled to a city in Italy; he managed to escape, and after gathering support, primarily from Thrace, he launched an invasion of Macedon, defeating Rome's clients and establishing his rule as king. The Romans naturally reacted militarily, triggering war; after some initial successes, Andriscus was defeated and captured by the praetor Quintus Caecilius Metellus Macedonicus, who subdued Macedon once again.

He was imprisoned for two years before being paraded in Metellus' triumph in 146 BC, after which he was executed. In the aftermath of his revolt, the Romans established the Roman province of Macedonia, ending Macedonian independence and establishing a permanent presence in the region.

== Origins and early life ==
Details of his origins are vague and sometimes conflicting, though it is generally believed that he was a fuller from Adramyttium in Aeolis in western Anatolia. His exact date of birth is unknown, though according to his own story, he was "of maturity" when he made his claims of royalty in 154 BC, and had been raised by a Cretan in Adramyttium.

By his own claims, he was educated at Adramyttium until adolescence, until the Cretan died, after which he was raised with his foster mother. Upon reaching maturity, his mother (or foster mother, according to his claim) gave him a sealed parchment that was supposedly written by Perseus himself, along with the knowledge of the location of two hidden treasures, at Amphipolis and Thessalonica; he would later use these to advance his claims. Ancient sources are unanimous in calling him an impostor and dismiss the story as false; Niese suggests that there is a possibility of his claims being true, but generally agrees that he was a pretender; his main advantage in his claims was his close resemblance to Perseus.

Around 154/153 BC, he left Pergamon for Syria, where he declared his claim to be the illegitimate son of Perseus by a concubine. According to his own account, it was due to his mother (or foster mother) urging him to leave Pergamon to avoid the wrath of the pro-Roman Eumenes II.

== Claiming the throne ==
=== In Syria ===
He first staked his claim in Syria. Livy and Cassius Dio write that he simply went from Pergamon to Syria and directly staked his claim before the Seleucid monarch, Demetrius I Soter. Diodorus Siculus offers a different account. According to him, Andriscus was already a mercenary in Demetrius' army. Due to his resemblance to the former Macedonian king, his comrades started jokingly calling him "son of Perseus"; these jokes soon began becoming serious suspicions, and at one point, Andriscus himself decided to seize the opportunity and claimed that he was indeed the son of Perseus. Niese attempts to reconcile both accounts, suggesting that he might have travelled to Syria and then enlisted as a mercenary before staking his claim.

He appealed to the king to help him win back his "ancestral" throne, and found great popular support among the Seleucid populace, to the extent that there were riots in the capital, Antioch. Large segments of the Seleucid population were of Macedonian descent, nurturing strong anti-Roman sentiment since the Roman conquest of Macedon in the Third Macedonian War; they were eager to help the claimant. (Note: Inviting Greek and Macedonian settlers to the Seleucid realm, and promoting the Hellenization of the realm, was a common policy of the Seleucids; this was the reason for large populations of Macedonian and Greek descent.) They proceeded to such an extent that there were even calls for deposing the king if he did not help the pretender. Unmoved, or perhaps frightened, Demetrius had Andriscus arrested and sent to Rome. (Note: Supporting Andriscus was difficult because Rome was already suspicious of Demetrius; he had been a Seleucid hostage at Rome who had escaped and then become king without the Roman Senate's approval for the first year of his reign. Also, his wife, Laodice V, had been the wife of Rome's former enemy, Perseus of Macedon; she had married Demetrius after Perseus' defeat and death.)

=== In Rome ===
In Rome, he was brought before the Senate, where Dio writes that he stood "in general contempt" due to what was perceived to be his ordinary nature and transparently false claim. The Romans believed his claim to be fake, because the real Philip had died at Alba Fucens two years after his father Perseus. Considering him harmless, they simply exiled him to an Italian city, but he managed to escape; fleeing Italy, he went to the Greek world, to the city of Miletus.

=== Gaining support ===
In Miletus, he tried to advance his claims further, attracting significant attention and sympathy. When the leaders of Miletus learned about this, they arrested him and sought advice from visiting Roman envoys on what to do with him; the envoys were contemptuous of the pretender and told the Miletans he was safe to release. He continued his travels through Ionia, meeting former acquaintances of Perseus and gaining an audience with Kallipa, a former concubine of Perseus who was now married to Athenaios, brother of the Pergamene king Attalus II Philadelphus. Being a Macedonian by birth, and due to her former connections to the Antigonids, she accepted his claim and agreed to help him, giving him money and slaves, and probably recommending that he travel to Thrace, where he would find a following. (Note: It has been suggested that being the wife of the king's brother, Kallipa could not have acted secretly, and that Athenaios and Attalus knew of her intrigues with Andriscus and deliberately allowed them to proceed. However, this is contradicted by the fact that a restored Macedon would be a threat to the Pergamenes, and that the Pergamenes would loyally assist Rome in the subsequent war against Andriscus.)

He was also received favourably in Byzantium. He finally arrived in Thrace, where he met Teres III, who had married the granddaughter of Perseus and was the son of Cotys IV, who had once been an ally of Perseus. Teres and the other Thracian chieftains, especially a certain Barsabas, received him enthusiastically; he held a coronation ceremony at Teres' court, was given a few hundred Thracian troops, and set off on his campaign.

== Conquest of Macedon ==
His first attempt to invade was unsuccessful, and he initially did not inspire much enthusiasm among the Macedonians; this made the Romans complacent about the pretender. However, he soon managed to encounter a force of Rome's Macedonian client republics, defeating them in Odomantice; he then invaded Macedon proper, defeating Rome's clients on the banks of the Strymon river. Amidst popular acclaim, he crowned himself king at the old Macedonian capital of Pella in 150/149 BC.

=== Popular support ===
Although the Macedonians' initial attitude had been lukewarm, his successes won him popularity and widespread support in Macedon. Anti-Roman sentiment was common in Macedon; the populace was obliging in overthrowing the old regime. Support for Andriscus was not uniform — there was significantly more hesitation among the gentry and upper classes, and somewhat more enthusiasm among the lower classes — but the popular mood was largely in his favour. His claims were bolstered by his correct prediction of the locations of two treasures, which he claimed were specified in the "sealed writing" that had been handed to his caretakers by Perseus, and had later been given to him. Even if there were apprehensions about the veracity of his claim, Niese notes that "one liked to believe what one wished; the re-establishment of Macedonia enabled liberation from the burden of Roman rule. The longer these burdens had been borne, the happier they [the Macedonians] were at the prospect of Macedonia under a king restored from the old lineage."

However, it has also been suggested that the extent of his support may not have been as widespread as often believed, and that a significant amount of the Macedonian populace remained pro-republican and pro-Roman. The relative lack of reprisals towards Macedon after his defeat, as compared to the destructions of Corinth and Carthage in the same period, has been suggested as evidence for this theory.

== Reign ==
=== Military campaigns ===
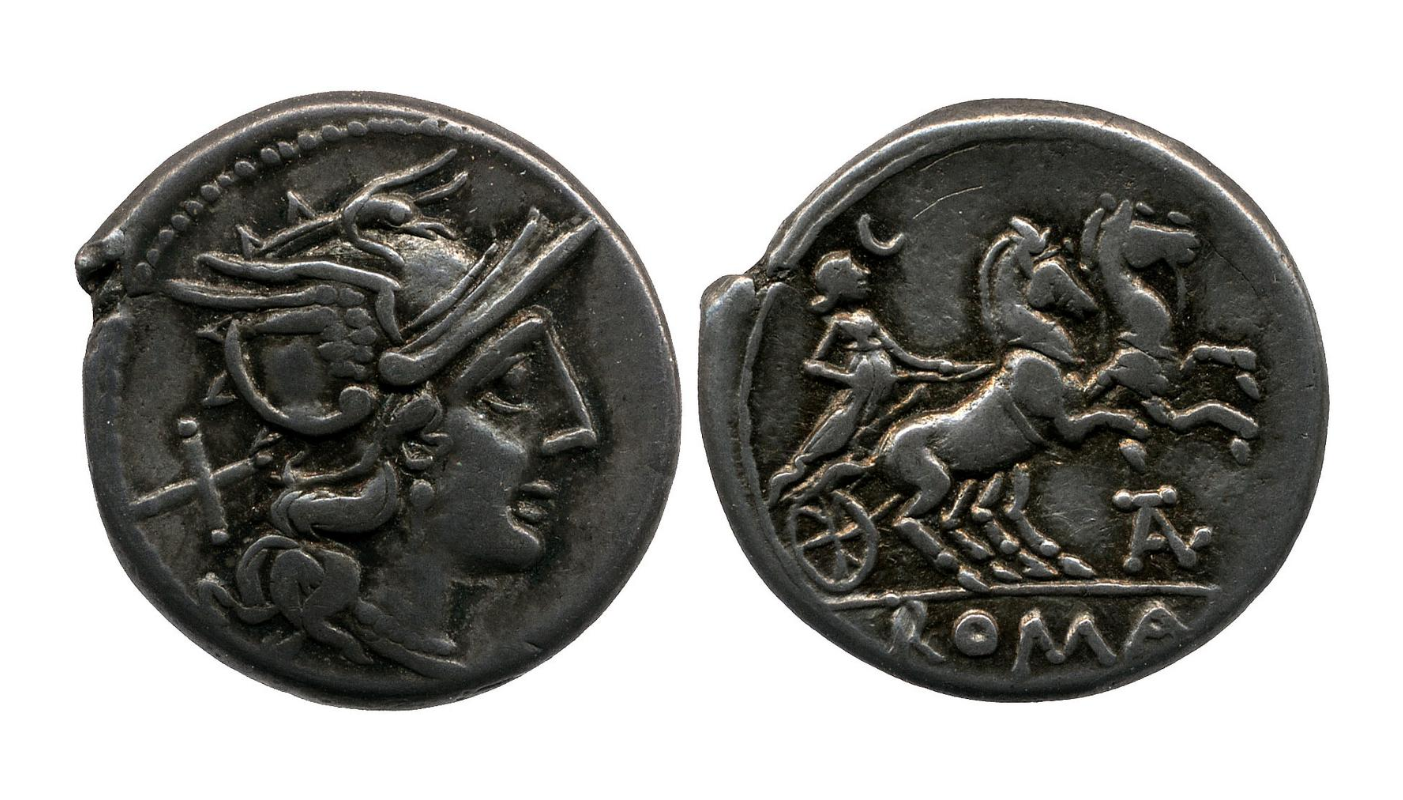
Possible denarius minted by Publius Juventius Thalna c. 179–170 BC.

Andriscus' reign was defined to a significant degree by his military campaigns, due to his being in a constant state of war with Rome. After his conquest of the Kingdom, he enlarged the army and began campaigns to conquer Thessaly, a key part of the realm of the old Antigonids. Initial resistance to him were from ad hoc forces of Roman allies in Greece, a few Roman units and legates in the region and some resistance from the remnants of Rome's client republics in Macedon, some elements of which seem to have survived for some time into his reign. Soon, however, the Romans sent a legion under the praetor Publius Juventius Thalna to defeat the pretender.

Thalna, however, appears to have underestimated Andriscus' strength, not taking into account the fact that the king's army had grown dramatically since his enthronement. Andriscus attacked and fought him at an unspecified location in Thessaly (Dio gives it as "near the borders of Macedon"); details of the engagement are scarce, but Thalna was killed and his forces almost annihilated. It was the worst defeat Rome would suffer at the hands of the Macedonians; Florus remarks on the irony of how "they that were invincible against real kings, were defeated by this imaginary and pretended king". The victory greatly increased the king's prestige; he obtained an alliance with Carthage, and his domestic popularity was increased dramatically, allowing him to stamp out republican resistance and conquer Thessaly.

=== Foreign policy ===
At first, Andriscus attempted to negotiate his position with Rome, but when it became clear that they would not recognize his throne, he embarked on a strongly anti-Roman policy, He continued to cultivate his relations with his Thracian allies, to whom he owed his throne; they would continue to provide significant forces for him during his reign.

Foreign interest in relations with him increased dramatically after his victory over Thalna; as mentioned before, Carthage, which was under attack from Rome in the Third Punic War, allied itself to him and promised him money and ships, though these could not be sent before his ultimate defeat. Significant sympathy, possibly cultivated to a degree by him, arose in Greece; however, the Achaean League remained pro-Roman and continued to resist and fight him. King Attalus II Philadelphus of Pergamon remained staunchly pro-Roman; the Pergamenes were terrified of the prospect of a revived and strong Macedonia on their doorstep.

=== Domestic policy ===
Domestically, Andriscus implemented a strongly anti-Roman and anti-Republican policy. Ancient historians interpreted this as his cruelty and tyranny; it has been suggested that these were simply manifestations of his anti-Roman policy and his persecutions of his opponents, including pro-Roman republicans.

At the same time, it is also possible that he was indeed tyrannical. His persecutions increased significantly after his victory over Thalna, costing him significant popularity; this would have dire consequences for him later.

=== Coinage ===
The extent and nature of Andriscus' coinage is a matter of debate. It has been suggested that many of his coins were overstrikes of previous Antigonid, republican and Roman coinage. He issued a very small amount of silver drachmae, on which he pictured himself as a Hellenistic king, and added Herakles on the reverse. Only three coins of Andriscus are known, two of which are overstruck, one on a drachm of the Thessalian League, the other on a Roman denarius. It is therefore possible that he also used the denarii he seized as booty after his victory against Thalna to mint his own coins. The coins are also of poor quality, due to the short duration of his reign, the need to reuse old dies and the need to quickly produce wartime coinage.

Some non-royal coinage has also been discovered and dated to the period of his reign, possibly struck by the remnants of the pro-Roman republics. It has also been suggested that the king was more liberal than implied by the sources, and allowed some degree of independent coinage.

== Downfall and death ==
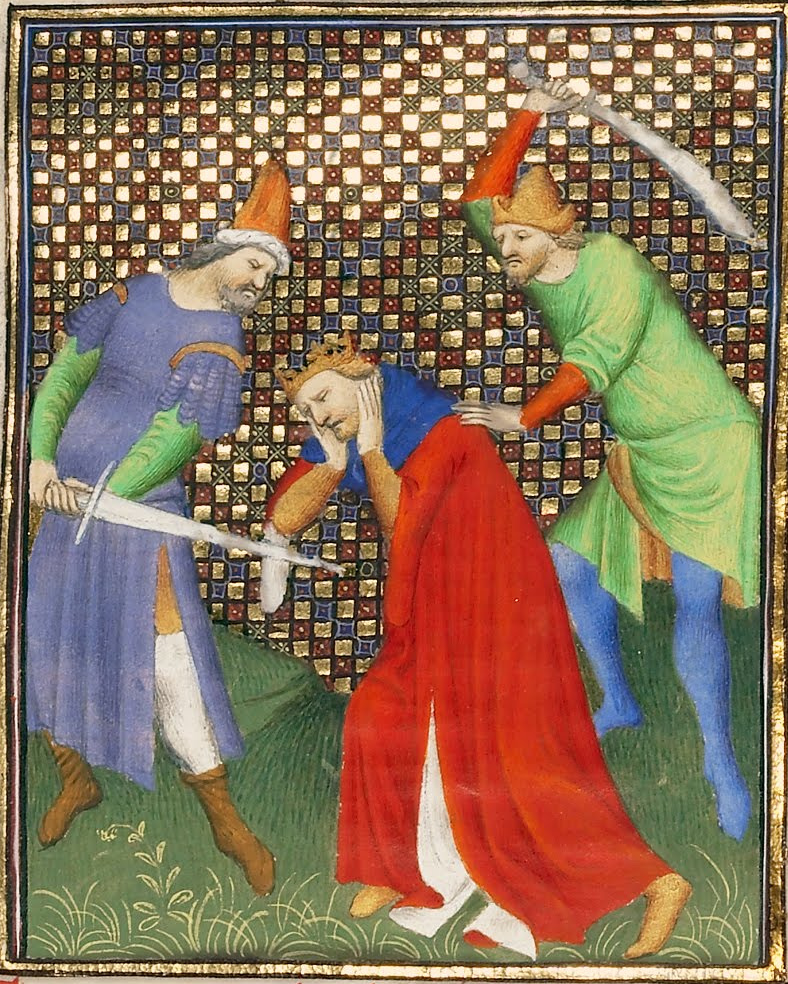
Death of the "false Philip" in a 15th-century miniature.

Thalna's defeat shook Roman prestige in the East, and made the Senate realize the full significance of the revolt. They organized a full consular army of two legions under praetor Quintus Caecilius Metellus, to defeat Andriscus and check, if not quell, his uprising. Arriving in Greece in 148 BC, Metellus marched along the Thessalian coast in a combined land and sea advance, while the allied Pergamene fleet threatened the coastal district of northern Macedonia. To protect himself against both offensives, Andriscus took up a defensive position with his main army at Pydna, where Metellus engaged him in battle. In the ensuing Battle of Pydna, Andrisus was decisively defeated. His harsh persecutions during his reign now showed their consequences; this single battle was enough to make him lose control of Macedon, as the people submitted to Metellus. (Note: In fact, the battle itself may have been decided by treachery in Andriscus' ranks; it is known that an important Macedonian general, Telestes, defected at a crucial period in the war.) He was forced to flee to Thrace, his original base of support, and began organizing a new army; however, Metellus pursued him swiftly and routed his forces before he could prepare them. Andriscus then fled to the Thracian princeling Byzes; however, Metellus managed to persuade the latter into becoming a Roman ally and handing Andriscus over as a prisoner, ending his reign.

He remained a prisoner over the next two years, while Metellus subdued any remaining Macedonian resistance, organized Macedon as a province and settled the Achaean War of 146 BC. When Metellus returned to Rome in 146 BC, he received the agnomen Macedonicus for his victory and was granted a triumph. Andriscus was brought in chains and paraded in the triumph, and later executed — the last king to reign over Macedon.

== Assessment and legacy ==
Ancient sources are extremely hostile, not only to the origins and claims, but also of the character of Andriscus — Diodorus calls him "shot through with cruelty, greed and every base quality"; Dio and Livy call him "a man of the lowest kind". They also describe him as cruel and tyrannical; accusations of tyranny probably reflect his harsh persecutions of pro-Roman and pro-republican elements in Macedon. At the same time, it is possible that he was indeed tyrannical, especially after his victory over Thalna, and perpetrated acts of terrorism and repression against his subjects.

His main legacy was that in the aftermath of his revolt, the Romans understood the strength of anti-Roman feeling that had arisen in Macedon, and realized that the old administration could not be sustained — a thorough reorganization was necessary. Another reason why reorganization was necessary was that Andriscus' persecutions had killed many pro-Roman republicans and thoroughly disrupted the old administrative structure; it would be difficult to re-establish it. Therefore, the Senate made Macedon a Roman province, with Metellus as its first governor.

== Sources ==
=== Primary sources ===
- Velleius Paterculus, Roman history, Book I
- Florus, Epitome, Book 1;
- Livy, Ab Urbe Condita Libri, Periochae 46-50 and 51-55
- Diodorus Siculus, Bibliotheca Historica, Book 32
- Polybius, Histories, Book 37
- Cassius Dio, Roman History, Book 21

=== Secondary sources ===
- Morgan, M. Gwyn (1969). "Metellus Macedonicus and the Province Macedonia". Historia: Zeitschrift für Alte Geschichte. 18 (4): 422–446. JSTOR 4435094.
- Émile Chambry; Émeline Marquis; Alain Billault; Dominique Goust (2015), Éditions Robert Laffont (ed.), Lucian (in French), translated by Émile Chambry, Paris, ISBN 978-2-221-10902-1
- Hoover, Oliver D. (2000). "A Dedication to Aphrodite Epekoos for Demetrius I Soter and His Family". Zeitschrift für Papyrologie und Epigraphik. 131: 106–110. JSTOR 20190661.
- MacKay, Pierre A. (1968). "Macedonian Tetradrachms of 148-147 B.C.". Museum Notes (American Numismatic Society). 14: 15–40. JSTOR 43573445.
- Niese, Benedict (1903). Geschichte der griechischen und makedonischen Staaten seit der Schlacht bei Chaeronea (in German). Gotha F.A. Perthes.
- Kuzmin, Yuri N. (2013). "Kallippa and Beroia". Rheinisches Museum für Philologie. 156 (3/4): 277–287. ISSN 0035-449X. JSTOR 24392713.
- Crawford, Michael (1974). Roman republican coinage. Cambridge University Press. ISBN 9780521074926.
- Hoover, Oliver D. (2016). "Handbook of Coins of Macedon and Its Neighbors. Part I: Macedon, Illyria, and Epeiros, Sixth to First Centuries BC". The Handbook of Greek Coinage Series. Vol. 3. Lancaster/London: Classical Numismatic Group. ISBN 9780989825412.
