= Teres III =

Teres III (Ancient Greek: Τήρης) was a king of the Odrysians in Thrace in c. 149 BC, the son of Cotys IV.

== See also ==
- List of Thracian tribes
