= Benedikt Niese =

German classical scholar (1849–1910)

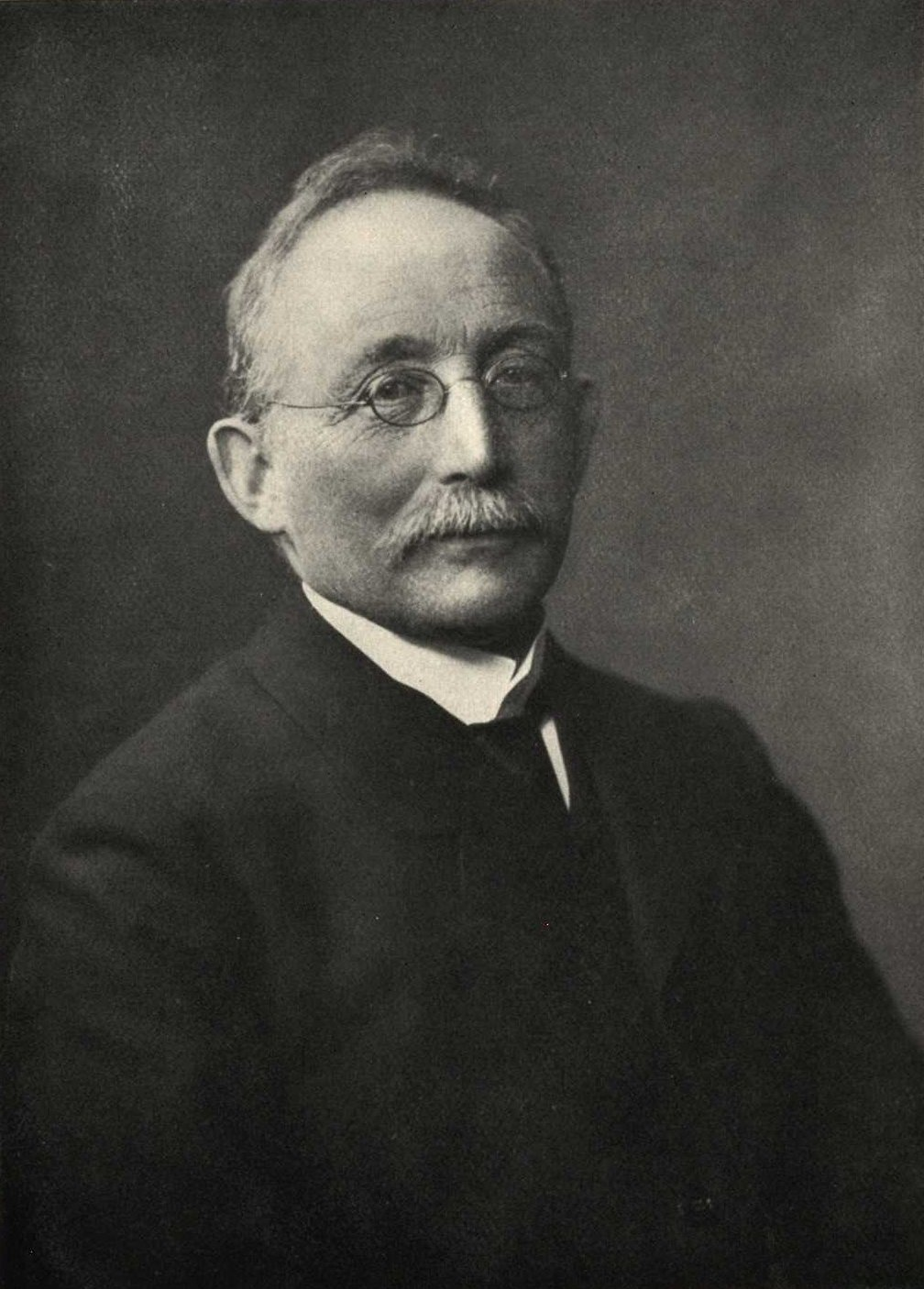
Benedikt Niese

Jürgen Anton Benedikt Niese (24 November 1849 – 1 February 1910), also known as Benedict, Benediktus or Benedictus Niese, was a German classical scholar.

Niese was born in Burg, on the island of Fehmarn, then part of the German Confederation but ruled by King Frederick VII of Denmark. His father was Emil August Niese, pastor in the town, and his mother was born Benedicte Marie Matthiessen. He was educated at the Domgymnasium in Schleswig and then from 1867 at Bonn and Kiel, studying under Alfred von Gutschmid. After volunteering for the army during the Franco-Prussian War, he was awarded a PhD in 1872. After teaching for a short time in a secondary school in Flensburg, he travelled in Italy and France. In 1876 he became a lecturer at the University of Göttingen. He was a professor at the University of Marburg from 1877 to 1881, after which he became Professor of Classical Philology at the University of Breslau. In 1885 he took the same post at Marburg and was rector there in 1900/01. In 1906 he was appointed Professor of Ancient History at the University of Halle, and died there in 1910. In 1881 he married Bertha Zimmerman (1859–1937). Their son Hans was born in 1882. He became a lecturer in History at University of Göttingen and died in 1915 in the First World War. Their daughter Annemarie was born in 1890 and died in 1975.

Niese is best known for his then definitive editio maior of the works of the Jewish historian Josephus (Weidmann, Berlin, 1885–1895), based on a detailed study of the best manuscripts available. His numbering system is still the most commonly used when referring to the text. His other works include Grundriß der römischen Geschichte, 1889–1905), Studien insbesondere über klassische griechische Autoren and Die Entwicklung der homerischen Poesie, 1882. Geschichte der griechischen und makedonischen Staaten seit der Schlacht bei Chaeronea was published between 1893 and 1899.

Niese's sister was the writer Charlotte Niese.

== Works ==
- De Stephani Byzantii auctoribus. Commentatio prima, etc. (A study of Stephanus of Byzantium. Kiel, 1873.)
- Der homerische Schiffskatalog als historische Quelle betrachtet. (The Homeric Ship Catalogue Considered as a Historical Source) (Kiel, 1873.)
- Die Entwickelung der Homerischen Poesie (The development of Homeric poetry. Berlin, 1882)
- Flavii Josephi opera (Works of Flavius Josephus, 7 volumes, Weidmann, Berlin 1885–1895).
- De Annalibus Romanis observationes. (Marburg, 1886)
- Geschichte der griechischen und makedonischen Staaten seit der Schlacht bei Chaeronea (History of the Greek and Macedonian states after the battle of Chaeronea) (Published in three parts, 1893-1903.)
- Grundriss der römischen Geschichte (Sketches of Roman History) (1889–1905)
- Kritik der beiden Makkabäerbücher, nebst Beiträgen zur Geschichte der makkabäischen Erhebung (Berlin, 1900)
- Staat und Gesellschaft der Römer
- Zur Geschichte Solons und seiner Zeit
- Neue Deutsche Biographie, 1998.
- Deutsche Biographische Encyclopädia, Munich, 1998
