= Archon (disambiguation) =

Archon (Gr. αρχων, pl. αρχοντες) is a Greek word that means "ruler".

Archon may also refer to:

== Butterflies and moths ==
- Archon (butterfly), a genus of butterflies
- Paysandisia archon, a moth

== Entertainment ==
- Archon (convention), a science fiction/gaming convention held in Collinsville, Illinois
- Archon (Dungeons & Dragons), a fantasy race featured in the Dungeons & Dragons role-playing game
- Archon: The Light and the Dark, a 1983 video game
- Archon II: Adept, a 1984 video game
- Archons, the crew of the U.S.S. Archon in the original Star Trek episode "The Return of the Archons"
- The Archon, the second book of the Oracle Prophecies Trilogy by Catherine Fisher
- Archon, an Angelic Battle-Priest from the video game Darksiders II
- Archon, a character from the video game Mass Effect: Andromeda
- Archons, powerful hybrid enemies bearing resemblance to Gnostic archons in the video game Warframe
- Archons, gods who rule each of the seven nations in Teyvat in Genshin Impact

== People ==
- Archon of Pella, a satrap of Babylonia and one of the Diadochi
- Archon of Aegeira, an Achaean statesman in the 2nd century BCE

== Other uses ==
- Archon, Aisne, a commune in northern France
- Archon (Gnosticism), a kind of supernatural being who stood between the human race and a transcendent God
- Archon (software), open source archival information system
- Archon Corporation, a company that has owned casinos and water parks
- Archon X Prize, a genomics contest
- ARCHON Directory, a computer directory in the UK's National Archives
- Archon, an object classification in the SCP Foundation storytelling project

== See also ==
- Archons of the Ecumenical Patriarchate, an award of merit bestowed by the Patriarch of Constantinople
- Archaeon, a domain of single-celled microorganisms
- Archonta, a (possibly obsolete) category of mammals including primates and bats
- Arcon (disambiguation)
