= Xenarchus =

Xenarchus or Xenarchos may refer to:

- Xenarchus (comic poet) (4th century BC), ancient Greek playwright of Middle Comedy
- Xenarchus (strategos) (fl. 175 BC), ancient Greek ambassador to Rome from the Achaean League
- Xenarchus of Seleucia (1st century BC), ancient Greek philosopher and grammarian
- Xenarchus (moth), a genus of moth
