= Arcon =

Arcon or ARCON may refer to:

== People ==
- Arcon 2, musician
- Jean Le Michaud d'Arçon (1733–1800), French general
- Luis Arcon (born 1992), Venezuelan boxer
- Sandi Arčon (born 1991), Slovenian football player

== Places ==
- Arcon, Loire, France
- Arçon, Doubs, France

== Acronyms ==
- Architects Registration Council of Nigeria, a regulatory body for architecture
- Advertising Regulatory Council of Nigeria, a regulatory body for advertising

== See also ==
- Archon (disambiguation)
