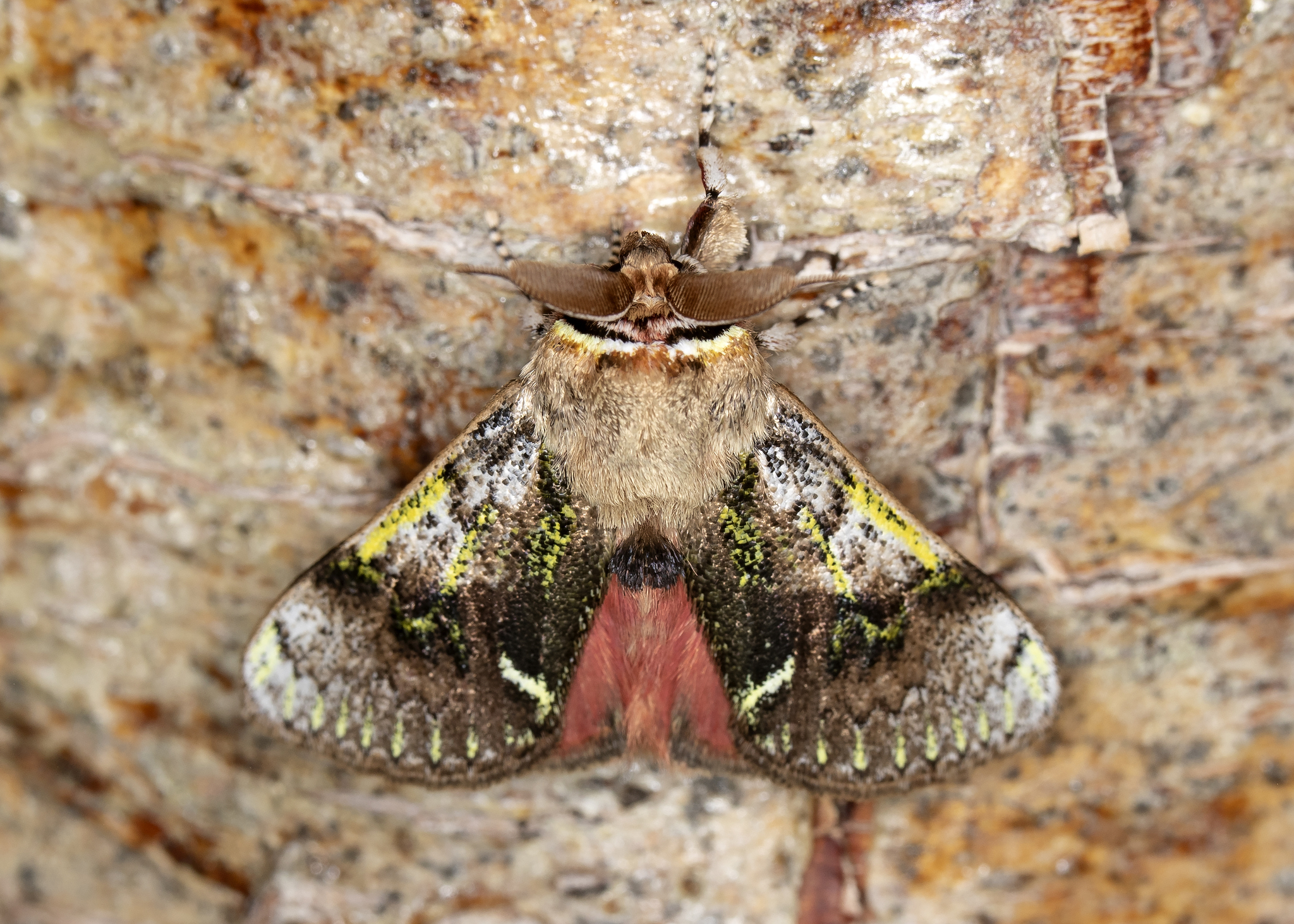

Scientific classification
- Domain: Eukaryota
- Kingdom: Animalia
- Phylum: Arthropoda
- Class: Insecta
- Order: Lepidoptera
- Family: Aididae
- Genus: Aidos
- Species: A. yamouna

Binomial name
- Aidos yamouna (Dognin, 1891)

Synonyms
- Euclea yamouna Dognin, 1891; Aidos nuncilla Dognin, 1914; Aidos cynosura Dognin, 1911

= Aidos yamouna =

Species of moth

Aidos yamouna is a moth of the Aididae family found in Ecuador and Colombia.
