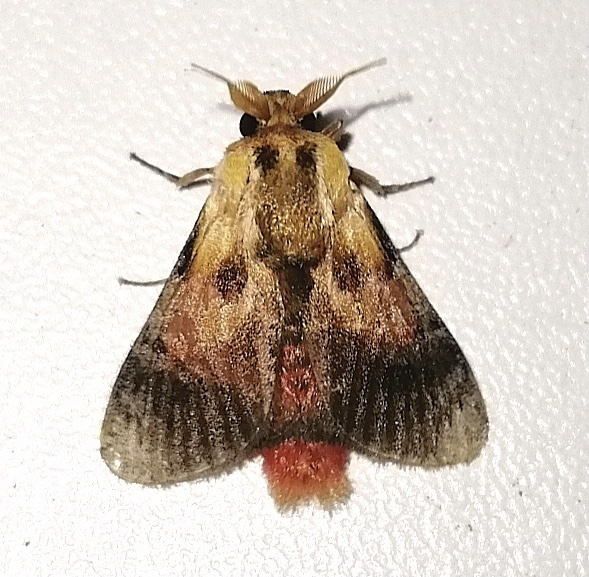

Scientific classification
- Domain: Eukaryota
- Kingdom: Animalia
- Phylum: Arthropoda
- Class: Insecta
- Order: Lepidoptera
- Family: Aididae
- Genus: Aidos
- Species: A. perfusa

Binomial name
- Aidos perfusa Schaus, 1905

Synonyms
- Aidos admiranda Schaus, 1912

= Aidos perfusa =

Species of moth

Aidos perfusa is a moth of the Aididae family. It is found from Central America to French Guiana.

== Subspecies ==
- Aidos perfusa perfusa
- Aidos perfusa admiranda Schaus, 1912 (Costa Rica)
