= Aidos osorius =

Scientific classification
- Domain: Eukaryota
- Kingdom: Animalia
- Phylum: Arthropoda
- Class: Insecta
- Order: Lepidoptera
- Family: Aididae
- Genus: Aidos
- Species: A. osorius

Binomial name
- Aidos osorius (Herrich-Schäffer, 1856)

Synonyms
- Brachycodilla osorius Herrich-Schäffer, 1856; Aidos castrensis Schaus, 1896

Species of moth

Aidos osorius is a moth of the family Aididae. It is found in Brazil.
