= Xenarchus admirabilis =

Scientific classification
- Kingdom: Animalia
- Phylum: Arthropoda
- Class: Insecta
- Order: Lepidoptera
- Family: Aididae
- Genus: Xenarchus
- Species: X. admirabilis

Binomial name
- Xenarchus admirabilis (Schaus, 1894)

Synonyms
- Perola admirabilis Schaus, 1894

Species of moth

Xenarchus admirabilis is a moth of the family Aididae. It was described by William Schaus in 1894 and is found in Brazil.
