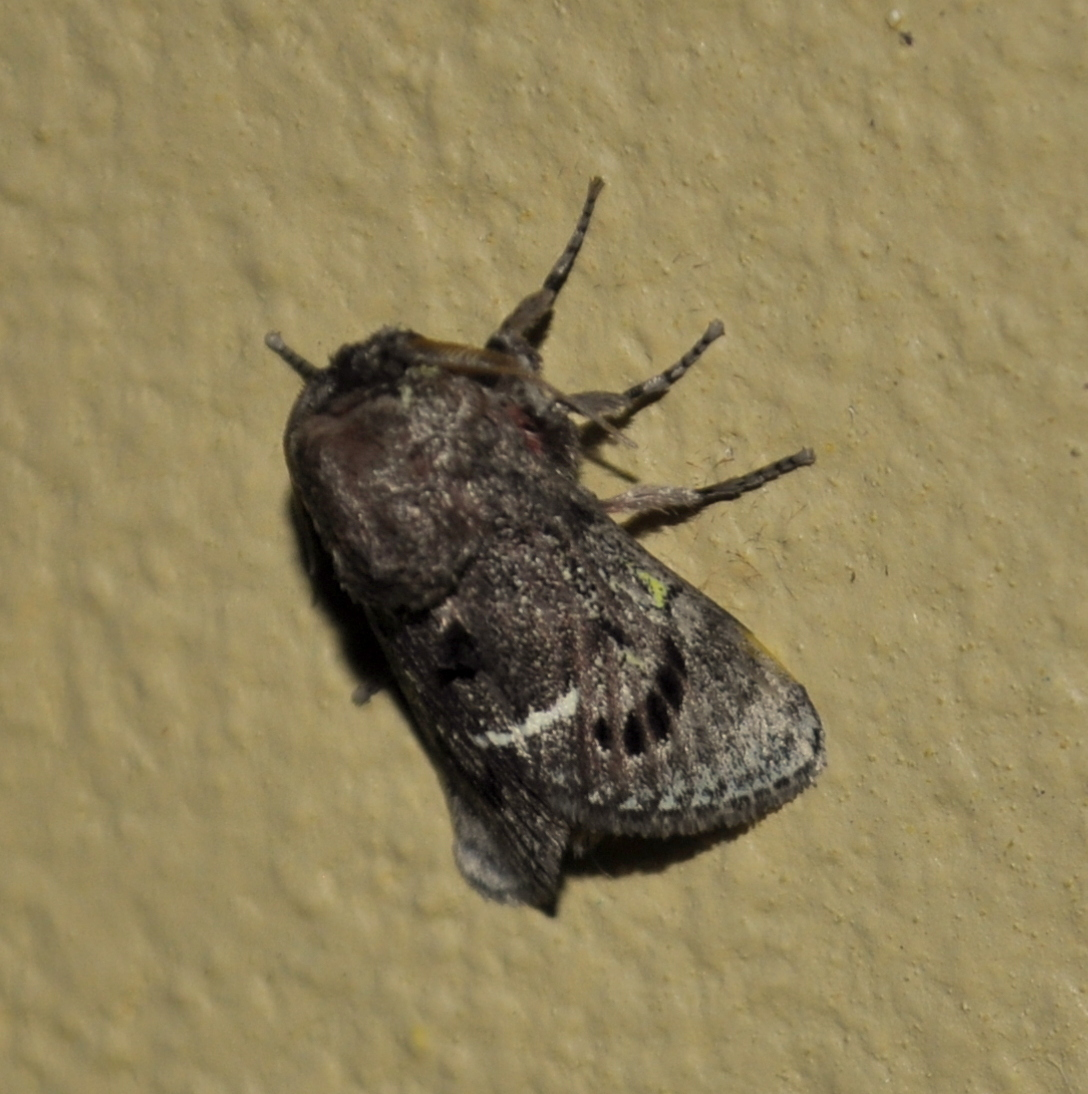

Scientific classification
- Kingdom: Animalia
- Phylum: Arthropoda
- Class: Insecta
- Order: Lepidoptera
- Family: Aididae
- Genus: Xenarchus
- Species: X. carmen

Binomial name
- Xenarchus carmen (Schaus, 1892)

Synonyms
- Talima carmen Schaus, 1892

= Xenarchus carmen =

Species of moth

Xenarchus carmen is a moth of the Aididae family. It is found in Brazil and the Guianas.
