= Arboretum des Grands Murcins =

Private arboretum in Loire, Auvergne-Rhône-Alpes, France

Coordinates: 46.025°N 3.894°E

The Arboretum des Grands Murcins (3 hectares) is a private arboretum located near Arcon, Loire, Auvergne-Rhône-Alpes, France. It is open daily without charge.

The arboretum was created in 1936-1937 by the Friends of Trees and the Savings Bank of Roanne, on an experimental plot of 2 hectares at an altitude of 760 meters. It was restored in the 1980s with the help of the Office National des Forêts, and in 1990 the Loire-Drôme-Ardèche savings bank extended its area to the current size. Today the arboretum contains 226 species, including sequoia, Douglas fir, and other large trees of the American West, as well as Japanese cryptomeria, cedar, American oaks, cherry, and walnut. It is set within a larger forest (150 hectares) with walking paths.

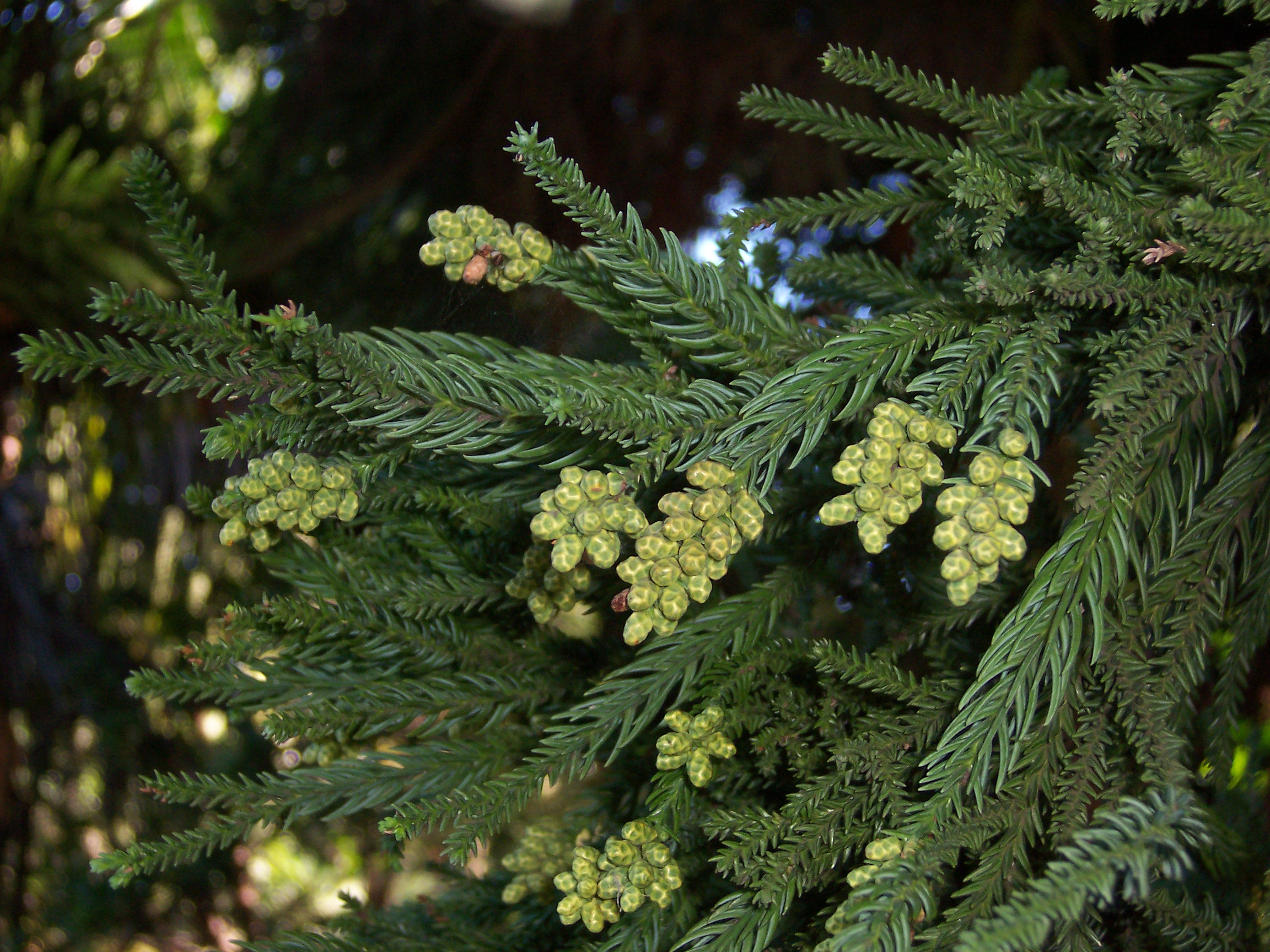
Arboretum des Grands Murcins

== See also ==
- List of botanical gardens in France
