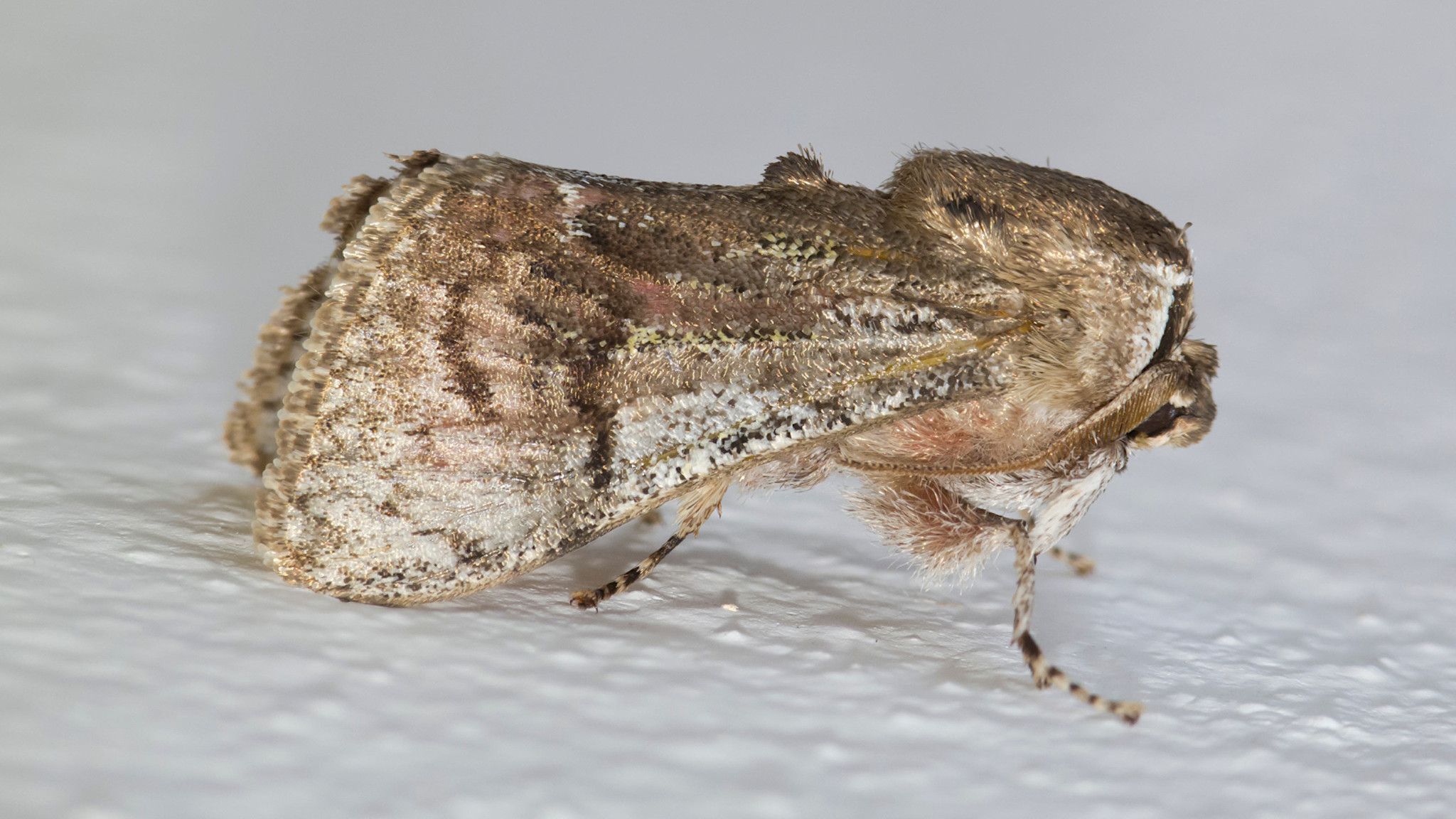

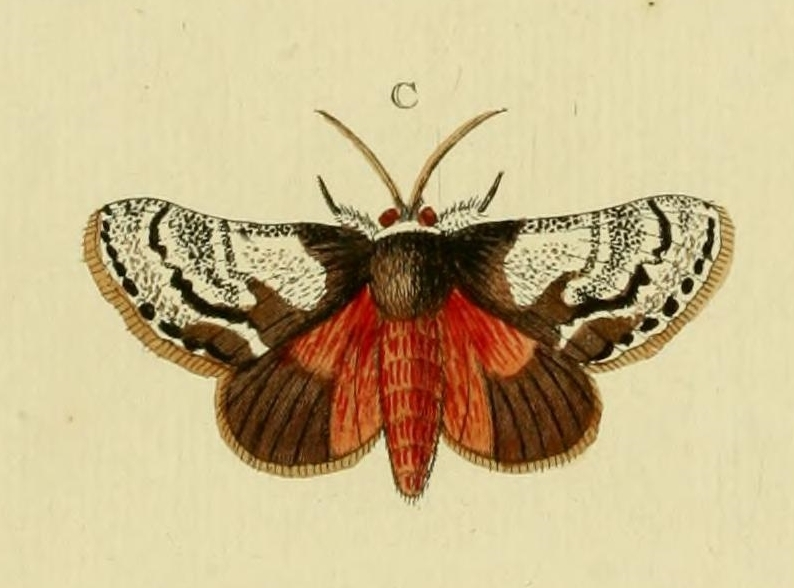

Scientific classification
- Kingdom: Animalia
- Phylum: Arthropoda
- Clade: Pancrustacea
- Class: Insecta
- Order: Lepidoptera
- Family: Aididae
- Genus: Aidos
- Species: A. amanda

Binomial name
- Aidos amanda (Stoll, 1782)

Synonyms
- Bombyx amanda Stoll, 1782

= Aidos amanda =

Species of moth

Aidos amanda is a moth of the Aididae family. It is found in Suriname, Brazil Venezuela and the Guianas.

The larvae feed on the leaves of Annona punicifolia. The larva has seven or eight instars.
