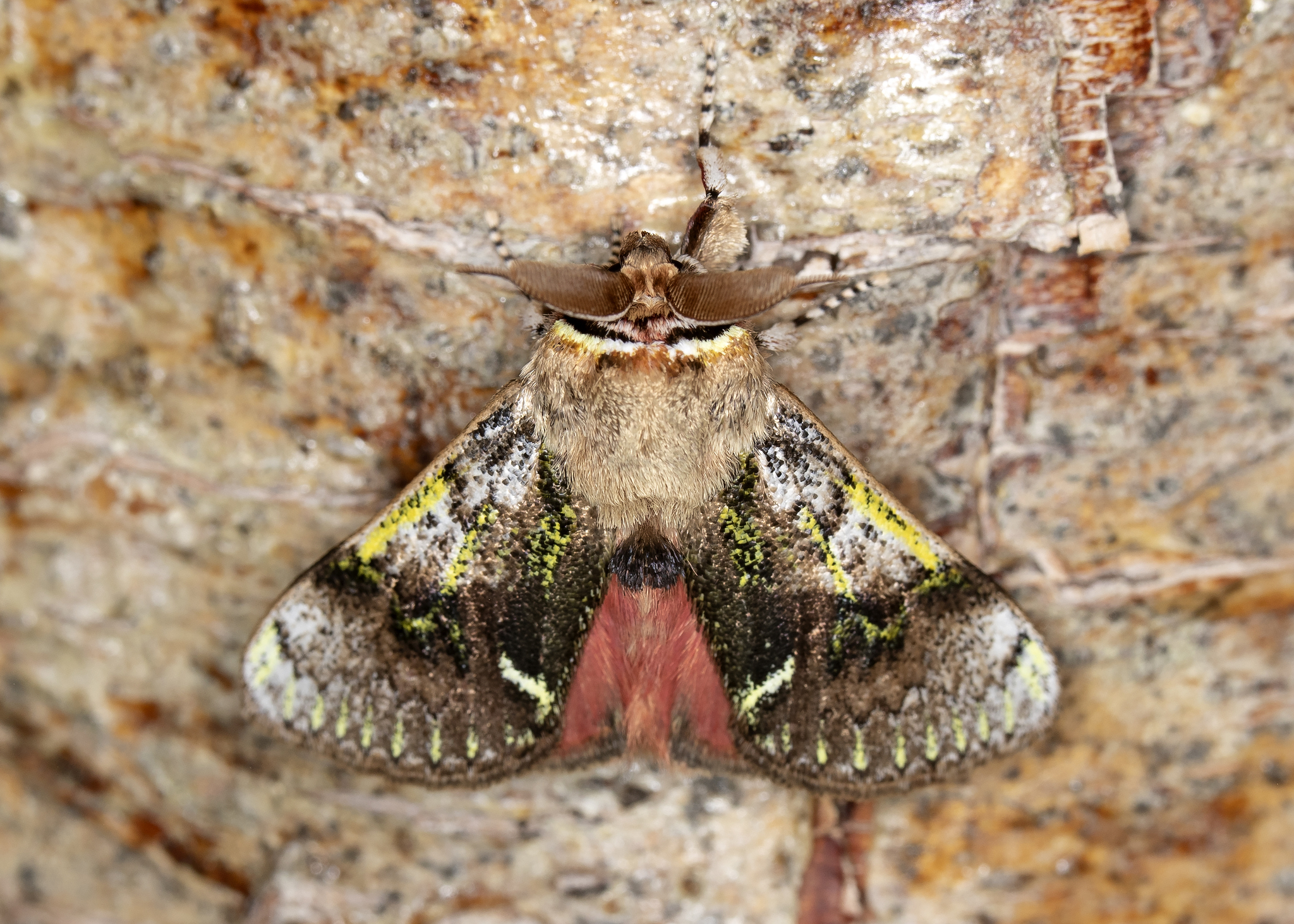
- Aidos yamouna

Scientific classification
- Kingdom: Animalia
- Phylum: Arthropoda
- Clade: Pancrustacea
- Class: Insecta
- Order: Lepidoptera
- Family: Aididae
- Genus: Aidos; Hübner, 1820

Synonyms
- Brachycodion Dyar, 1895

= Aidos (moth) =

Genus of moths

Aidos is a genus of moths of the family Aididae.

== Species ==
- Aidos amanda
- Aidos osorius
- Aidos perfusa
- Aidos yamouna
