= Arcon 2 =

- Birth name: Noel Ram
- Also known as: Leon Mar
- Genres: alternative jazz, drum and bass, and darkcore music
- Occupation: musician

Arcon 2, also known as Leon Mar (born Noel Ram), is a musician best known for his alternative jazz, drum and bass and darkcore music. Mar has been producing dance tracks since 1996. He found his beginning in the jungle community (though his roots lay firmly in hardcore).

Mar released tracks for the 4Hero's Reinforced label, recording such tracks as "Liquid Earth," "Silent Running," and "The Beckoning" under his name and as Arcon 2. Mar was also included on the Reinforced compilation "Above the Law," alongside artists such as Goldie, L Double, and Dillinja.

Leon Mar’s music has been featured on NTS shows such as Open Hand Real Flames, with the track “Running” making its debut on October 30, 2017.

== Discography ==
- Liquid Earth (12") Reinforced Records, 1996
- The Beckoning (12") Reinforced Records, 1996
- Arcon 2 (CD, Album) Reinforced Records, 1997
- Liquid Earth (CD) Sony Music Entertainment (Japan), 1997
- Neut / Shock (12") Reinforced Records, 1997
- The Beckoning EP (CD, Maxi) Sony Music Entertainment (Japan), 1997
- Zorak / 90/90 (12")

=== As Leon Mar ===
- Rezurrection / Passing Phases (12") Creative Wrkz
- Release the Love / Silent Running (12") Reinforced Records, 1996
- Running (12")

=== As Torus ===
- Fuse / Shift (12") Reinforced Records, 1997
- Perspective / Contours (12") Reinforced Records, 1997
- Vibe / Re-Vamp (12") Reinforced Records
