= Archon of Aegeira =

2nd-century BC Greek ambassador

Archon (Ancient Greek: Ἄρχων) of Aegeira was an Achaean statesman of the 2nd century BCE.

Archon was one of those who defended the conduct of the Achaean League with reference to Sparta before Caecilius Metellus in 185. And he was one of the Achaean ambassadors sent to Egypt in 168.

Archon is perhaps the same as the "Archo", the brother of Xenarchus, who was mentioned by Livy.
