= Archon, Aisne =

Archon
- Commune
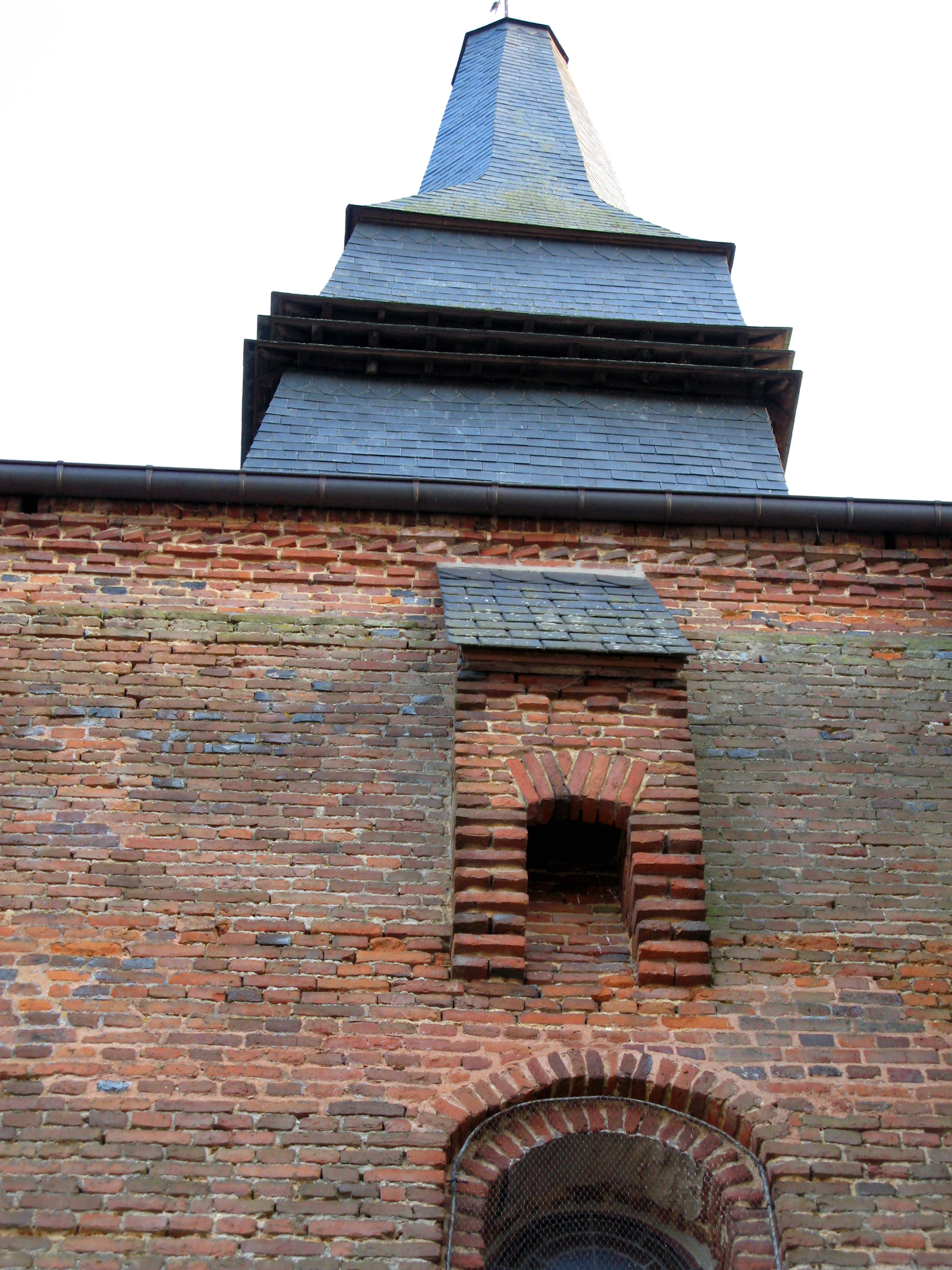
- Fortified church, the gatehouse south facade
- Location of Archon
- Location within France Location within Hauts-de-France
- Coordinates: 49°44′32″N 4°07′09″E
- Country: France
- Region: Hauts-de-France
- Department: Aisne
- Arrondissement: Vervins
- Canton: Vervins
- Intercommunality: Portes de la Thiérache

Government
  - Mayor (2026–32): Nicolas Dufourg
- Area^{1}: 6.37 km^{2} (2.46 sq mi)
- Elevation: 180 m (590 ft)
- Highest elevation: 225 m (738 ft)
- Lowest elevation: 146 m (479 ft)
- Population (2023): 76
  - Density: 12/km^{2} (31/sq mi)
- Time zone: UTC+01:00 (CET)
  - Summer (DST): UTC+02:00 (CEST)
- INSEE/Postal code: 02021 /02360
- ^{1} French Land Register data, which excludes lakes, ponds, glaciers > 1 km^{2} (0.386 sq mi or 247 acres) and river estuaries.

Archon (French pronunciation: [aʁʃɔ̃]) is a commune in the department of Aisne in the Hauts-de-France region of northern France.

== Geography ==
Archon is located some 60 km east by southeast of Saint-Quentin and 40 km west of Charleville-Mézières. It can be accessed by road D744 from Cuiry-les-Iviers in the north which passes through the heart of the commune and the village then continues south to Rozoy-sur-Serre. The D520 road starts from the village and continues east to Parfondeval. The commune consists entirely of farmland, and there are no other villages or hamlets.

A stream rises in the commune and flows south joining other tributaries and feeding the Serre river.

== History ==
In Greek Archon (ἄρχων, pl. Ἄρχοντες) means chief or lord.

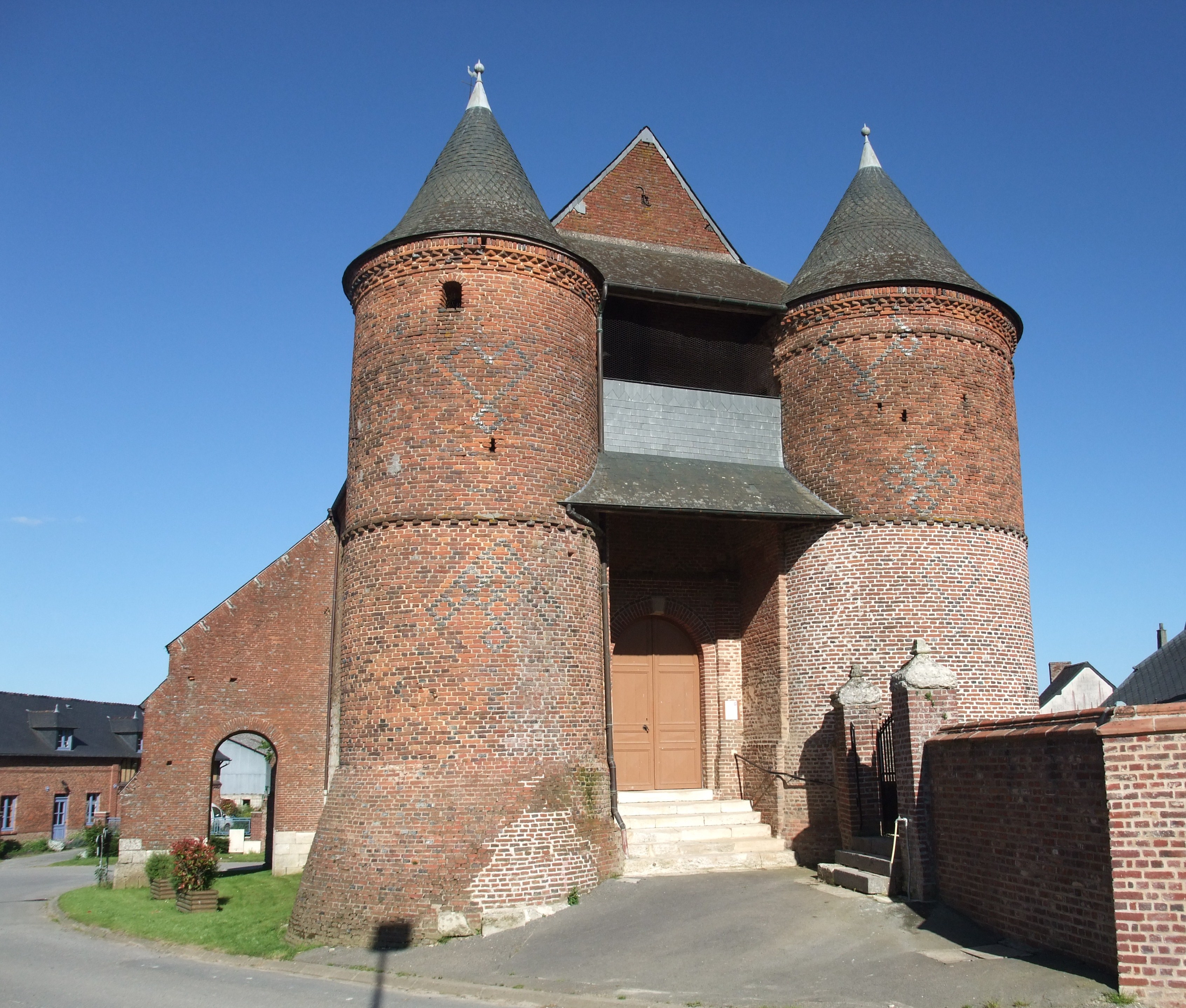
The Archon fortified church and its two towers

Archon was known as Archium in 1124. It has been found in Mousterian flint carvings and Roman pottery. In the 13th century, the lordship was given to the Abbey Saint-Remi of Reims and Saint Vincent of Laon and to the Rozoy Chapter.

The village has beautiful old houses and barns built of Wattle and daub. Archon has a restored private castle – the Ogny Castle – built in the 16th/17th centuries. It is a square building flanked by two towers at opposite corners, a square gate, and two square towers. Former mill at Ogny is now a farm. The church of Saint Martin is fortified. The front is protected by two round towers on each side of the door and connected by a bridge with loopholes and a gatehouse.

Archon was the homeland for:

- Jean d'Ongnies, the Abbot of La Valroy in 1394
- Pierre Antoine Menu (1769-1844) who was born in Archon on 2 November 1769: Knight of the Legion of Honour
- Marcel Cury (1891-1984) local historian, author of the Glossary of Archon, Rozoy-sur-Serre and Parfondeval

Archives

The two oldest civil status acts of Archon show baptisms in the church of St. Martin in late October 1660. The first was a girl, Jeanne Lengrene, the second child of Jacques Cury, brother of Simon Cury and Claude Mennesson. There were baptisms from 1660 to 1668.

Starting from 1668 there were marriages. The first is cited on 3 July 1668 – the marriage of Michel Dugard and Marguerite Lengrene, widower and widow, witnessed by Jean Lengrene and Claude Chollet, labourers, and Louis de Labarre.

The last burial was in January 1669. Antoinette Bouche was buried on 23 January but the precise date of death and age are not known. The witnesses were her children Jacques and François Jumelet which signifies that Antoinette was an adult and the wife of a Jumelet.

Death certificates and marriage are sometimes more informative and go back to the beginning of the 17th century and the late 16th century. Thus on 20 February 1670 Jean Robinet aged about 85 years was buried who must have been born around 1585 in the reign of Henry III.

The study of these documents helps to better trace the history of the population of Archon over 400 years and to better understand the economic and demographic changes in the village. This study is ongoing and relies on the analysis of the following data:

a) The evolution of births, marriages and deaths from 1660 to 2010 (there was a very strong population growth in the First Empire then a very sharp drop from 1850 to 1900)

b) The appearance and disappearance of surnames: Grimpret, Cury, Menu, Marchand, Lefevre were present since at least the middle of the 17th century and Vilain since the beginning of the 18th century until today. Lengrene, Mennesson, Foulon, Taute and others have not been seen in Archon for a long time.

c) Appearances and disappearances of activities (e.g. weaver, farmer, blacksmith, schoolmaster, baker)

Marital status

Registers of deeds, 1660–1699, 1700–1749, 1750–1769, 1770–1789, 1790–1800, 1801–1819 (1808 is missing) 1820–1835, 1836–1842 (reconstituted), 1843–1862, 1863–1892 (missing 1873-1882), a gap from 1893 to 1918 (except 1913, which is reconstituted), 1919–1956, 1957–1976. Tables: 1802-1952

Acts found in late 2010: 1789–1791 acts, 1793 births, Year II, Year III Deaths, Births in Year V, Year VIII Deaths, Year X Births, 2 births in 1807, 1808, 2 deaths in 1819, year 1835.

Population, social economics, Census statistics: Year IV (men over 12 years) from 1836 to 1906, 1926, 1931, 1936, 1954, 1962.

== Administration ==
List of Successive Mayors of Archon

Mayors from the French Revolution to 1941

From	To	Name	Party	Position
1790	1792	Gilles Bailliet		
1792	1800	Nicolas Leroy		
1800	1814	Jean Louis Mathieu		
1814	1816	Jacques Bailliet		
1816	1821	Louis Duguet		
1821	1826	Pierre Quaniaux		
1826	1835	Robert Fleury		
1835	1839	Pierre Antoine Leroy		
1839	1840	Alexandre Marchand		Interim Mayor
1840	1848	Antoine Quaniaux		
1848	1871	Jean-Louis Napoléon Hennequin		
1871	1881	Jules Jean-Louis Quaniaux		
1881	1895	Eugène Carlier		
1895	1900	Bailliet		
1900	1906	Eugène Gosset		
1906	1915	Philidor Villain		
1915	1921	Marchand		
1921	1930	Eugène Catrin		
1930	1931	Jules Férez		
1931	1941	Paul Vasseur		

Mayors from 1941

From	To	Name	Party	Position
1941	1944	Roger Fleury		Named President of the Special Delegation
1944	1946	Paul Vasseur		Elected President of the municipal delegation
1946	1953	Roger Fleury		
1953	1965	Michel Dufourg		
1965	1983	Roger Fleury		
1983	1989	Michel Dufourg		
1989	2008	Alain Dufourg	DVD	
2008	2020	Jean-Luc Villain	MoDem	
2020	Present	Nicolas Dufourg		

== Population ==
Historical population
Year	Pop.	±% p.a.
1968	146	—
1975	128	−1.86%
1982	118	−1.16%
1990	87	−3.74%
1999	83	−0.52%
2007	91	+1.16%
2012	84	−1.59%
2017	87	+0.70%
2023	76	−2.23%
Source: INSEE

== Sites and monuments ==
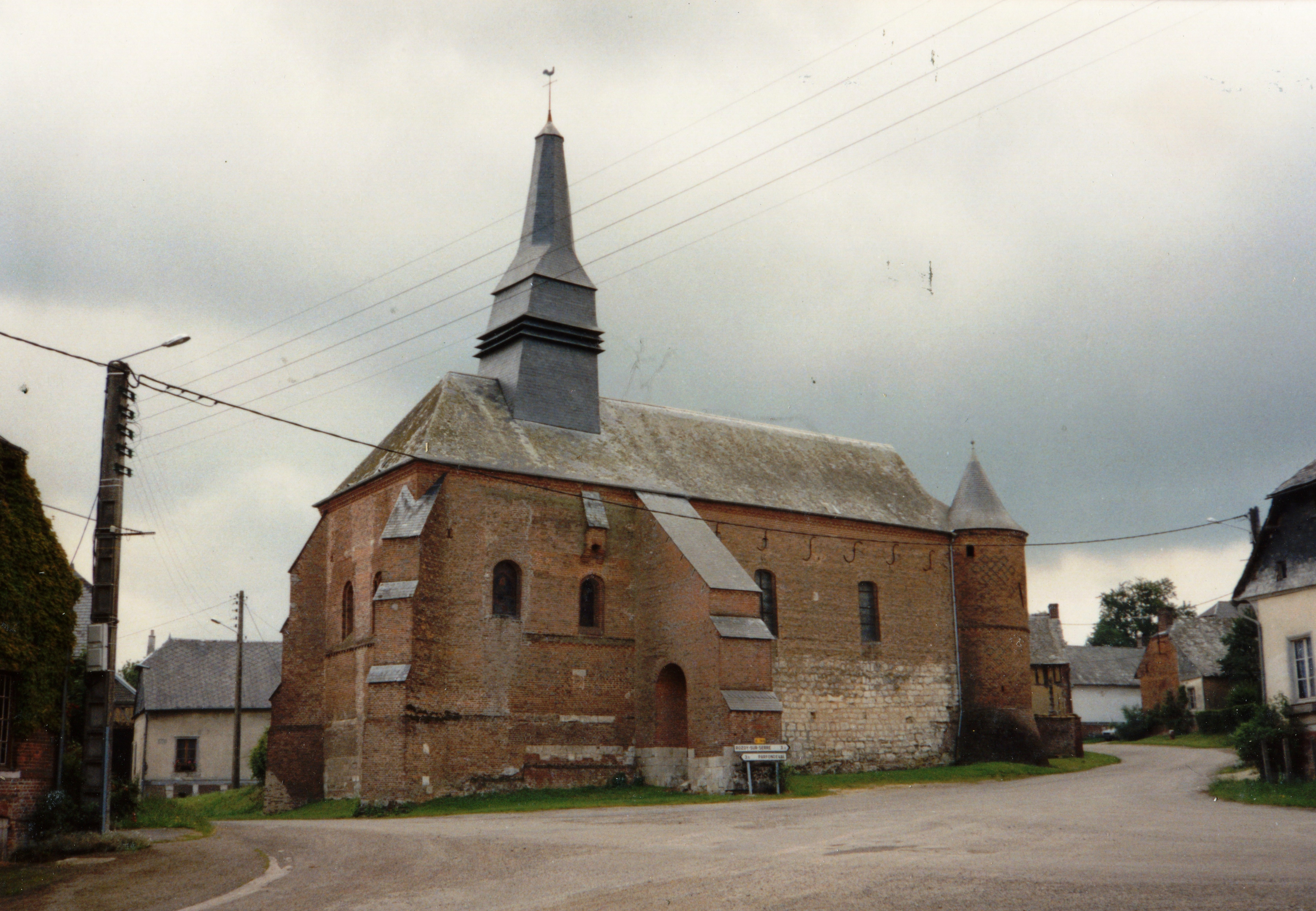
The Church of Saint Martin in 1991

- The Church of Saint Martin (16th century) is registered as a historical monument. It has lost two of the four towers which were originally there. The remaining towers frame the west portal. On the street is the north side which has a massive buttress and is defended by a gatehouse of brick which has a counterpart on the south side overlooking the cemetery. The church has a number of items that are registered as historical objects:
  - A Statue: Saint Martin (19th century)
  - A Statue: Virgin and child (18th century)
  - A set of 2 Sanctuary Lamps (19th century)
  - A Baptismal font (19th century)
  - The complete main Altar (19th century)
  - A set of 2 Processional Banners (19th century)
  - A Sacristy Cross: Christ on the Cross (18th century)
  - An Altar Painting: Calvary, Christ on the Cross (19th century)
  - A Statue: Saint Martin (18th century)
  - A Statuette: Virgin and child (18th century)
- The Sundial from 1820 has a quote from the teacher Prévost: "The glory of the world passes like a shadow"

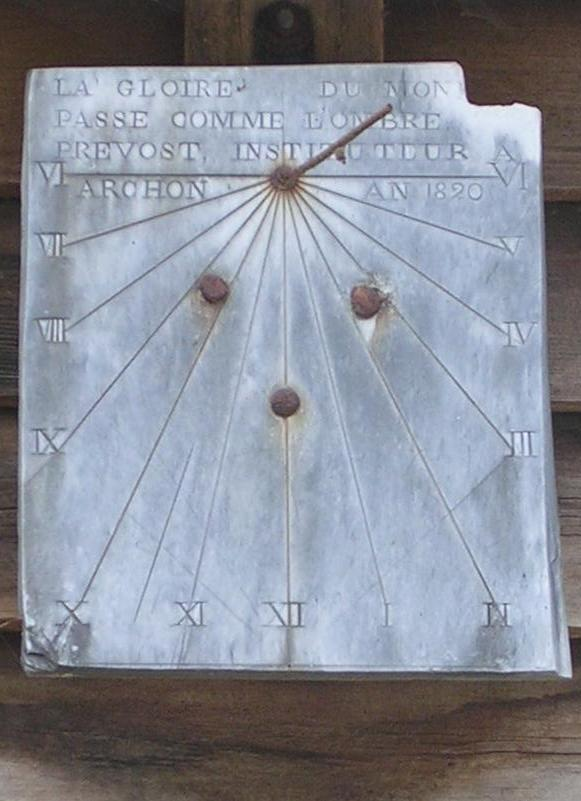
The 1820 Sundial of Archon

== Notable people linked to the commune ==
- Pierre Antoine Menu (1769-1844) Soldier of the Year II at 24 years old. After serving 22 years in Europe, he retired to Beaumé in Thiérache, Captain of infantry and Knight of the Legion of Honour. He was born in the village of Archon on 2 November 1769 into a family of weavers. From 22 April 1793 to 1 September 1815, Pierre Antoine spent his entire military career in the 84th infantry regiment of the line. Wounded by a gunshot in the right nipple on 26 July 1812 at Koukoviaczi near Vitebsk in the Battle of Ostrovno, he left the army at the fall of the Empire. He died at Beaumé on 15 January 1844. His burial stone still exists.
- Marcel Cury (1891-1984), farmer and historian, author with Dr. Georges Railliet of the Glossary of Archon, Rozoy-sur-Serre and Parfondeval and numerous articles including Language of Picardy.

== See also ==
- Communes of the Aisne department

=== Bibliography ===
- The fortified churches of Thiérache, Discovery Guide / Sites of Memory, walks and tours – Coll. Country Side Story Guide – p. 27, ed. Chamina, 2006, size 14 x 21 cm, 48 pages, (selling price 2007: 6 euros), ISBN 2-84466-110-6 (in French)
- Glossary of Archon, Rozoy-sur-Serre and Parfondeval, Marcel Cury and Georges Railliet, Museum of Picardy, Amiens, 1965. With a folding map of the region. Collection of the Linguistics Society Picardy III. Published with The permission of CNRS. Paperback, 107 pages uncut, size 16.5 x 25 cm.
- The Canton of Rozoy-sur-Serre: history, geography, biography, statistics, Isidore Philoximène Mien-Peon, typography and lithography Mourreau Jules, Saint-Quentin 1865
