= Archon (software) =

- Developer(s): University of Illinois at Urbana–Champaign
- Initial release: July 2006
- Final release: 3.21 / 6 July 2011; 13 years ago
- Repository: github.com/archonproject/archon/
- Written in: PHP
- Operating system: Cross-platform
- License: University of Illinois/NCSA Open Source License
- Website: www.archon.org

Archon is an open source platform created by the University of Illinois at Urbana–Champaign which is designed to allow archival repositories to more easily create and publish finding aids to their collections. It was created in response to a lack of easy methods for archivists to publish finding aids online. While the archival community had previously created content and data structures, such as Encoded Archival Description, implementation of these standards was difficult for many in the profession.

The project staff at Archon included Assistant University Archivist and Associate Professor of Library Administration - Chris Prom, Director and Archivist - Scott Schwartz, Lead Developers - Paul Sorensen and Chris Rishel and Developers - Kyle Fox and Mamta Singh.

In 2008, Archon was honoured with the Andrew Mellon Foundation Award for Technology Collaboration.

Beginning in 2009, Archon and Archivists' Toolkit (a similar tool) began the process of merging the two platforms. This new software, ArchivesSpace, was developed in 2012-2013 and had a 1.0 release in September 2013. As of January 2014, Archon became unsupported software and the project was merged with ArchivesSpace.

As of March 2017, Archon continues to have an active user base. LibraryHost continues to provide hosting services for the software and has taken a leadership role in updating the underlying PHP for existing users.
