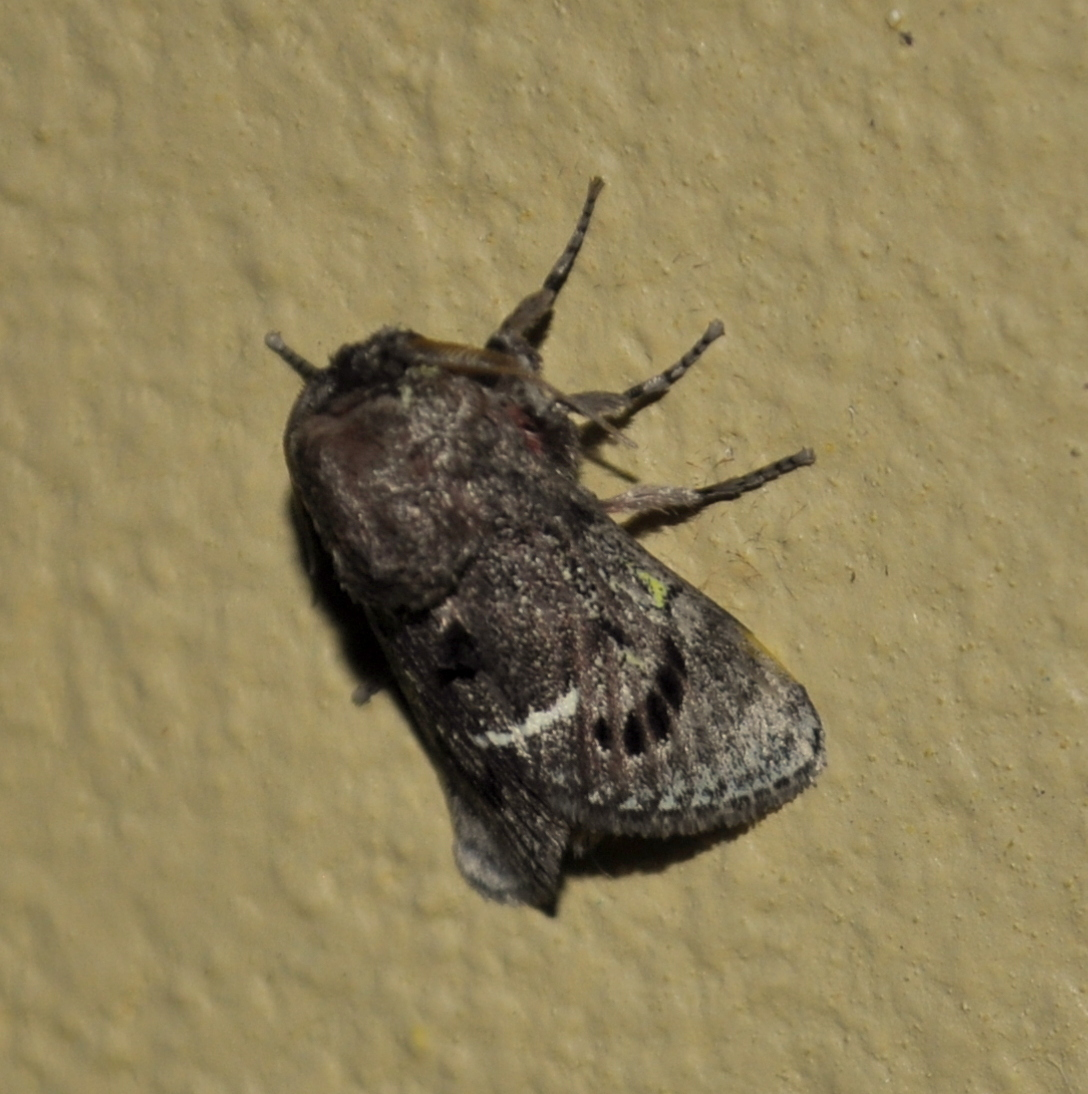
- Xenarchus carmen

Scientific classification
- Kingdom: Animalia
- Phylum: Arthropoda
- Class: Insecta
- Order: Lepidoptera
- Family: Aididae
- Genus: Xenarchus; Herrich-Schäffer, 1855

Synonyms
- Brachycodilla Dyar, 1898

= Xenarchus (moth) =

Genus of moths

Xenarchus is a genus of moths of the family Aididae.

== Species ==
- Xenarchus admirabilis
- Xenarchus carmen
