= Arcon, Loire =

Arcon
- Commune
- Location of Arcon
- Location within France Location within Auvergne-Rhône-Alpes
- Coordinates: 46°00′40″N 3°53′20″E
- Country: France
- Region: Auvergne-Rhône-Alpes
- Department: Loire
- Arrondissement: Roanne
- Canton: Renaison
- Intercommunality: Roannais Agglomération

Government
  - Mayor (2020–2026): Christian Laurent
- Area^{1}: 19.19 km^{2} (7.41 sq mi)
- Elevation: 834 m (2,736 ft)
- Highest elevation: 1,155 m (3,789 ft)
- Lowest elevation: 511 m (1,677 ft)
- Population (2023): 106
  - Density: 5.52/km^{2} (14.3/sq mi)
- Time zone: UTC+01:00 (CET)
  - Summer (DST): UTC+02:00 (CEST)
- INSEE/Postal code: 42008 /42370
- ^{1} French Land Register data, which excludes lakes, ponds, glaciers > 1 km^{2} (0.386 sq mi or 247 acres) and river estuaries.

Arcon (French pronunciation: [aʁkɔ̃]) is a commune in the Loire department in central France.

== Population ==
Historical population
Year	Pop.	±% p.a.
1968	238	—
1975	170	−4.69%
1982	148	−1.96%
1990	135	−1.14%
1999	107	−2.55%
2007	103	−0.48%
2012	105	+0.39%
2017	108	+0.57%
2023	106	−0.31%
Source: INSEE

== Sights ==
- Arboretum des Grands Murcins

== See also ==
- Communes of the Loire department
