= Xenarchus (strategos) =

Xenarchus or Xenarchos (Ancient Greek: Ξέναρχος) was a Greek general of the Achaean League in Ancient Greece who served only for a year from 175–174 BC.

Xenarchus was sent to Rome as an ambassador by the Achaeans, for the purpose of renewing their alliance with the Romans, and of superintending the progress of the negotiations with reference to the Lacedaemonians. He was surprised into affixing his signature to the agreement drawn up on the latter subject at the suggestion of Flamininus. He found means to enter into friendly relations with Perseus of Macedon and it was when he was general of the Achaeans (174 BC), that Perseus got his letter about the runaway slaves of the Achaeans laid before the assembly. His brother Archon was three times strategos in 184/83, 172/71 and 171/70 BC.

Preceded by Kallikrates of Leontion	Strategos of the Achaean League; 175 BC – 174 BC	Succeeded by Archon
