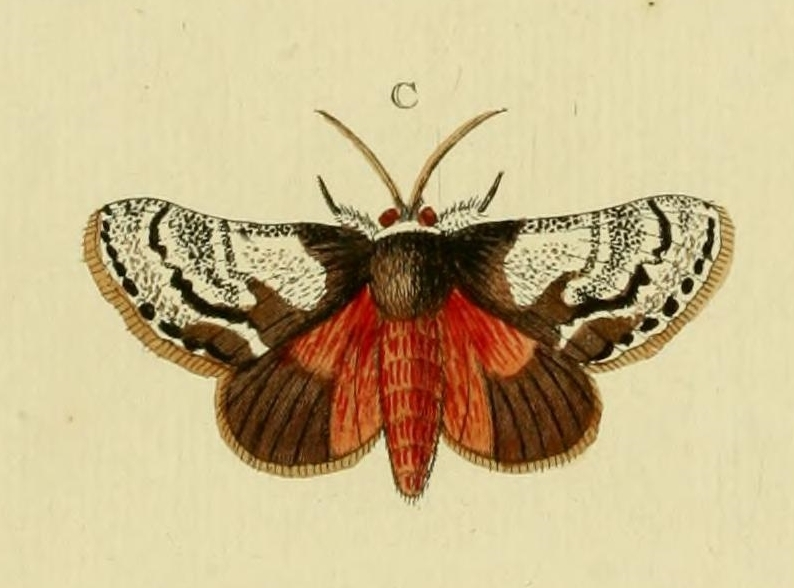
- Aidos amanda

Scientific classification
- Kingdom: Animalia
- Phylum: Arthropoda
- Class: Insecta
- Order: Lepidoptera
- Superfamily: Zygaenoidea
- Family: Aididae

Genera
- Aidos; Xenarchus

= Aididae =

Family of moths

The Aididae are a family of moths in the superfamily Zygaenoidea. Their ranges are in northern South America.
