= Battle of Plataea =

Land battle during the second Persian invasion of Greece (479 BC)

- Part of the Second Persian invasion of Greece
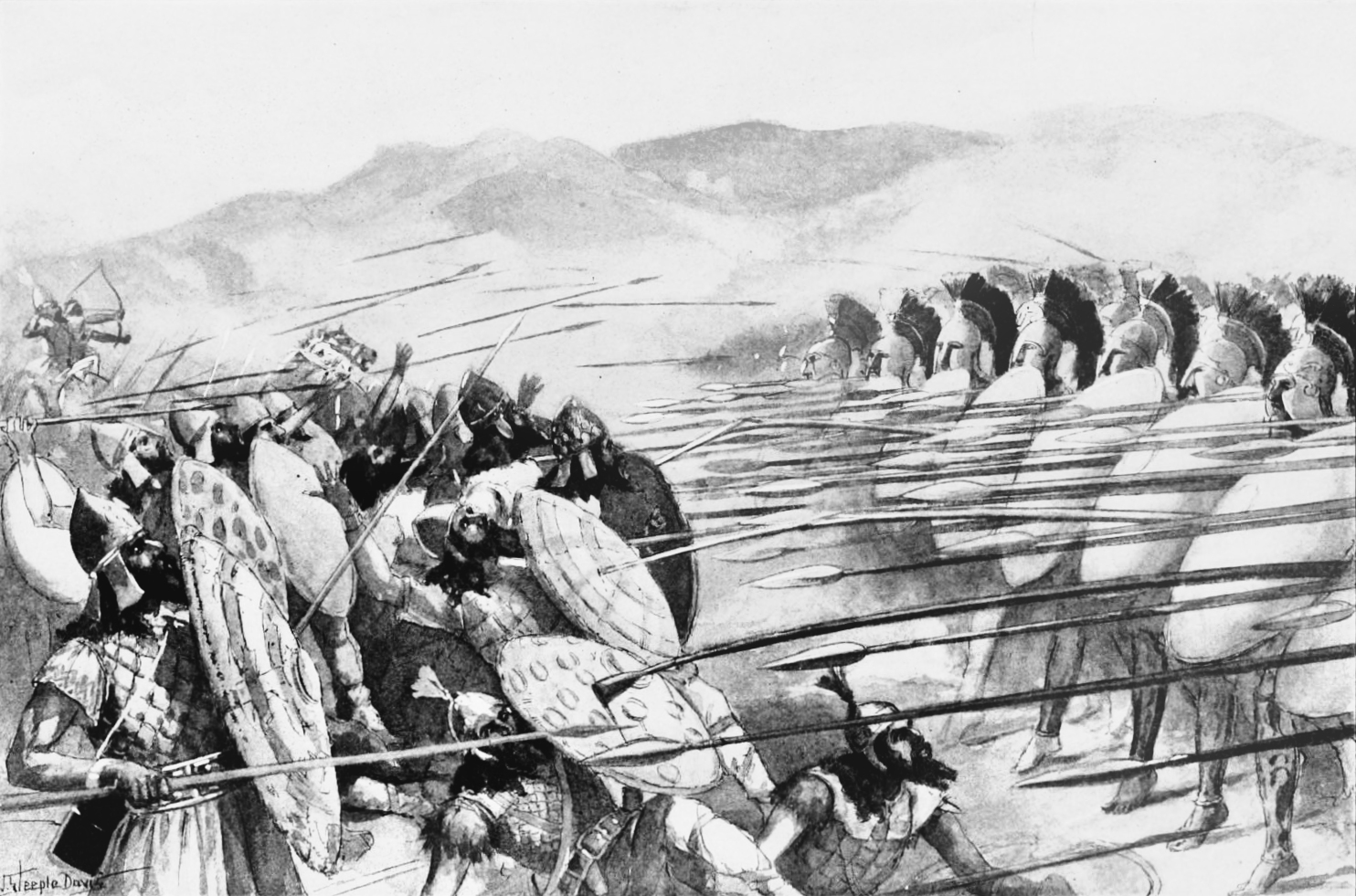
- Persians and Spartans fighting at Plataea. 19th-century illustration.
Date	27 or 28 August, 479 BC
Location	Plataea, (Note: The exact location of the battlefield in the vicinity of Plataea is tough to determine, see Jones 2019.) Greece
Result	Greek victory
Territorial changes	Persians lose control of Attica and Boeotia and retreat from Greece

Belligerents
Sparta; Athens; Corinth; Tegea; Megara; Plataea; Other Greek city-states	Achaemenid Empire Greek vassals: • Boeotia • Thessaly • Macedon

Commanders and leaders
Pausanias; Amompharetus †; Aristodemus †; Callicrates †; Euryanax; Aristides; Olympiodoros; Arimnestos	Mardonius †; Hegesistratus; Masistius †; Artabazos

Strength
c. 75,000–85,000 (modern consensus)	300,000 (Herodotus) plus 50,000 (estimation by Herodotus) Greek allies; 500,000 (Diodorus); 70,000–120,000 (modern consensus)

Casualties and losses
10,000+ (Ephorus and Diodorus); 1,360 (Plutarch); 159 (Herodotus)	257,000 (Herodotus); 100,000 (Diodorus); 50,000–90,000 (modern consensus)

The Battle of Plataea was the final land battle during the second Persian invasion of Greece. It took place in August 479 BC near the city of Plataea in Boeotia, and was fought between an Achaemenid army led by Mardonius (allied with Boeotia, Thessaly, and Macedon) and the Spartan-led Hellenic alliance including Athens, Corinth, Tegea, Megara and other city-states.

At the preceding Battle of Salamis, the allied Greek navy had won an unlikely but decisive victory, preventing the conquest of the Peloponnese region. Xerxes then retreated with much of his army, leaving his general Mardonius to finish off the Greeks the following year. In the summer of 479 BC, the Greeks assembled a huge army and marched out of the Peloponnese. The Persians retreated to Boeotia and built a fortified camp near Plataea. The Greeks, however, refused to be drawn into the prime terrain for cavalry around the Persian camp, resulting in a stalemate that lasted eleven days. (Note: The historian Detlev Fehling argues that the recurring ten-day periods, usage of multiples of 11 for any quantities, and the consistently repeated number of 300 for the size of small groups, were arbitrary insertions by Herodotus in his narrative.)

While attempting a retreat after their supply lines were disrupted, the Greek battle line fragmented. Thinking that the Greeks were in full retreat, Mardonius ordered his forces to pursue them, but the Greeks, particularly the Spartans, Tegeans and Athenians halted and gave battle, routing the lightly armed Persian infantry and killing Mardonius. A large portion of the Persian army was trapped in its camp and killed. The destruction of this army, and the remnants of the Persian navy allegedly on the same day at the Battle of Mycale, decisively ended the invasion.

== Background ==
The Achaemenid Emperor Xerxes I, after his accession in 486 BCE, quickly initiated his preparations for an invasion of Greece, including the task of building two pontoon bridges across the Hellespont. A congress of city states met, probably at Corinth, in 481 BC, and a confederate alliance of Greek city-states was formed, generally referred to as the Allies.

In August 480 BC, after hearing of Xerxes' approach, a small Allied army led by Spartan King Leonidas I blocked the pass of Thermopylae. Famously, the massively outnumbered Greek army held Thermopylae for three days before being outflanked by the Persians, who used a little-known mountain path. Following Thermopylae, the Persian army proceeded to burn and sack Plataea and Thespiae, the Boeotian cities that had not surrendered, before taking possession of the now-evacuated city of Athens. The Allied army, meanwhile, prepared to defend the Isthmus of Corinth. The ensuing naval Battle of Salamis in 480 BC ended in a decisive victory for the Allies, marking a turning point in the conflict. Following the defeat of his navy at Salamis, Xerxes retreated to Sardis with a minor portion of his army.

A map showing the Greek world at the time of the battle.

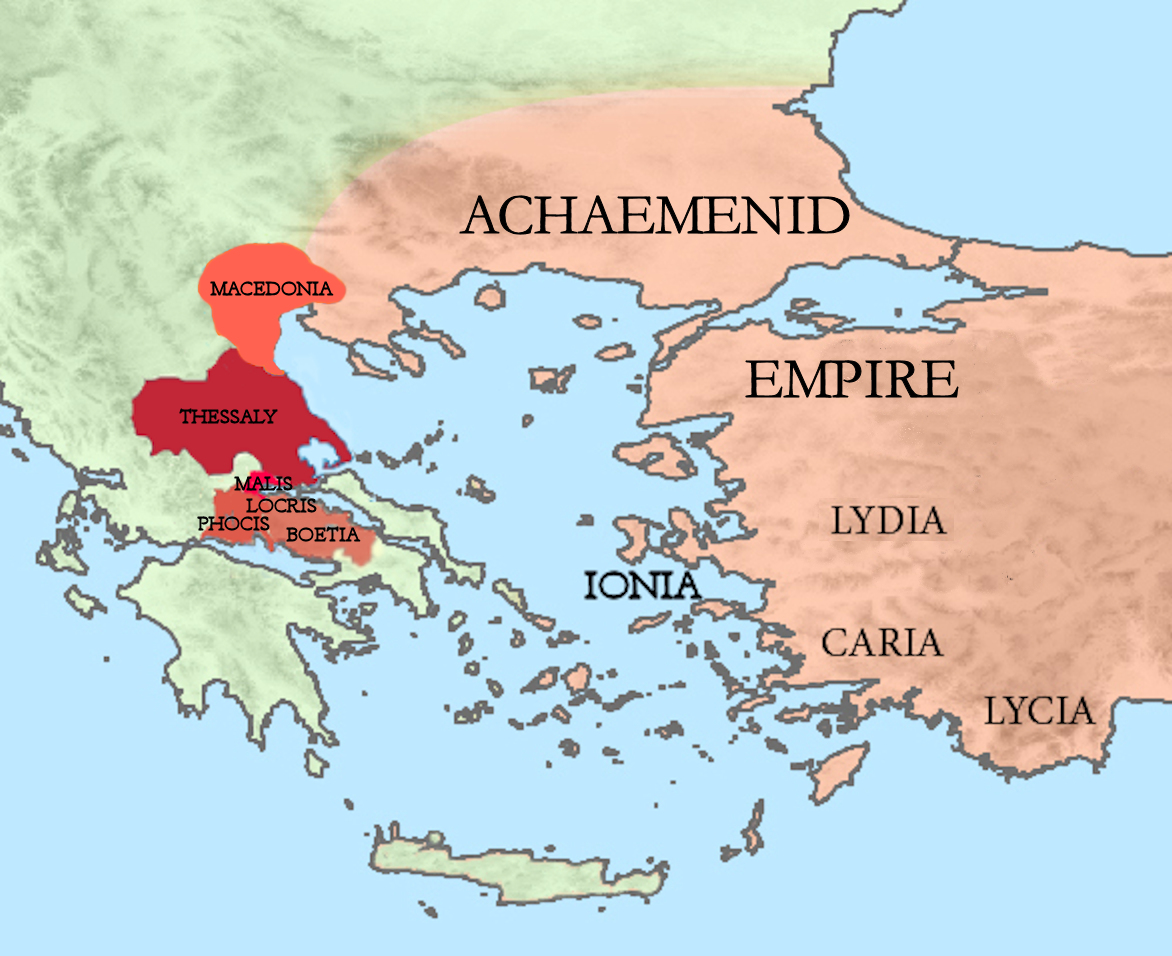
The Achaemenid Empire and its allied Greek states: Macedonia, Thessaly, Malis, Locris, Phocis and Boeotia; at the time of the Battle of Plataea.

Xerxes left Mardonius in charge of his troops. Mardonius decided to spend the winter in Thessaly. Mardonius tried to win over the Athenians through the mediation of Alexander I of Macedon. Upon their refusal, the Persians marched south again. Athens was again evacuated and left to the enemy, leading to the second phase of the Destruction of Athens. Mardonius now repeated his offer of peace to the Athenian refugees in Salamis. Athens sent emissaries to Sparta demanding assistance, and threatened to accept the Persian terms if it was not provided. These events occurred sometime in the month of June. According to Herodotus, the Spartans were at that time celebrating the festival of Hyacinthus, and delayed making a decision for ten days, until they were persuaded of the danger to all of Greece if the Athenians surrendered. (Note: The historian George Cawkwell argues that the Spartans had delayed committing their troops not due to religious obligations, but because they were worried about a potential revolt by the helots.) When the Athenian envoys went to the Spartan ephors to deliver an ultimatum, they were told by the ephors that their army had already departed. The 5,000 Spartiates had advanced up the Eurotas River and were now in Oresthasium.

== Order of battle ==
=== Greeks ===
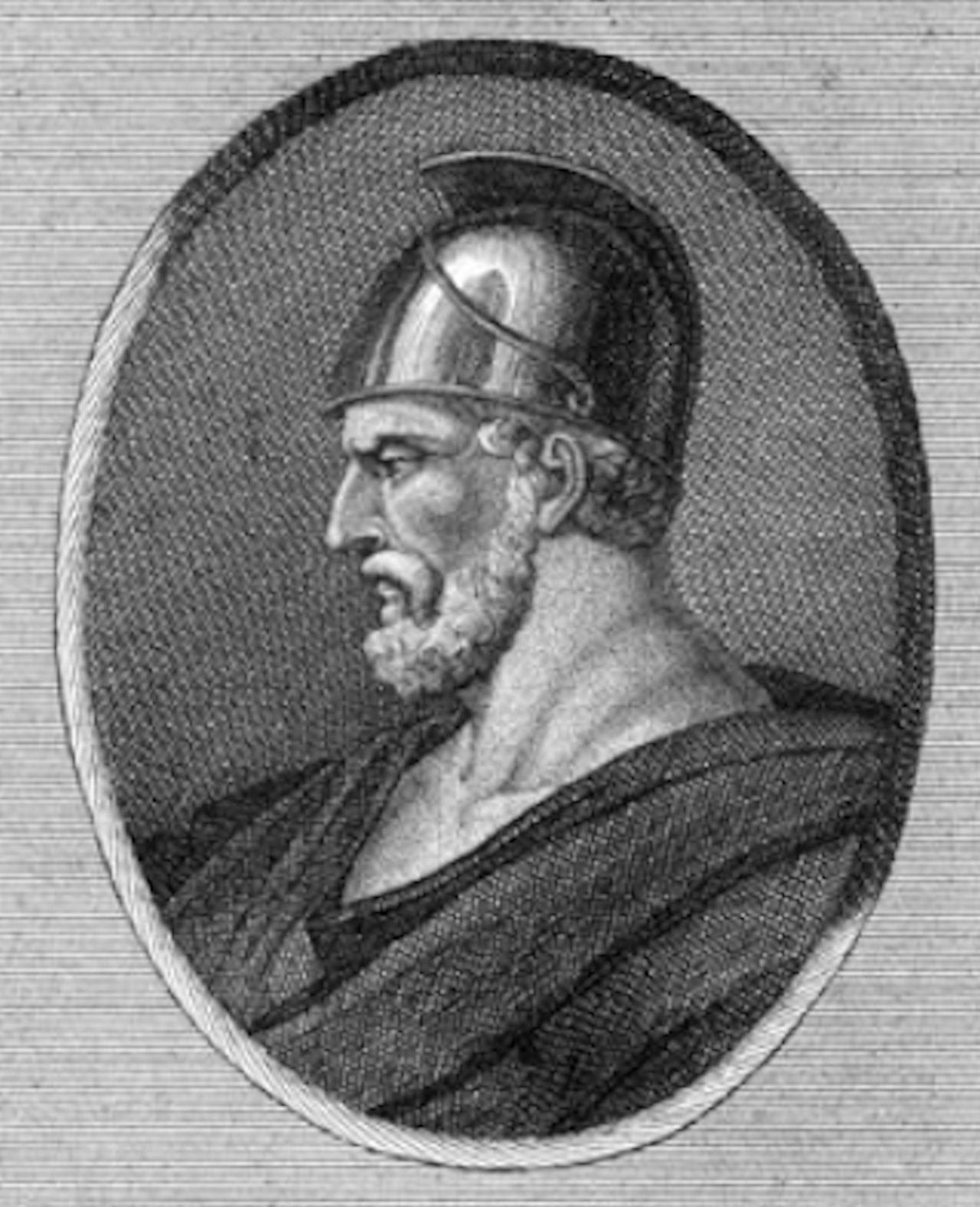
The Spartan general Pausanias commanded the Allied Greek troops.

According to Herodotus, the Spartans sent 45,000 men – 5,000 Spartiates (full citizen soldiers), (Note: The historian Marcello Lupi observes that these 5,000 Spartiates were neotes, Spartan youth between the ages of 20 and 45.) 5,000 other Lacodaemonian hoplites (perioeci) and 35,000 helots (seven per Spartiate). Pausanias, the regent for his cousin Pleistarchus, was chosen to command the Spartan troops. The historian Ian Macgregor-Morris argues that the 5,000 Spartiates sent to Plataea were 3/5th of Sparta's troops, while the historian Hans van Wees argues that these 5,000 were all the Spartan citizens fit to serve at the time. The Spartan troops at Plataea might have been the largest army the Spartans had sent beyond the Isthmus of Corinth. Pausanias chose Euryanax to be his deputy commander. Each phyle of the Athenians had its own strategos (commander).

The historian Nicholas Sekunda argues that Herodotus had assumed that each Greek hoplite was accompanied by a lightly armed attendant from the ranks of the psiloi, which had led to Herodotus inflating his numbers for the allied Greek army to 110,000. Sekunda argues that these attendants were present in the Greek camp but not on the battlefield. He further argues that these attendants served as skeuphoros (baggage carriers), and were either slaves or the relatives of the hoplites who were too young to serve in the military. In addition to the 35,000 helots, there were also 34,000 light infantry soldiers in the Greek camp. Other than the state of Argos, Mantinea and Elis also did not send their troops. The historian Paul A. Rahe estimates that these two states could have sent 6,000 hoplites, and argues that they did not because of Mardonius' bribes.

City	Number of hoplites	City	Number of hoplites	City	Number of hoplites
Sparta	10,000	Athens	8,000	Corinth	5,000
Megara	3,000	Sicyon	3,000	Tegea	1,500
Phlius	1,000	Troezen	1,000	Anactorion & Leukas	800
Epidaurus	800	Arcadian Orchomenans, Arcadians	600	Eretria & Styra	600
Plataea	600	Aegina	500	Ambracia	500
Chalcis	400	Mycenae & Tiryns	400	Hermione	300
Potidaea	300	Cephalonia	200	Lepreum	200
Source: Rahe 2015, p. 309				Total	38,700

=== Achaemenids ===
Main Achaemenid troops under Mardonius

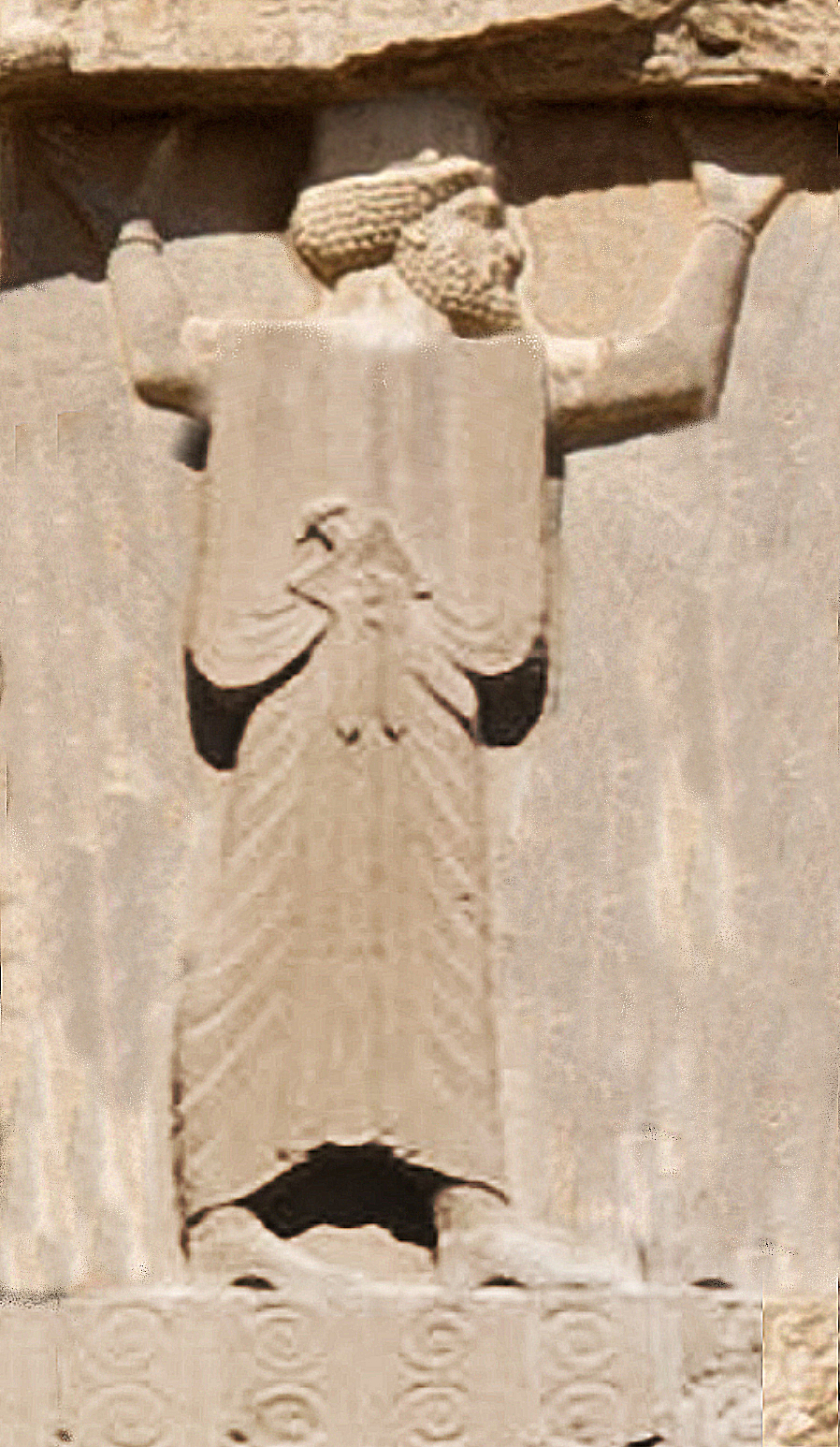
Persians

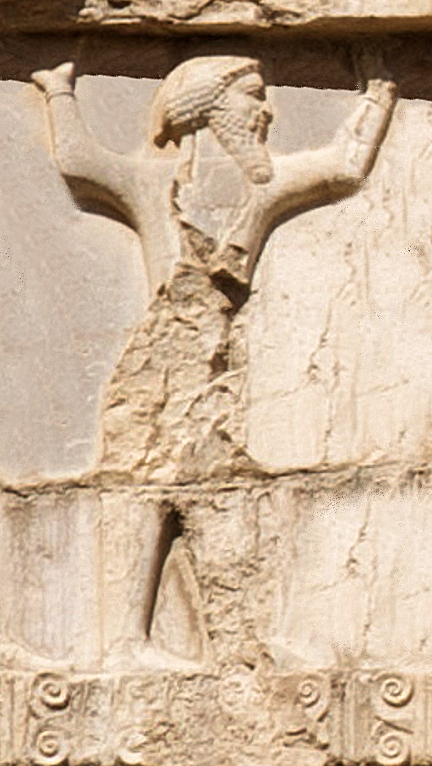
Medians

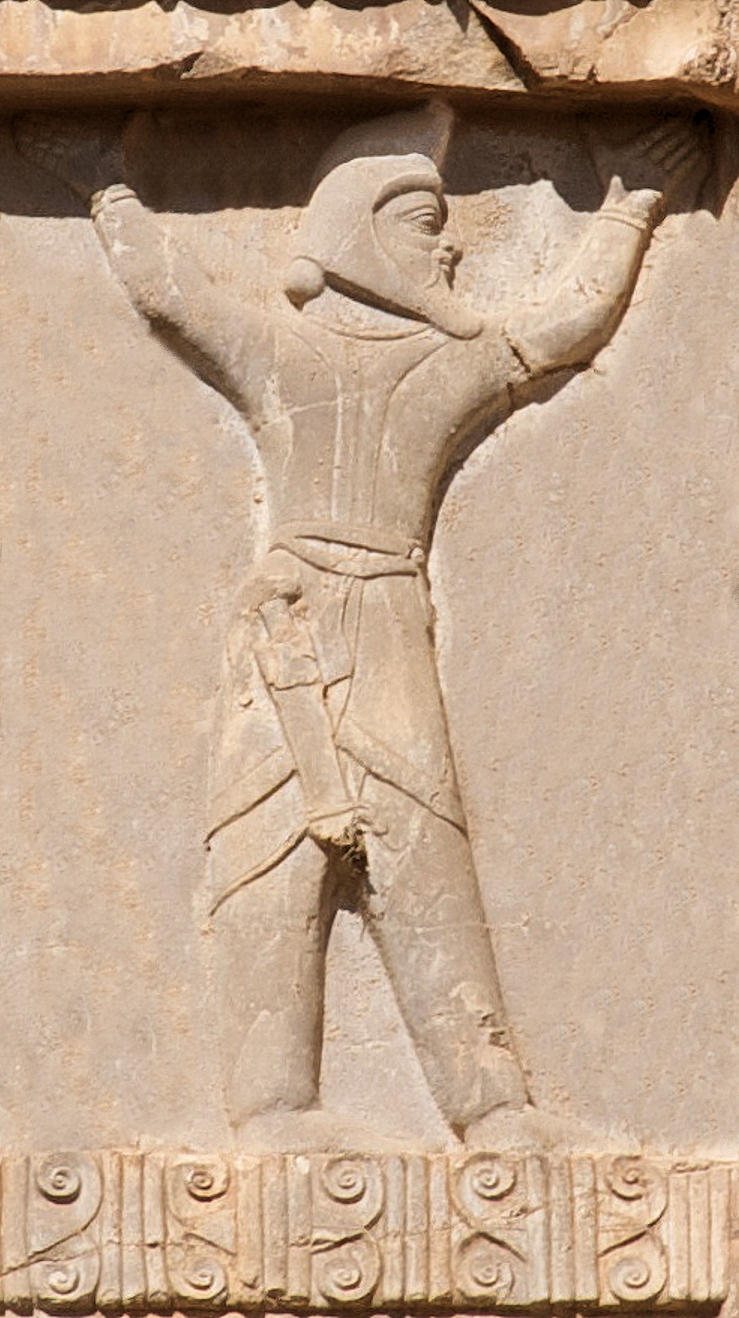
Sakas

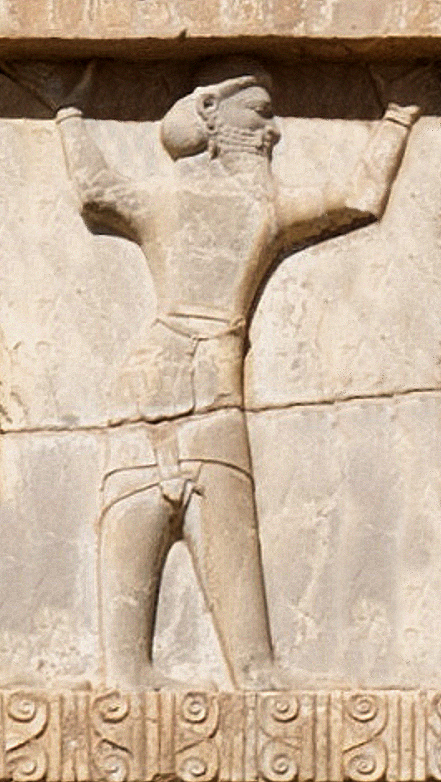
Bactrians

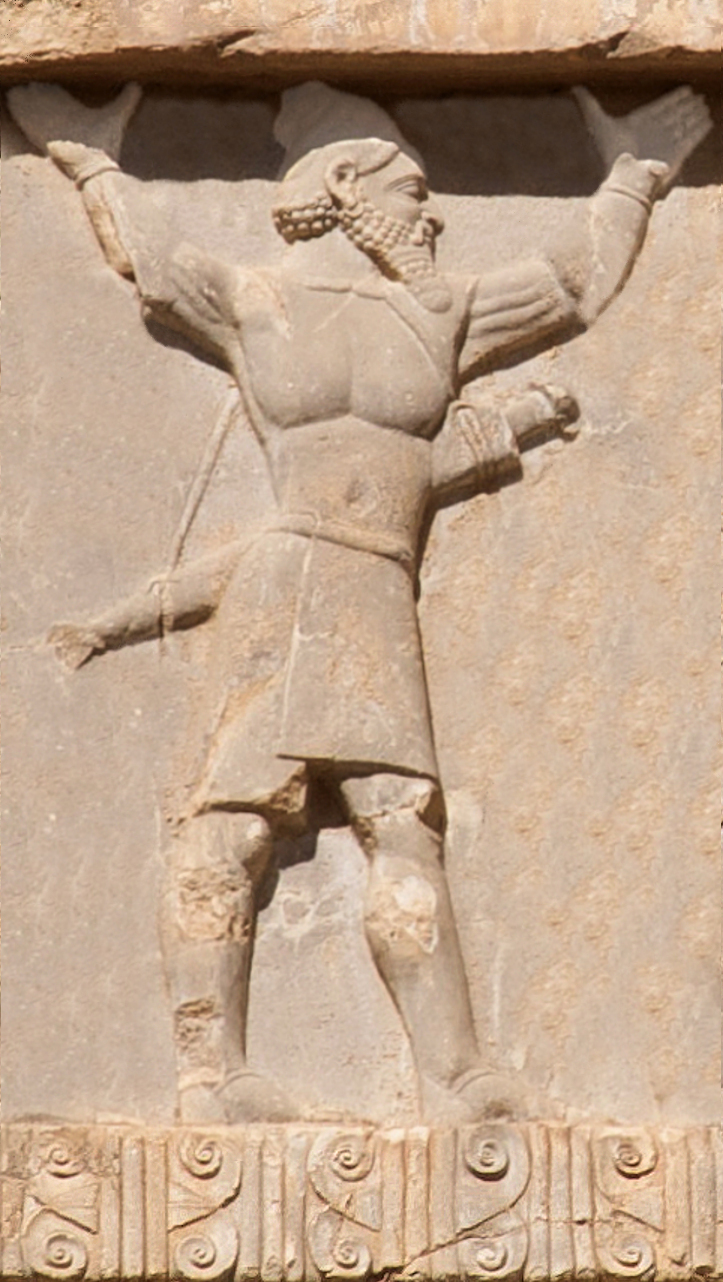
Indians

Main troops of Achaemenid general Mardonius, according to Herodotus: Persians, Medians, Sakas, Bactrians and Indians, illustrated in the list of troops by ethnicity, on the tomb of Xerxes I at Naqsh-e Rostam.

The historian John Francis Lazenby, by comparing the size of the Persian camp to later Roman military camps, calculates the number of troops at 70,000, including 10,000 cavalry. The historian Peter Connolly arrives at a potential total of 120,000 from the size of the camp. Most estimates for the total Persian force are generally in this range. The historian Hans Delbrück, basing his calculations on the distance the Persians marched in a day when Athens was attacked, concluded that 75,000 was the upper limit for the size of the Persian army, including the supply personnel and other non-combatants. Delbrück estimated that the Persian army, including the allied Greeks, totaled 40,000. Konecny estimates that the Persians had around 55,000 to 70,000 infantry, and their camps had anywhere from 120,000 to 150,000 people including the camp followers. Thorax of Larissa and his brothers Eurypylus and Thrasydeius, from the Aleuadae family, were with Mardonius at Plataea.

Nations under the Achaemenids at Plataea	Number
Persians	40,000
Bactrians, Indians, Sakae	20,000
Greek allies: Boeotians (Thebans), Locrians, Malians, Thessalians, Phocians (1000 men), Macedonians	20,000
Phrygians, Thracians, Mysians, Paeonians, Ethiopians, Egyptians	Smaller contingents
Cavalry: Persians, Bactrians, Indians, Sakae	5,000
Total	100,000

=== Composition and order of battle ===
The details of the arrangement of the Persian line were given by Herodotus. The Persians were on the left wing, facing the 11,500 Lacedaemonian and Tegean hoplites. Konecny estimates that these Persians on the left wing numbered around 20,000 to 30,000. To the right of the Persians were the Medes, facing the 6,200 soldiers of Corinth, Potidaea, Orchomenus and Sicyon. Konecny estimates that these Medes numbered around 12,000 to 18,000.

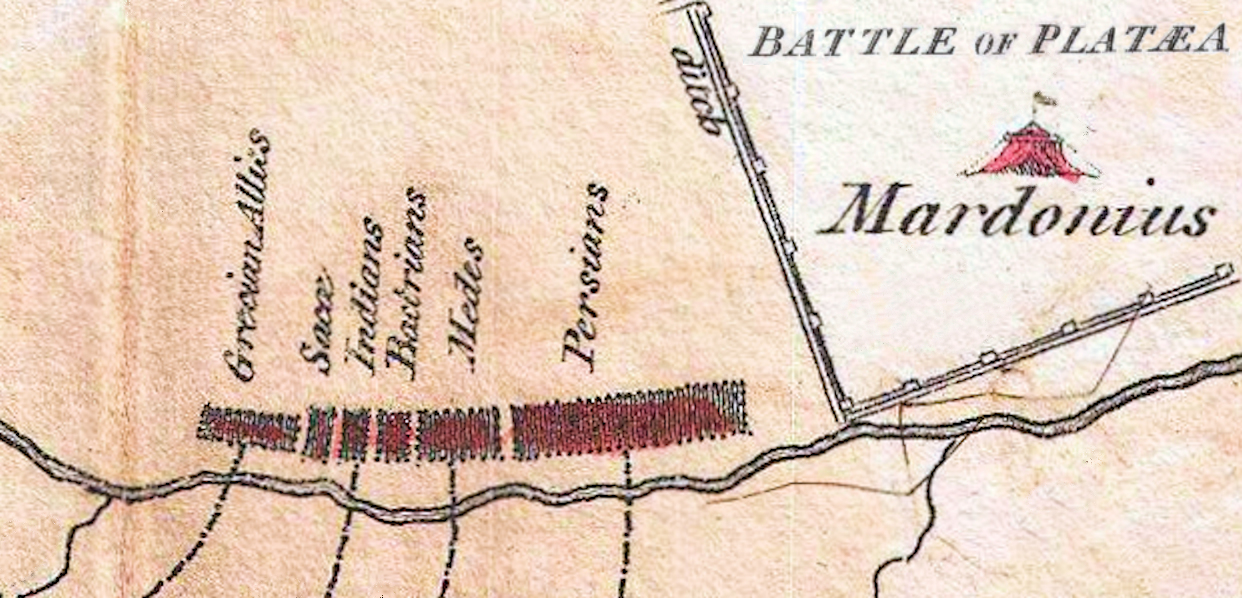
Disposition of Achaemenid troops beyond the Asopos river at the beginning of the Battle of Plataea. From left to right: Greek allies, Sacae, Indians, Bactrians, Medes and Persians.

Next to the Medes, the Bactrians were deployed in front of the 3,400 soldiers of Epidaurus, Troezen, Lepreum, Tiryns, Mycenae, and Phlius. Konecny estimates that these Bactrians totaled around 6,000 to 9,000. After the Bactrians were the Indians and Sacae, opposite the 3,300 soldiers of Hermione, Eretria, Styra, Chalcis, Anaktoria, Leucadia, Palea, and Aegina. Konecny estimates that these Indians and Sace totaled around 6,000 to 9,000. The Medes, Bactrians, Indians and Sacae formed the center of the Persian line, numbering around 24,000 to 36,000. Against the 11,600 Athenians, Plataeans and Megarians, were deployed the Boeotians, Locrians, Malians, Thessalians, and the Phocians. Konecny estimates that these troops numbered around 11,000 to 13,000. Thus Konecny estimates that the total Persian infantry numbered around 44,000 to 66,000; and the Persian cavalry around 5,000 to 7,000.

== Logistics and finance ==
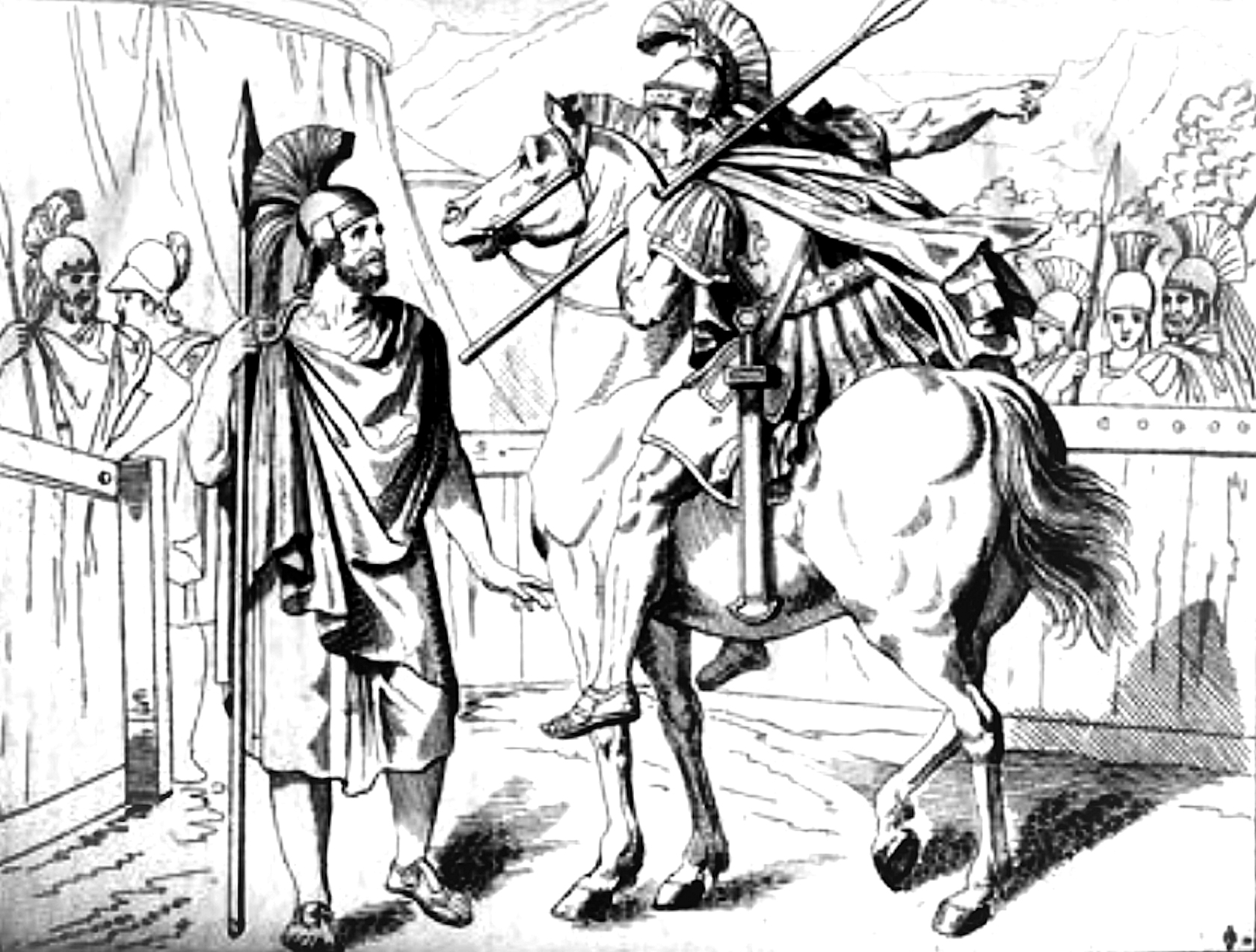
Aristides, commander of the Athenians, receives Alexander I of Macedon (a nominal ally of the Achaemenids) on the night before the battle.

Andreas Konecny estimates that the Greek supply train destroyed by the Persian cavalry had 120 tons of supplies. He estimates that the Greek army at Plataea had a total of 78,000 soldiers and that these supplies would last for two days if each soldier were to receive one choinix of rations per day, equivalent to 800 grams (1.8 lb). Konecny estimates that each column had to travel 75 kilometres (47 mi) one way, and argues that there were three supply columns in transit at all times in order to supply the Greek army. He argues that at least 500 people accompanied each column. He therefore says that a minimum of 2,000 auxiliaries must have arrived at the Greek camp in the four columns which had already supplied them. Konecny says that at least 1,500 auxiliaries were always working the supply lines.

The historian Nicholas Sekunda argues that the animals in the supply column were pack animals and not oxen, and says that the Persians could only use pack animals after the attack, since oxen could not traverse the unpaved route. Sekunda estimates that the food provisions were at least one choinix per day for both the Greek and Persian soldiers. Sekunda also estimates that the supply column disrupted by the Persians had either 58,000 choinikes of barley or 47,000 choinikes of wheat, half the daily provisions for the 110,000 people in the Greek camp, including the non-combatants.

Sekunda argues that the Greeks had a "common treasury". He cites Plutarch's statement, which says that during the Spartan command of the allied Greeks, the latter paid some type of contribution. The historian Peter Brunt argues that such a treasury could not have existed. Sekunda argues that the Spartans might have had enough time to make financial provisions during the Persian invasions. Based on his estimates for the daily provisions requirements, Sekunda estimates that the daily spending on rations by the Greeks at 10,000 drachmas. He argues that the allied Greeks could have arranged such sums. Sekunda observes that the battle of Plataea was the first instance of a Greek army receiving supplies while encamped on the battlefield, instead of living off the land, getting supplies from allied polities on their route or buying from markets set up by camp followers.

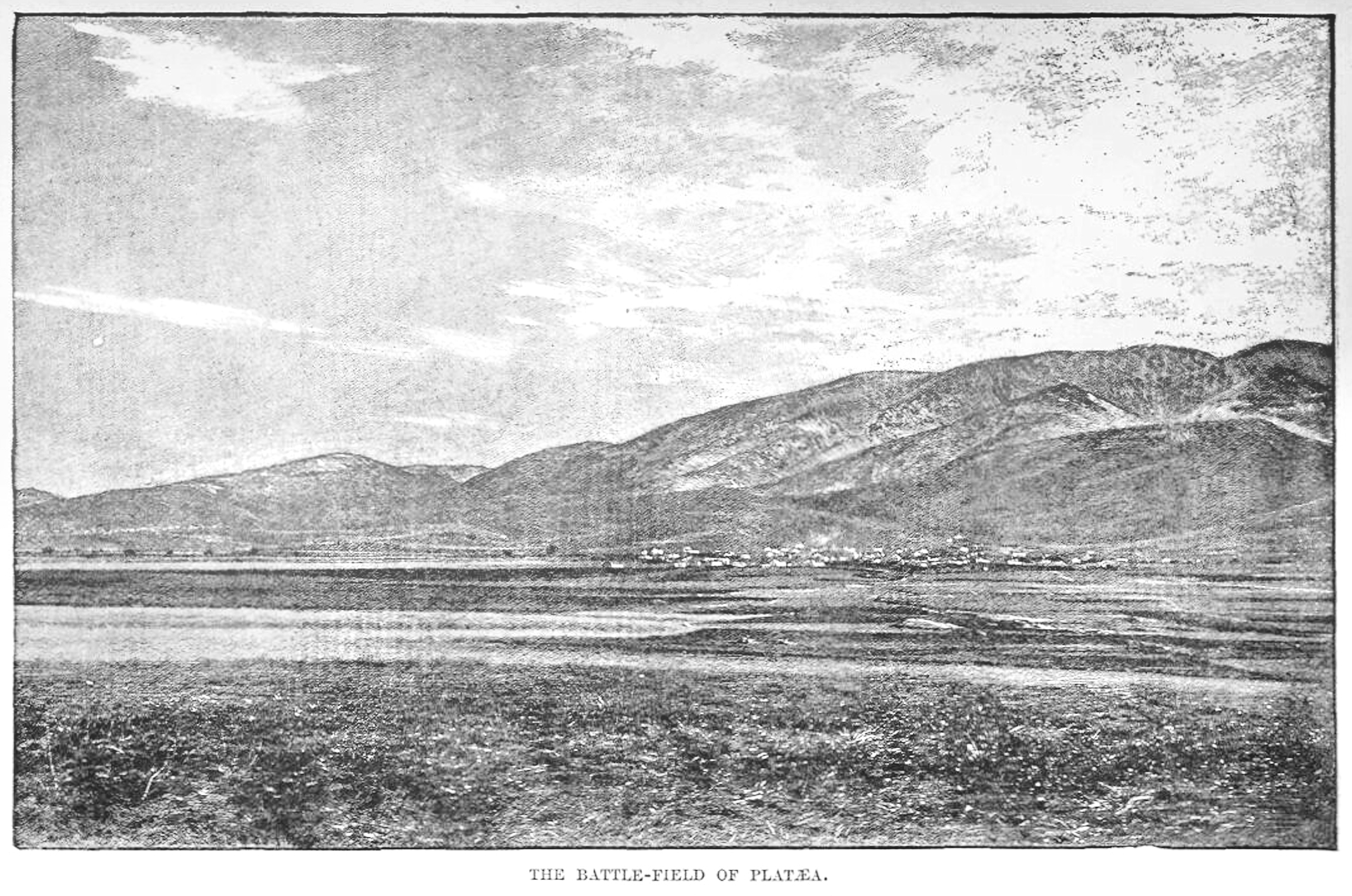
The battlefield of Plataea from the Achaemenid (northern) side.

Konecny argues that the Spartans had thus mobilized almost all of their fighting age helots to assist on the logistical problems posed by such a large Greek army. He argues that only 10,000 helots were deployed for combat, while the remaining 25,000 helots worked the supply lines. He further claims that if all the 35,000 helots had been on the battlefield, the Greeks couldn't have formed their phalanxes before the first Persian charge. Konecny estimates that during Mardonius' march to Skolos he had traveled around 70 kilometres (43 mi) from Athens in two days, while most of his army would have taken around a week.

Konecny estimates that the allied Greek army required 300,000 liters (79,000 U.S. gal) of water daily. The mountain slopes they had deployed on did not have access to freshwater, and carrying such quantities daily was logistically difficult and made them highly vulnerable to attacks by Persian cavalry. Sekunda estimates the daily water requirement at 250,000 liters (66,000 U.S. gal) for the 110,000 people in the Greek camp based on a daily requirement of 2.27 liters (0.60 U.S. gal) per person. However, these figures do not account for the water requirements of the animals in the Greek camp.

The historian Paul A. Rahe argues that the Persian supply lines might have extended 100 miles (160 km) or more. He argues that the Persians were probably being supplied from Macedonia by land, and from the Hellespont by sea. He notes that the Phocians had not joined the Persian camp, but instead had chosen to stay on Mount Parnassus, where they raided and pillaged the Persian supply columns.

The historian Theodore Cuyler Young Jr. estimates the daily water requirements for the Persians at 115,000 imperial gallons. Young Jr. posits that the Persians needed 210,000 pounds (95,000 kg) of grain daily if they had 70,000 soldiers. He also estimates that they would have needed 100,000 pounds (45,000 kg) each of grain and fodder daily if they had 10,000 horses. The Persians would therefore have required 410,000 pounds (190,000 kg) of food supplies daily. Young Jr. posits that the Persians would then require 1,709 horses to deliver their supplies each day, assuming each horse could carry 240 pounds (110 kg) and took one day to gather supplies and reach the Persian camp. He argues that a total of 22,217 horses would be required to deliver supplies over the entire 13 days the Persians were encamped at Plataea.

Young Jr., however, argues that the Persians were bringing in supplies from Lamia in southern Thessaly, which took seven days each way. He thus claims that the Persians would need 35,000 horses for all their supply columns, a number they could not have put together. Young Jr. argues that the Persians at Plataea thus did not total 70,000 infantry and 10,000 cavalry. He argues that the Persians wouldn't have issues with supplies if there were large stores at Thebes, which he estimates was 3 miles (4.8 km) from the Persian camp. He argues that the Greeks at Plataea were being resupplied from the Peloponnese, since farming could not be done in both Attica and Boeotia due to the threat posed by the Persians.

== Prelude ==
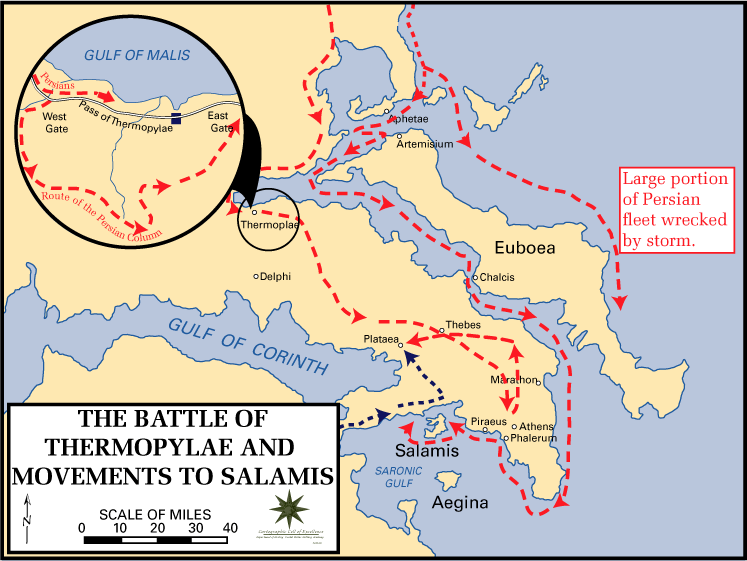
Movements of the Persian and Greek armies in 480–479 BC.

When Mardonius learned of the Spartan force marching to join the allied Greek army, he completed the destruction of Athens, tearing down whatever was left standing. He then retreated towards Boeotia, hoping to lure the Greek army into territory which was advantageous for the Persian cavalry. Mardonius withdrew from Attica through the Decelea defile, passed by Sphendale, crossed the Parnes range, encamped for a night at Tanagra and then marched to Skolos. Mardonius built a fortified encampment around 1.9 square kilometres (0.73 sq mi) in area on the north bank of the Asopos river in Boeotia, thus covering the ground from Erythres past Hysiae and up to the lands of Plataea.

The Athenians under the command of Aristides joined the Allied army at Eleusis in Attica. The army traveled on the Oenoe road via Panactum, the plains of Skourta and the eastern Pastra mountain, across the passes of Mount Cithaeron and arrived near Plataea. (Note: According to Plutarch, when the Greeks were preparing for the battle at Plataea, Aristides was told by the Oracle of Delphi to face off against the Persians on Athenian lands, on the plains of Eleusinian Demeter and Kore (Persephone). The Athenians thought this referred to Eleusis in Attica and were planning to returning there. However, the Plataean commander Arimnestos was ordered by Zeus Soter in a dream to search for the plain near Plataea. The Greeks found such a plain and decided to stay in Plataea. The region was endowed to Athens as per the prophecy of the oracle.) The archaeologist Andreas Konecny estimates that the crossing of Cithaeron took place sometime between late July and mid August. Under the guidance of their commanding general, Pausanias, the Greeks took up positions opposite the Persian lines but remained on high ground. They deployed their lines from Erythrai to Hysiai, and from their positions on the Cithaeron could observe the Persian lines 4 kilometres (2.5 mi) across the Asopos river. The Greek units were camped in order of their positions in the phalanx, so that the formation could be set up easily at the start of battle.

Mardonius initiated hit-and-run cavalry attacks against the Greek lines. During what may have been a reconnaissance patrol, the Persians had noticed a gap in the Greek lines on the western flank. At the foot of a cliff, the Megarians were deployed in terrain accessible to the Persian cavalry, about 1 kilometre (0.62 mi) from the westernmost point of the line. The Megarian line was about 400 metres (1,300 ft) wide at the front, of this frontage, about 250 metres (820 ft) was exposed. The Persian cavalry under the command of Masistius began attacking in continuous waves. Konecny estimates that hundreds of cavaliers were required to attack in each wave. The Megarians requested reinforcements and said they would retreat if these were not sent.

300 Athenians, hoplites or infantry, and their archers replaced the Megarians at the spot where the Persian cavalry was attacking. These Athenians were commanded by Olympiodoros. The Athenians formed a single or double line formation, and from their rear their archers fired their volleys. An Athenian archer managed to hit Masistius' horse when the latter was on the frontline opposite the Athenians. Masistius was flung off his horse and landed near the Athenian line, where the soldiers started stabbing him but were unable to kill him as he was wearing scale corslet armor underneath his clothes. Masistius was finally killed when an Athenian soldier stabbed him in the eye. The Persians tried to recover his body but were pushed back by the Greek infantry, which had just arrived to reinforce the Athenians. The Persian cavalry retreated soon after. The Persians mourned the death of Masistius by shaving their hair and chopping off the manes of their animals.

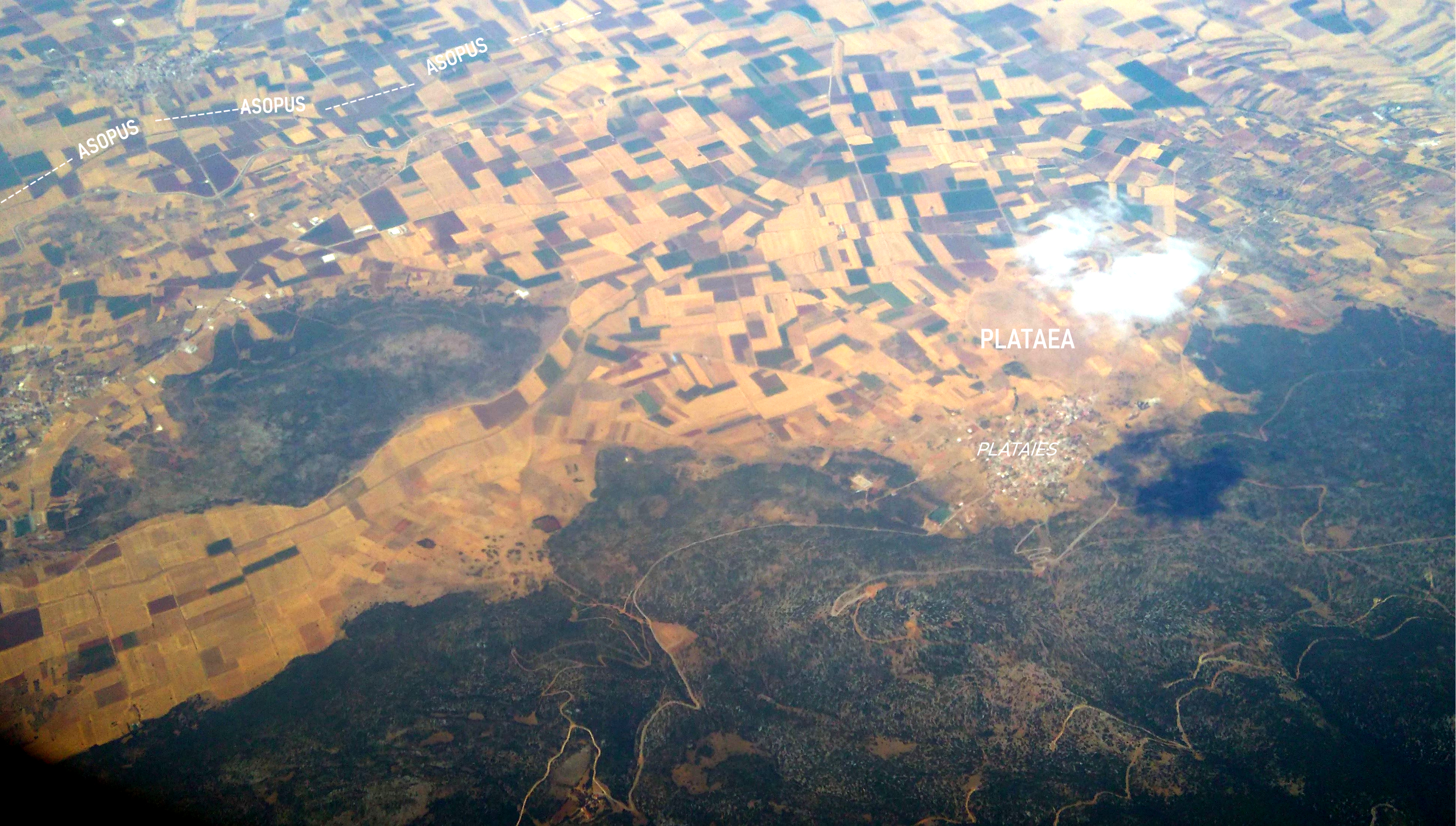
View of the battlefield from above. The battle took place on the hilly plain between the Asopos river (top) and Plataea (center right).

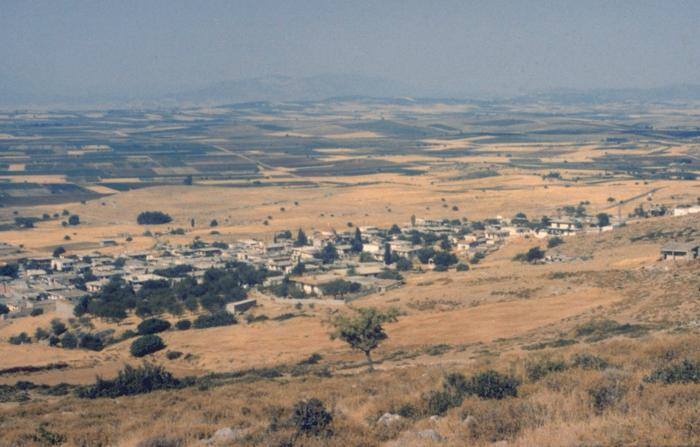
The battlefield of Plataea seen from the south, i.e. from the hills of the Cithaeron Range. Modern city of Plataies, near the ruins of old Plataea slightly beyond.

Masistius' body was paraded on a cart in front of the Greek lines. Their morale boosted by this small victory, the Greeks moved forward, still remaining on higher ground, to a new position near the Asopos river which was more defensible and better watered. (Note: The historian Andreas Konecny argues that Pausanias and the other strategoi had gathered the resolve to move closer to the Asopos river only because they had managed to repulse the attack by Masistius and his cavalry.) The historian Andrew Robert Burn estimates that this position was 3 miles (4.8 km) to the left of their initial position, and about 1 to 2 miles (1.6 to 3.2 km) from the foothills of Mount Cithaeron. In response to the Greek movement, Mardonius brought his men westward up to the Asopos and arrayed them for battle in a line 5 kilometres (3.1 mi) long. However, neither the Persians nor the Greeks chose to attack; Herodotus claims this is because both sides had received bad omens from their seers. (Note: The seer for the Persians was Hegesistratus of Elis. The seer for the Greeks was Tisamenus of the Iamidai clan.) Konecny argues that this is because both of them were waiting for their opponent to attack first. The armies thus stayed camped in their locations for eight days.

The historian William Shepherd posits that Mardonius did not attack because he wanted to let the Greeks move to open ground, and because he wanted them to let their supply lines become extended and vulnerable. Shepherd also notes that the seers on both sides had predicted victory in a defensive battle, but defeat for the side which crossed the Asopos river. He argues that, at this point, neither Pausanias nor Mardonius might have thought they had enough numbers to attack and win.

On the eighth day after the arrival of the Persian and Greek armies at Plataea, heeding the advice of a Theban named Timagenes, Mardonius set up a lookout on the passes of Mount Cithaeron. At night on the same day, Mardonius dispatched his cavalry to attack a Greek supply convoy, which resulted in the Greek supply lines being halted. The Greeks were attacked by the Persian cavalry for the next two days. He launched another cavalry raid on the Greek lines, which succeeded in blocking the Gargaphian spring, which had been the only source of water for the Greek army, as they could not draw from the Asopos due to the threat posed by Persian archers. The Gargaphian spring was probably to the rear of the Greek position, and the Persian cavalry might have been behind the Greek lines when it blocked the spring.

The initial movements at the Battle of Plataea. The Greek line moves forward to the Asopos ridge.

The Greeks had now been encamped at their second position for 12 days. The lack of food and the destruction of their water supply made the Greek position untenable, so they decided to retreat to a position in front of Plataea, where they could guard the passes and have access to fresh water. To prevent the Persian cavalry from attacking during the retreat, it was to be performed that night. The position the Greeks chose for their retreat was named the "island", at a distance of about 1.8 kilometres (1.1 mi) from both the Asopos river and the Gargaphian spring. The "island" was around 600 metres (2,000 ft) wide according to Lazenby; and 2,000 yards (6,000 ft; 1,800 m) wide according to Rahe. The banks of the "island" protected against cavalry attacks, and to the south of the "island" were the passes where the Greek supply columns were stuck. During the day chosen for the retreat, the Greeks underwent constant attacks by the Persian cavalry.

Meanwhile, the Persians were considering a retreat to Thebes where they had stored much food, as well as fodder for their pack animals. This withdrawal was proposed by Artabazos, who also advised bribing the commanders of the Greek states while defending their new position. Artabazos probably wanted to make the Greeks cross the Asopos river while chasing his army and make them fight on the northern bank of the Asopos. Mardonius rejected this proposal because he believed his army was superior to the Greeks and because he wanted to fight the Greeks before they received more reinforcements.

However, the retreat went awry. The Allied contingents in the centre began their movement late at night, and perhaps because they were not aware of the new terrain, ended up advancing 1.8 kilometres (1.1 mi) past the island to arrive at the Temple of Hera. The Tegeans and Spartans on the right wing were chosen to advance to the Cithaeron passes and accompany the stuck supply convoys to the new Greek position. However, these units had not even begun to retreat by daybreak. This was because a Spartan commander, Amompharetus, refused to retreat because he thought it was cowardly. While the rest of the Spartans retreated, his lochos was left behind.

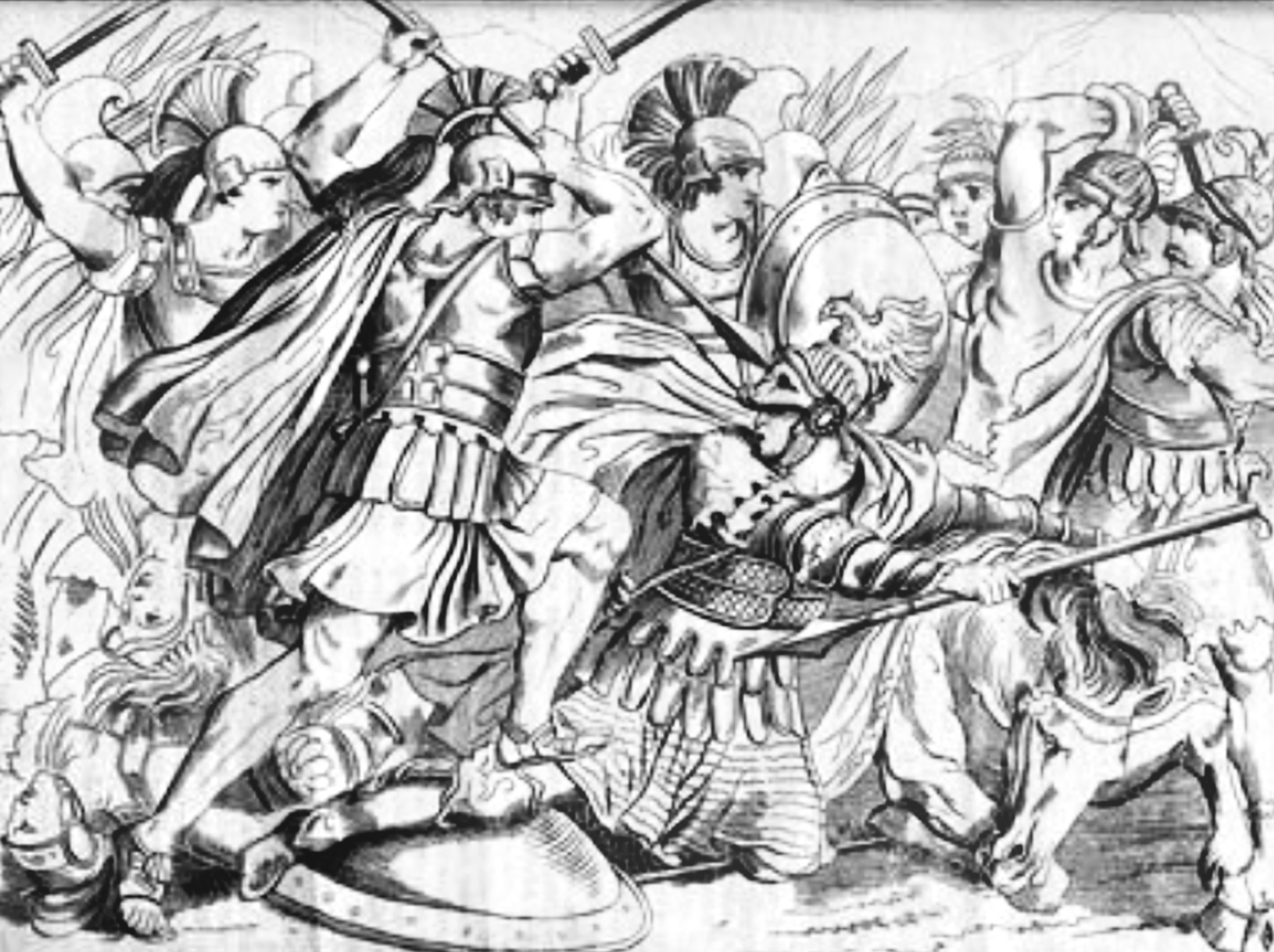
The death of Masistius during the early skirmishes.

Meanwhile the Athenians and Plataeans had also been unable to retreat, because their path had been blocked by the scattered centre. The Athenians sent a messenger to Pausanias asking for his new directive. Pausanias asked the Athenians to retreat to the Cithaeron passes and not to the "island", and join the Spartans if possible. This message was received before daybreak but the Athenians began moving only after dawn. Konecny posits that Aristides may have wanted to avoid the chaos of nighttime movements. Pausanias then marched 3 kilometres (1.9 mi) to the north of modern Erythres, and the Greeks of the scattered center started to converge on his position, though the latter probably took longer to get into formation. Pausanias' two units, however, were the first ones ready for contact when the Persian cavalry arrived.

The Persian cavalry had begun to mobilize for attacking by this time. However, because Amompharetus and his unit were still in their line of sight, they did not rush, perhaps thinking that all of their opponent's army was just ahead of Amompharetus' unit. This might have allowed Pausanias to execute his retreat safely, and given Amompharetus enough time to withdraw. When the Persian cavalry arrived at the Greek position, they found it decamped and conveyed this information to Mardonius through a messenger. Rahe estimates that the date for this final battle was the 27th or 28th of August. The historian Theodore Cuyler Young Jr. also estimates the date of the battle to be the 27th of August.

== Battle ==
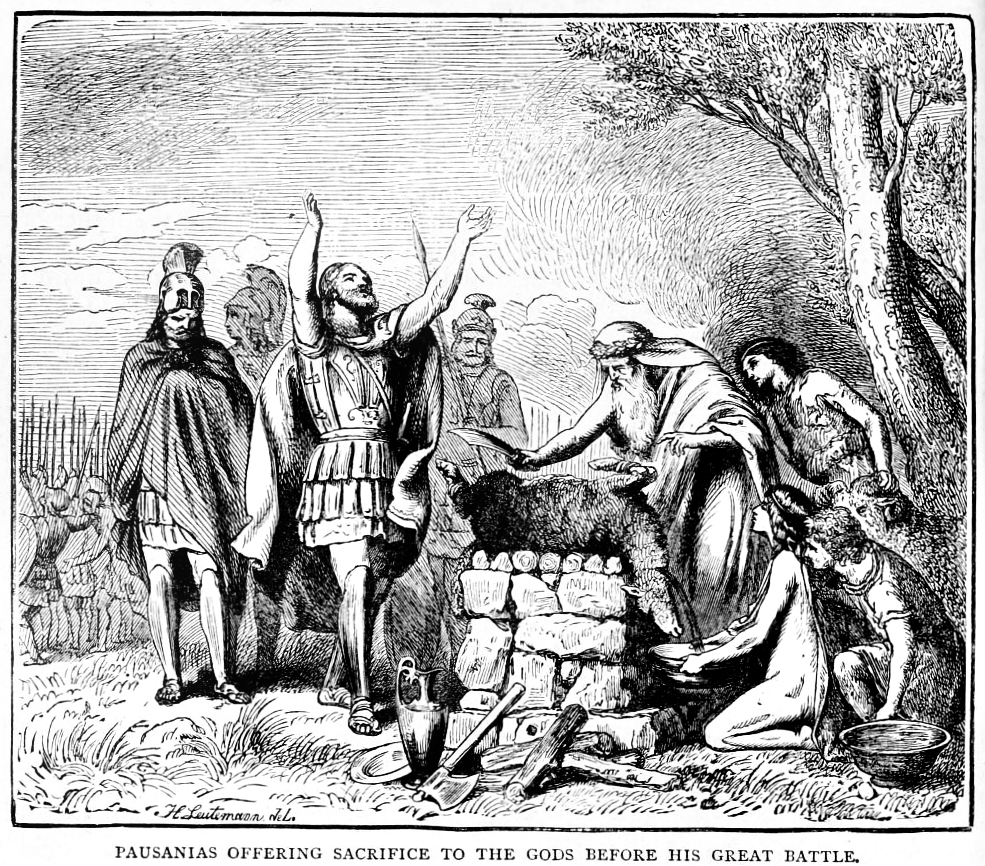
Pausanias offering sacrifices to the gods before the battle.

During the retreat of the Greeks on the 13th day after their arrival, all of their center wing left the field while their right wing initially did not budge. The Spartans and Tegeans had by now reached the Temple of Demeter. The rearguard under Amompharetus began to withdraw from the ridge to join them. Konecny argues that the Spartans already had Amompharetus' lochos in their formation when the first units of the Persian cavalry started attacking. The historian Andrew Robert Burn argues that the Persian wings by now were converging on the Greek position. He argues that if the Spartans and Athenians had merged, they could have attacked a Persian flank.

Konecny estimates that Pausanias' line, which had 11,500 soldiers, was 1.3 to 1.45 kilometres (0.81 to 0.90 mi) long, assuming it was eight ranks deep and each soldier took up 0.8 to 1 metre (2.6 to 3.3 ft) of space. (Note: Konecny considers the possibility that Pausanias' line could have been longer if it was fewer ranks deep, similar to how the Athenians had deployed their lines at the Battle of Marathon.) Pausanias asked the Athenians to reinforce his troops, but the latter had been engaged by the phalanx of the Thebans and Mardonius' Greeks, and were unable to assist Pausanias. Konijnendijk argues that the Spartans' flank had been attacked by the Persians, and notes that Pausanias had asked the Athenians to deploy their archers, who were tactically needed against the Persian archers and missileers, if they could not deploy all of their army.

Meanwhile, Mardonius had learned of the Greek retreat and rushed to Pausanias' position with the Persian left wing he was personally commanding. They had marched around 5 kilometres (3.1 mi) from their camp behind the Asopos river to the Argiopios. The Greeks had put up their shields at their front line and were fighting the Persian cavalry. The Persians were not advancing in a formation but managed to form their lines opposite the Greek phalanx. Konecny argues that the distance between both fronts might have been 50 to 70 metres (160 to 230 ft). Another estimate for the distance between the Greek and Persian lines is 100 to 150 metres (330 to 490 ft). When the Persian infantry arrived, the Persian cavalry temporarily withdrew to rest their mounts and refill their arsenal. By now, the Persians had formed their shield wall and their archers continued to fire while covered behind it. The Persian Immortal lines were probably ten files deep, where sparabara were on the front wearing scaled iron corslets, armed with spears, bows and shields. The nine soldiers to the rear were armed with bows and spears, or axes.

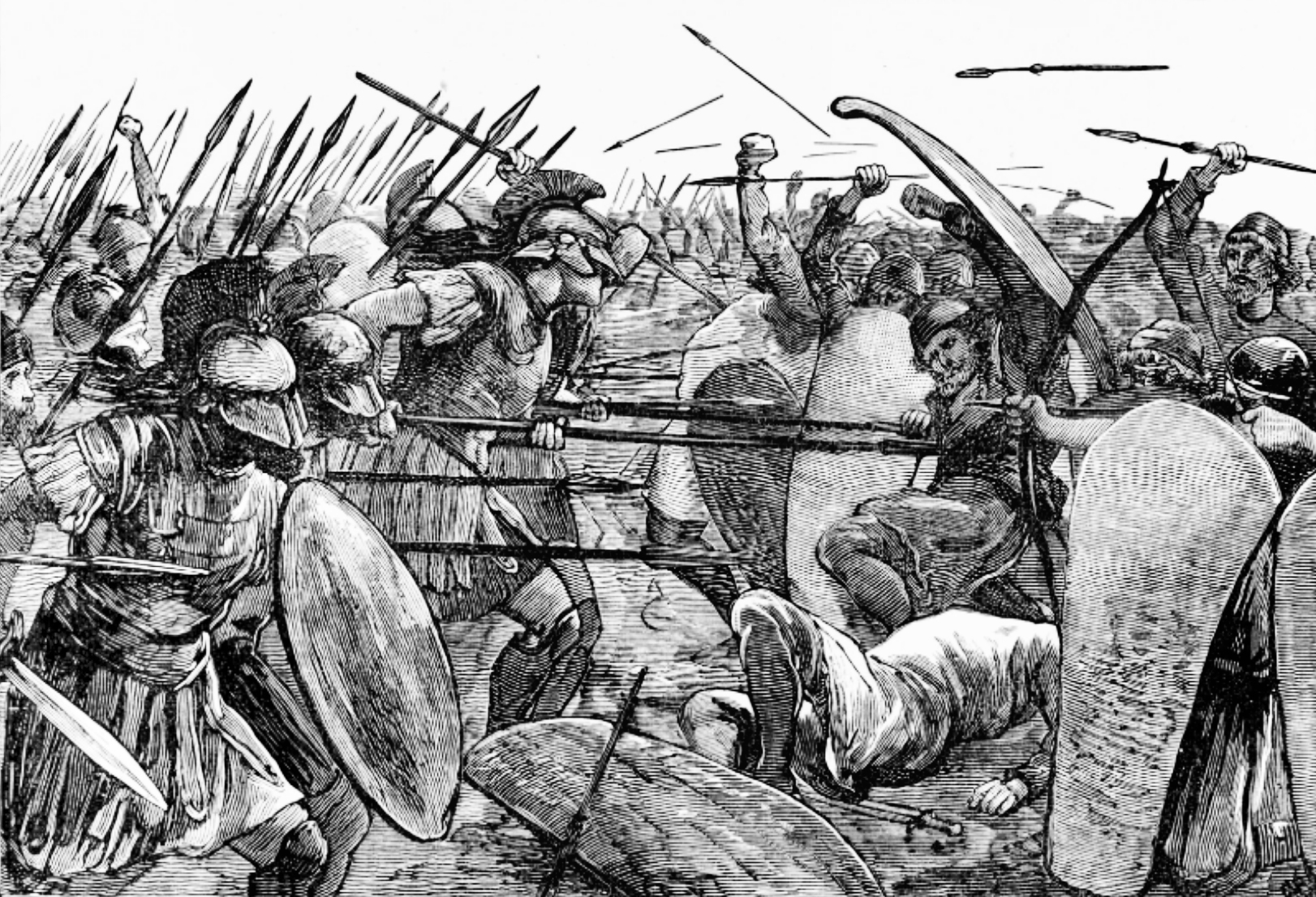
Scene of the Battle of Plataea. 19th century illustration.

According to Herodotus, Pausanias refused to advance because he was waiting for good omens. At this point, as Greek soldiers began to fall under the barrage of arrows, the Tegeans started to run at the Persian lines. Pausanias finally received favorable omens and ordered the Spartans to also charge the Persian lines. Konecny argues that the Persian arrow volleys were dispiriting for the Greeks, since their arrows might have managed to hit undefended gaps and body parts.

The Spartans and Tegeans had started to push into the Persian lines. The Greeks started thrusting their spears at the Persian shield wall, and some of them tried to break the Persians' shields. The Persians put aside their bows and tried to break the Greeks' spears by grabbing hold of them, but failed. At this point, the hoplites might have closed the distances between each other and huddled together tightly. They started pushing against the Persians, who were risking asphyxiation because they were not accustomed to such fighting. The Persians may have stepped back a little and sent small groups to attack portions of the Greek line, in order to drive them away from the contingent that was pushing forward.

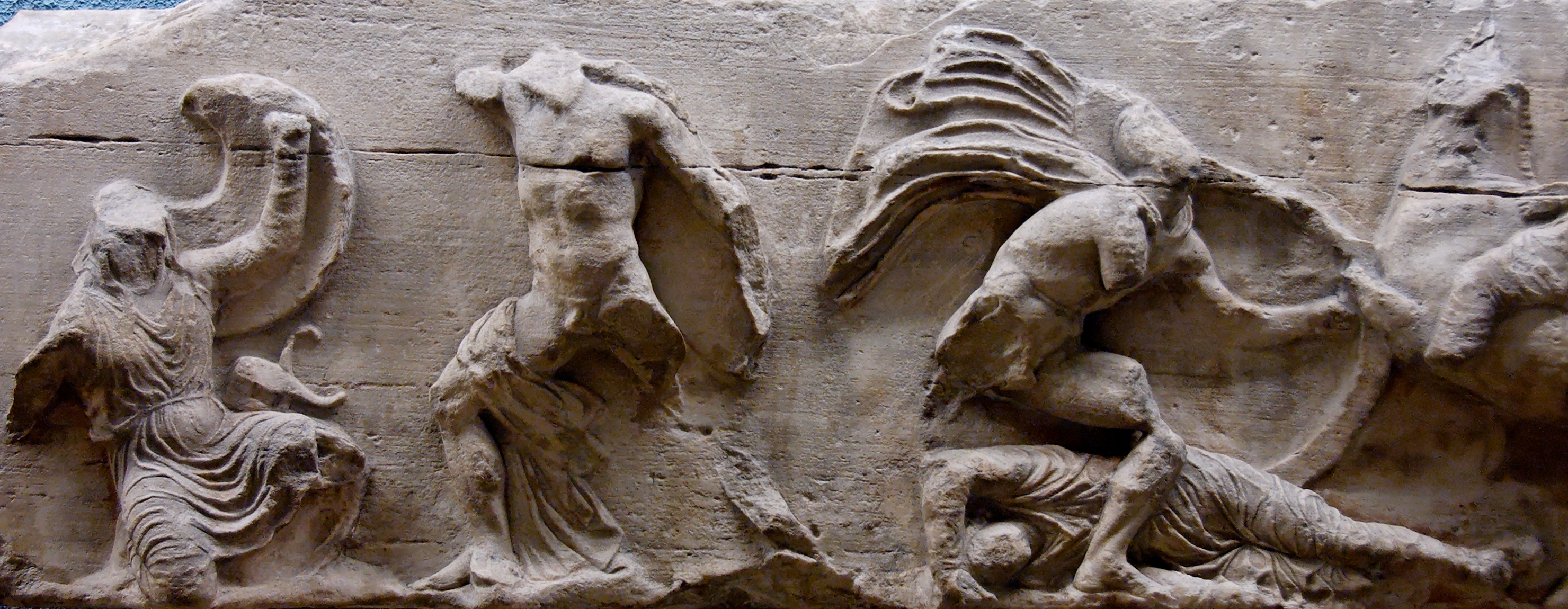
Scene of the Battle of Plataea on the south frieze of the Temple of Athena Nike, Athens. The scene on the right may show the fight over the body of Masistius. British Museum, London.

Konijnendijk argues that the Greeks formed an open phalanx and not a closed one. He argues that the Spartans then formed a defensive line, thus pulling the Persians in towards them. He argues that the continuing use of ballistic weapons and small clashes along the lines reduced numbers on both sides, however, the Greeks did not break ranks and retreat. Meanwhile, the Spartans had outnumbered the Persians guarding Mardonius. Konijnendijk argues that these Persians inflicted many casualties on the Spartans till Aeimnestus, a soldier, hurled a stone at Mardonius and killed him. Artabazos did not agree with Mardonius about attacking the Greeks. He had arranged the 40,000 soldiers under his command in a tight formation and advanced slowly. As the rout commenced, he led these men away from the battlefield to Phocis, avoiding their camp and escaping eventually to the Hellespont.

Mardonius' death hit the morale of his guards, and once they broke their lines and retreated, the rest of the Persian army did so too. However, the Athenians still had to fight the Thebans who were pitted up against them. Eventually, the Thebans retreated. Meanwhile, the Persian cavalry did not let the Greeks pursue and outflank the rest of the retreating Persian army. Konijnendijk argues that it is puzzling that these cavaliers did not participate in the fight fully at this point, and notes that perhaps they were following standard Persian cavalry tactics.

The main phase of the battle at Plataea. The Greek retreat becomes disorganised, and the Persians cross the Asopus to attack.

The historian Robert Gaebel argues that the Persian cavalry who had covered the retreat of the Persian army were actually Boiotian cavalry, particularly the Theban cavalry led by Asopodoros, the son of Timandros. Gaebel observes that Herodotus had written about these cavalry units attacking the Greek center and inflicting 600 casualties on them, while the Thebans had suffered 300 casualties during this attack. Gaebel estimates that the Greek center (Note: The Greek center was composed of soldiers from Corinth, Megaria and Phleiasia. However, the Corinthians had not advanced across the open plains and had stayed on the foothills of Mount Cithaeron.) had 3,500 to 4,000 soldiers, while the Theban cavalry had a maximum of 1,000 soldiers.

Gaebel argues that the Thebans had managed to inflict disproportionate casualties on the Greek center because the latter had not formed their phalanx and were running astray. Gaebel notes that the Megarians had already been attacked successfully by Persian cavalry previously, and should not have risked advancing in open plains where the opponent's cavalry was also present. The Theban cavalry probably attacked the rushing Greek center before Pausanias had won against Mardonius, and later these cavalry forces protected those retreating to Thebes.

The Greeks chased the Persians to their camp after the latter's defeat. The Spartans arrived first and waited for the Athenians, who knew how to scale the walls. The Tegeans were the first ones to breach the walls. The Persians could not get into formation and took heavy losses; Herodotus estimates that only 3,000 Persians survived the fighting at the camp. Konecny argues that 3,000 actually might have been the number of prisoners taken by the Greeks, while the other Persians in the camp fled, whose numbers Herodotus might not have discovered.

== Accounts of individuals ==
Herodotus recounts several anecdotes about the conduct of specific Spartans during the battle.

- Amompharetus: The leader of a battalion (lochos) of Spartans (specifically Pitanates), he refused to undertake the night-time retreat towards Plataea before the battle, because he thought it was cowardly. At dawn, the rest of the Spartan army finally began to retreat, leaving Amompharetus' division behind. Amompharetus eventually led his men to join the retreating Spartans. Spartan tradition remembers Amompharetus as winning great renown at Plataea, and it has thus been suggested that Amompharetus, far from being insubordinate, had instead volunteered to guard the rear.
- Aristodemus: The lone Spartan survivor of the Battle of Thermopylae, Aristodemus was branded a coward. Anxious to redeem his name, he charged the Persian lines by himself, but was killed. Although the Spartans agreed that he had redeemed himself, they awarded him no special honour, because he had failed to fight in the disciplined manner expected of a Spartan.
- Callicrates: Considered the "most beautiful man in the whole Greek camp", Callicrates was eager to distinguish himself that day as a warrior, but was deprived of the chance by an arrow that pierced him while he was sitting behind his shield.

== Aftermath ==
According to Herodotus, the Battle of Mycale occurred on the same day as Plataea. After the twin victories of Plataea and Mycale, the second Persian invasion of Greece was over. Moreover, the threat of future invasions was abated; although the Greeks remained worried that Xerxes would attempt an invasion again, over time it became apparent that the Persian desire to conquer Greece was much diminished. The Spartan hoplites who died were buried in two different graves, while the helots were buried in a third one. Those buried at the first grave were either priests (irees) or "young men in their twenties" (irenes). In the first grave were buried Poseidonius, Philokyon, Amompharetus and Callicrates. The Spartans present at the battle had declared Poseidonius the most valiant among them. Sophanes of Athens was also said to have fought valorously. According to Herodotus, there were four other tombs built by the allied Greeks: one each for the Athenians and Tegeans, and two for the Megarians and Phleiasians. Fallen soldiers from other Greek states were probably buried in a common grave. Herodotus had also remarked that the tombs built by these other Greek states were vacant. Sacrifices were offered at these tombs in Plataea annually.

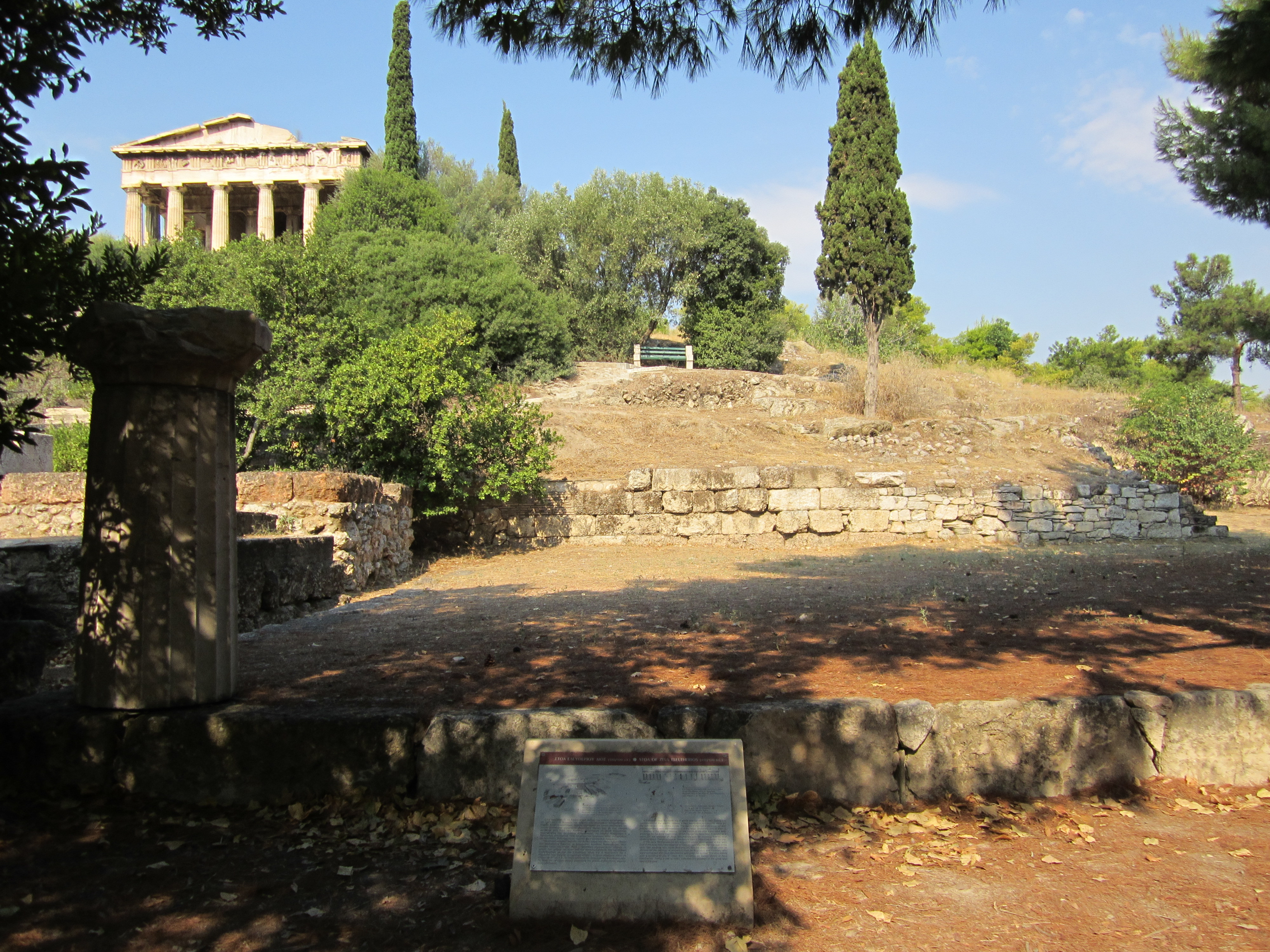
The Stoa of Zeus, built by the Athenians after the battle at Plataea.

After the battle, Pausanias did not permit the desecration of Mardonius' corpse as revenge for the mutilation of Leonidas' body, a proposal put forth by Lampon of Aegina. Pausanias had also freed a Coan woman, who had been captured and put into concubinage in the Persian camp. According to Thucydides, after the battle, Pausanias had offered at "the agora (public square) of Plataea a sacrifice to Zeus Eleutherios". A marble altar was constructed for the deity and sacrifices continued to be offered to him in Plataea. The goddess Homonoia (Concord) was also added to the altar. The Athenians also built the Stoa of Zeus in their city's agora to honor Zeus Eleutherios, who had helped them in their victory against the Persians at Plataea. The Stoa was used to store the shields of the Athenians who had fallen at Plataea.

The allied Greek army rested for ten days, then proceeded to besiege Thebes and rebuke those among the city's politicians who had advocated for the Persian cause. Attaginus, the foremost medizing politician, escaped; his sons were pardoned by Pausanias. However, all the other remaining medisers were executed without being tried, because it was believed they were going to evade punishment through bribery. The Spartans did not send any troops for the allied effort after the battle; the historian Marcello Lupi contends that the Spartans did so because they did not have any naval experience, because they believed their soldiers could have been corrupted by the Persians, and because they wanted to solidify their dominance in the Peloponnese. The allied forces were commanded by the Athenians for the remainder of the war.

The Mantineans and Eleans were delayed in their arrival at Plataea. After the battle, both states exiled those among their leaders who were responsible for the delay. Hegesistratus, an Elean, was working for Mardonius at Plataea, but was later captured in Zacynthus and executed. The city of Caryae, according to Vitruvius, had medized during the Persian invasion. After the battle of Plataea, the city was captured by the allied Greeks, the city's men were executed and the women were enslaved.

The remnants of the Persian army, under the command of Artabazos, tried to retreat to Asia Minor. Travelling through the lands of Thessaly, Macedonia and Thrace by the shortest road, Artabazos eventually made it back to the Hellespont, though losing many soldiers to Thracian attacks, weariness and hunger. After the victory at Mycale, the Allied fleet sailed to the Hellespont to break down the pontoon bridges, but found that this had already been done. The Peloponnesians sailed home, but the Athenians remained to attack the Chersonesos, still held by the Persians. There was a Persian garrison in Sestos, the strongest town in the region, and the Athenians laid siege to them there. After a protracted siege Sestos fell to the Athenians.

In Sestos, the medizing general Artayctes was crucified and his son was stoned to death by Xanthippus, an Athenian general. According to Plutarch, Alexander the Great, during his invasion of Persia, had recognized that the victory at Plataea had paved the way for his conquest. The battle is said to have laid the way for Athenian hegemony in the Aegean, the end of the Achaemenid power and the concurrent conquests of Alexander.

=== Spoils ===
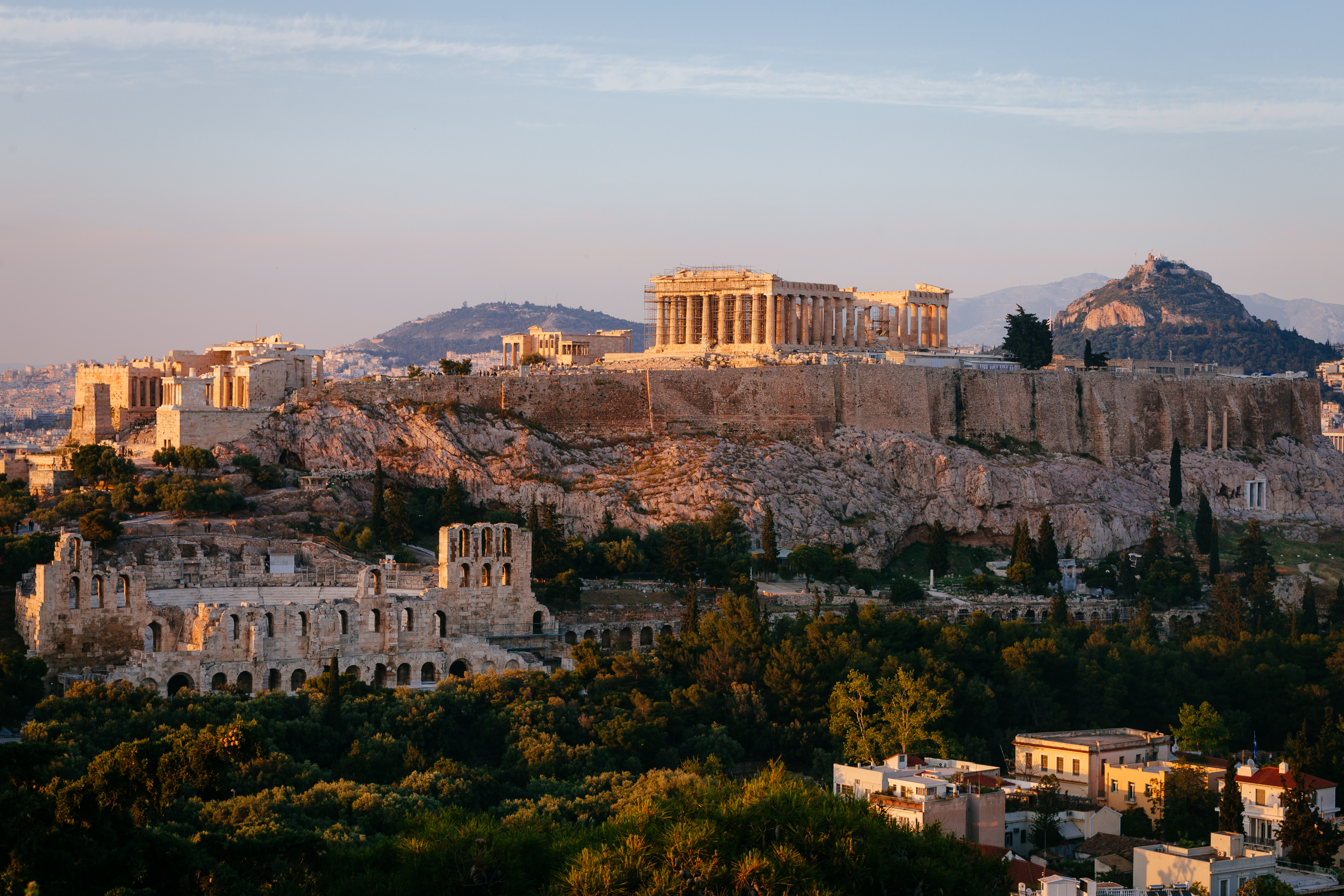
The Acropolis of Athens, where the Athenian share of the Persian spoils may have been stored.

The cuirass armor of Masistius, the Persian cavalry commander, was displayed at the shrine of Athena Polias in the Erechtheion, located in the Acropolis complex in Athens, and was still to be found at the same location in the 2nd century AD. The geographer Pausanias had seen a sword, said to be Mardonius' acinaces, in the Acropolis. Pausanias had also said the tomb of Mardonius was open to the public in his time. The manger of Mardonius' horse, fabricated in bronze and captured by the Tegeans, was gifted to the Temple of Athena Alea in Tegea. The loot pillaged from the Persians was sold to fund the construction of multiple buildings, like the Athenian Treasury at Delphi. It is possible that originals, misattributions or replicas of the Persian spoils from Plataea were stored at the Acropolis complex, particularly in the Parthenon.

The historian Irene de Jong argues that the spoils of the Persian wars were instrumental in advancing the Athenian assimilation of Persian culture. She argues that Pausanias had sent the helots, and not the Greek regulars, to collect the loot either because he wanted it to be distributed fairly, or because he wanted most of it for himself. However, the helots did steal some of the loot while collecting the luxury articles and the armor and gear of the fallen Persian soldiers. She argues that the loot was a windfall, composed of riches which were greater than what the Greeks were accustomed to. The loot included tents, couches, vessels, cauldrons, weapons and armor; all of these were fashioned in either gold, silver or bronze. Three artifacts, made of gold and bronze and created from the Persian spoils, were offered to the gods. A tripod was dedicated to Apollo at Delphi, and one statue each to Zeus at Olympia and to Poseidon at the Isthmus of Corinth.

de Jong notes that the Greek soldiers had divided between themselves the "women, horses, talents, camels and yoke animals" captured from the Persian camp. She also notes that the Plataeans later come about treasure chests in the area. She notes that Herodotus was surprised when the colorful Persian garments, which he was very interested in, were not taken by the Greeks sent to pick up the loot. She notes how Pausanias had, after the battle, asked the Persian and Spartan cooks to prepare meals for him. Observing the difference between the two, and also the luxurious nature of the Persian furniture and decor in Mardonius' tent, he had asked the other Greek commanders to come over. Pausanias then pointed out these luxuries and told them it was absurd for the Persians, who lived luxurious lifestyles, to invade the Greeks, who lived austerely. She argues that this experience had attracted Pausanias to the luxurious Persian lifestyle and might have led to his medism, especially since he had claimed and received a greater share of the loot at Plataea.

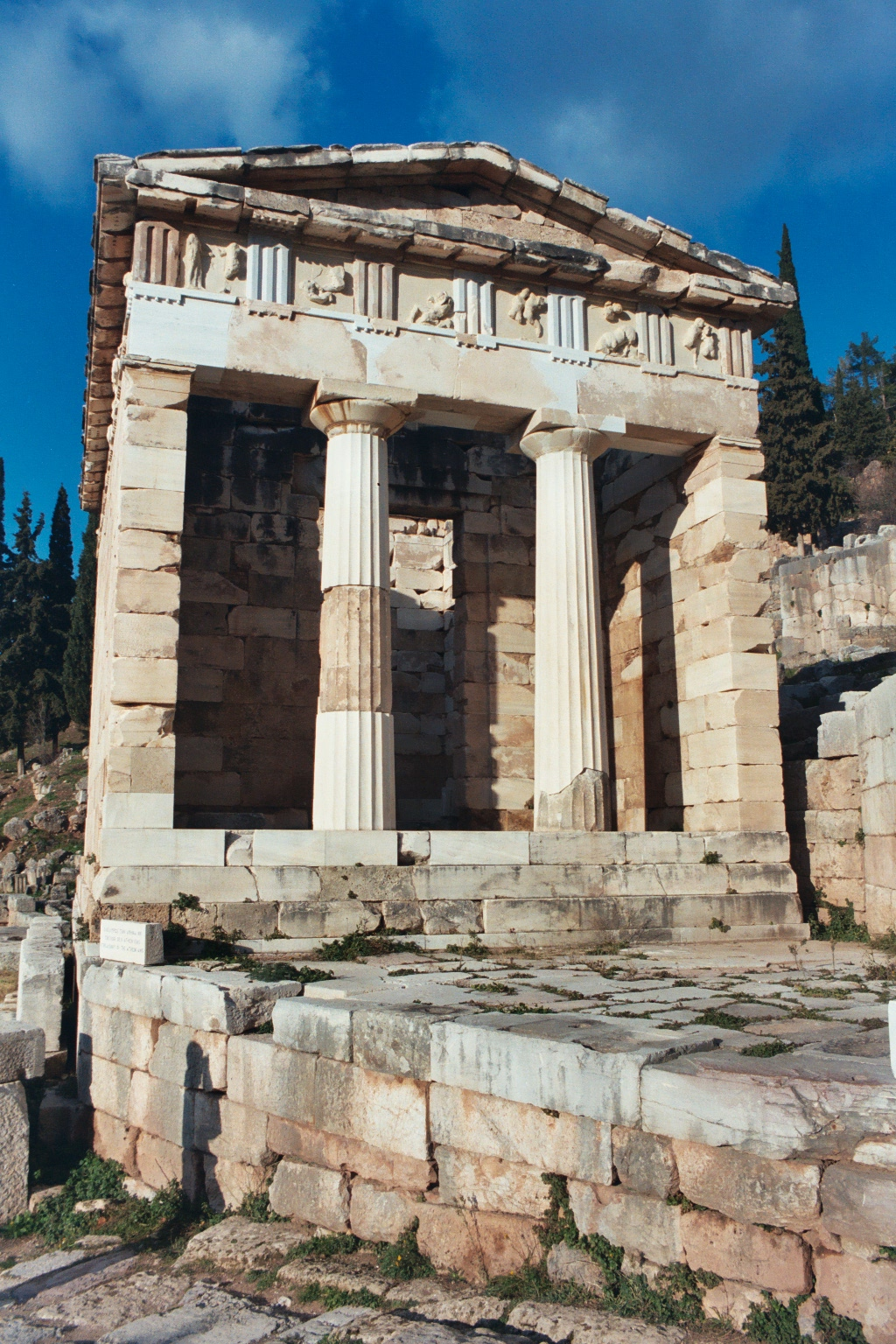
The Athenian Treasury at Delphi. Its construction was partly funded by spoils from the battle.

One-tenth of all the Persian loot was given to Pausanias and not to the state of Sparta. This disproportionate distribution was concerning for the Spartans, especially because Pausanias had not dedicated any of his spoils to the gods' temples. Herodotus had observed that the gains from Spartan victories could have endangered the very fabric of their society. He had also noted the concerns of the homoioi about the loot from the Persian wars. The historian Ellen Millender argues that the desire to acquire spoils and glory led to Spartan leaders initiating multiple endless wars, which destabilized Sparta. According to Herodotus, the helots mistakenly sold the gold items to the Aeginetans at the price of bronze, and the latter acquired their wealth because of this. Millender argues that this anecdote, and Pausanias' insistence on sending the helots to strip the loot from the dead Persians, were instances where Sparta wanted to insult the helots and make them negative examples for its citizens. The historian Ray Nyland argues that this anecdote by Herodotus might be false because Aigina had been a wealthy commercial center in the preceding century; and further argues that this was an instance of Herodotus disparaging the Aeginetans.

The historian Caroline Vout argues that the Greek soldiers and generals were reminded to pay the "gods" their due share, which was one-tenth of the total loot, while the rest was distributed among the allied Greek states. She argues that the focus was on the Persian gold, which was melted down to create, among other items, the Delphic Tripod, which later became the Serpent Column. She argues that the battle of Plataea was an anomaly in the sense of the loot it begot, perhaps because Xerxes' royal tent, which had extensive supplies, was retained for Mardonius' stay and later plundered. She further argues that the victories at Plataea and Mycale heralded the Greek incorporation of Persian culture, and also increased the significance assigned to Persian articles.

== Legacy ==
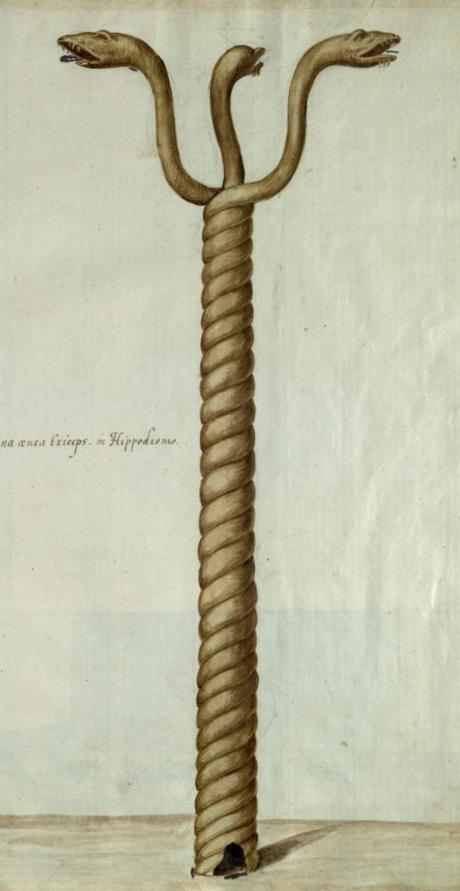
Rendering of the undamaged column.

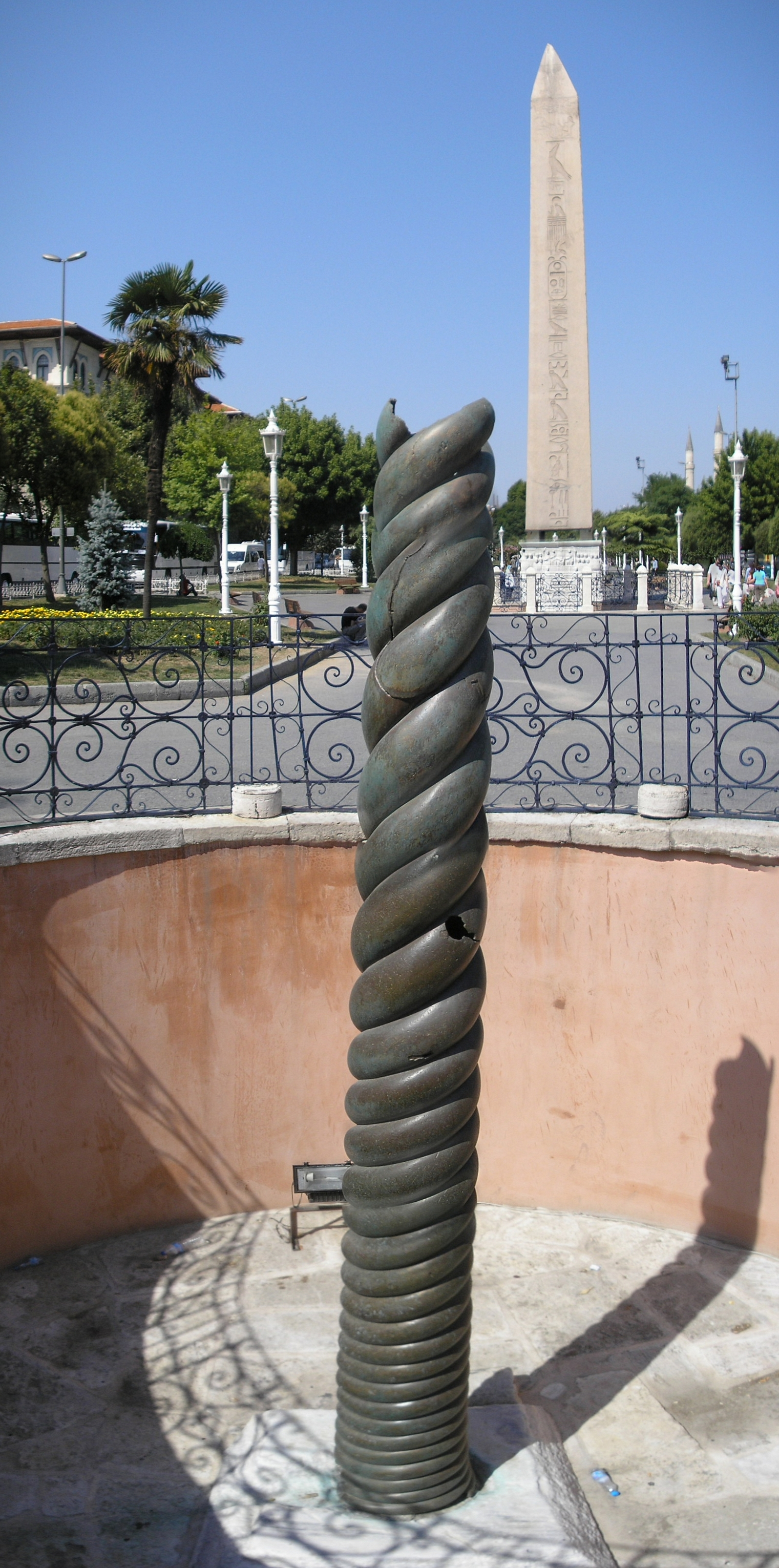
The Serpent Column dedicated by the victorious Greeks, located in Istanbul, formerly Constantinople.

A bronze column in the shape of intertwined snakes, the Serpent Column, was created from melted-down Persian armor, acquired during the plunder of the Persian camp, and was erected at Delphi. It commemorated all the 31 Greek city-states that had participated in the battle, listing them on the "coils" of the column. Most of the column still survives in the Hippodrome of Constantinople in present-day Istanbul, where it was carried by Constantine the Great during the founding of his city on the Greek colony of Byzantium.

The poet Simonides of Ceos was instrumental in commemorating the victory at Plataea. He wrote an encomium and an elegy about the battle. The historian Marcello Lupi contends that these texts were commissioned by the Spartans, possibly by Pausanias, since they glorify both of them. In Spartan propaganda, the victory at Plataea was seen as having avenged the Spartan defeat at Thermopylai. A festival dedicated to Zeus Eleutherios was initiated in order to honor the Greeks who had died during the battle. This festival was the Eleutheria, a race where the competitors ran for 3 kilometres (1.9 mi) while carrying a shield and wearing full body armor.

The historian Christel Müller argues that Plataea became a lieu de mémoire (place of memory) because of the battle. (Note: For more on Plataea as a lieu de mémoire, see Jung 2006.) According to Herodotus, some Greek city-states had built cenotaphs for the people who would come to visit the site in the future. Müller argues they had built these cenotaphs because they were ashamed at not having taken part in the battle. Nyland notes that this was actually Herodotus' view. Lazenby argues that these states indeed had suffered casualties in the battle, but were either unable to recover their soldiers' bodies, or had buried their fallen soldiers in a collective grave; and put up their own cenotaphs later. Aeimnestus, who had killed Mardonius, was commemorated at the temple of Athena Areia in Plataea, established with 80 talents taken from the spoils.

== Historiography ==
Herodotus' account says that the Corinthians did not follow Pausanias' orders and did not participate in the battle. Simonides, however, says they played a major part in the battle. In the History of the Peloponnesian War by Thucydides, the Syracusan commander Hermocrates says Persian errors and lack of supplies were the reason for their defeat; and also says the Persian army was not bigger than the allied Greek army. In another instance in Thucydides' work, the Corinthians also say that the Greeks won due to Persian mistakes. However, Thucydides might be voicing his own thoughts here, conforming to his negative views on the Persian Wars.

Ctesias, a Greek physician at the court of Artaxerxes II, had written an account of the battle, largely drawn from Persian sources. Diodorus Siculus had based his account largely on works by Ephorus. Plutarch cited Idomeneus of Lampsacus and Simonides for his account. Nyland argues that the sources for the contingent of Olympiodoros relieving the Megarians could be the relatives of Lampon of Thurii, the son of Olympiodoros. Nyland further argues that the source for Amompharetus' refusal to retreat is likely to be an Athenian; because Amompharetus is said to have cast his vote using a stone, which was not a Spartan practice but an Athenian one. Nyland also argues that the Greeks Herodotus had consulted for his narrative of Plataea hadn't fought in the battle, while the medizing Greeks and Persians he had consulted were highly likely to have fought. Nyland argues that these medizing Greeks were the primary sources for Herodotus' account of Plataea, and argues that Herodotus did not cite them explicitly because they were not considered reliable due to their medism.

== Analysis ==
=== Strategy and technology ===
The historian Roel Konijnendijk argues that technological advantages, if these existed, were not among the reasons for the Greek victory over the Persians at Plataea. He argues that there were multiple other reasons for the outcome of the battle. He claims that the Persians' iron cuirass armor was of better quality than the Greek bronze cuirass armor. Konijnendijk states that only some soldiers of both armies wore armor, and that their numbers were not greater than 10%. He thus postulates that the Greeks did not have better armor than the Persians. He argues that it was not the Greeks but the Persian soldiers who were "uniformly trained and equipped for close combat". He claims that the Persian shield wall was the Greeks' target during the early clashes, and that the Persian Immortals had kept fighting even after the shield wall broke, but stopped after their commander Mardonius was killed. He also notes that the Spartans were the only experienced and skilled soldiers in the Greek camp, and that all the other Greek soldiers were amateurs.

Konijnendijk notes the dominance of the Persian cavalry over the Greek infantry, and how the former had initiated the battle at Plataea. He argues that these cavaliers could fire arrows and javelins at the Greeks without coming within the range of the latter's spears; and that the Persian infantry inflicted much damage on the Spartans, who did not have long-range weapons to counter and defend themselves. He also observes how the Persians used their archers for area denial by putting the banks of the Asopos river within their arrows' range and thus cutting off the Greeks' source of fresh water. Konijnendijk argues that the Greeks could have lost at Plataea if their army had been all hoplites, and that the light infantry missileers, who were two-thirds of the Greek army, could counter the Persians' long-range weapons more effectively. He argues that these missileers sought cover behind the hoplite shields at Plataea. He argues that Pausanias knew the hoplites were weaker in such a scenario and that archers were needed.

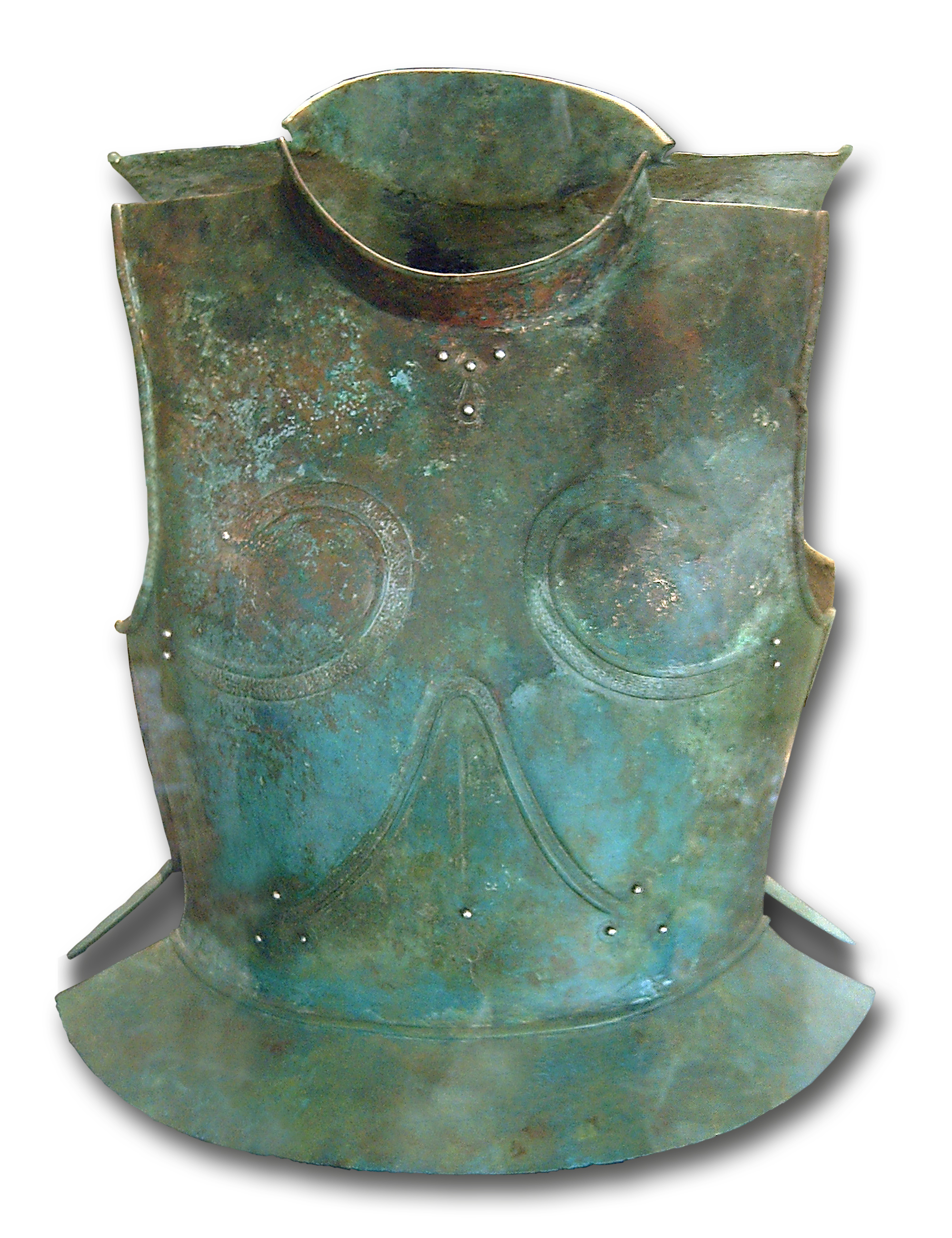
An Ancient Greek bronze cuirass, dated between 620 and 580 BC, probably similar to what the hoplites at Plataea wore. National Archaeological Museum, Madrid.

Konijnendijk notes that the Greeks had sent hoplites and archers for the first few skirmishes, and that the archers had managed to turn these into a pitched battle by injuring the Persian commander's horse. He argues that the Persians had advantages in mobility, range, flexibility and lethality over the Greeks. He argues that the Persians could have outflanked the Greeks easily, but they did not because they actually did not outnumber the Greeks by a lot. He also argues that Mardonius normally would not propose a duel of champions between the Persian Immortals and Greek hoplites because it would reduce his numerical advantage. Konijnendijk argues that Mardonius had proposed the duel because he wanted to reduce the Greeks' numbers, and postulates that the Greeks may have been the ones who outnumbered the Persians, since the latter feared the size of the former's army. Konijendjik argues that the Persian strategy was to pursue a lengthened war and thus force a Greek retreat, since the latter had limited access to supplies and water. He argues that the Greek strategy was to pull the Persians into a pitched battle, because the former were logistically constrained while managing their large army for long; and because they might have believed the terrain was advantageous for them.

Konijnendijk argues that both the Greeks and Persians had depleted their supplies before the final battle. Mardonius may have decided on attacking first because the Greek victory at the Battle of Salamis and the Battle of Mycale threatened his line of communications and routes for retreating. He argues that the Persians lost the battle because they did not deploy their cavalry fully in the final battle, and also because their morale had shattered after Mardonius' death. He further argues that the Greeks did not win because of presumed technological superiority, but because of their consistent refusal to break and their sustained strong morale.

The historian George Cawkwell argues that the Greek inactivity during the first 10 days of the battle did not reflect well on their commander Pausanias. He further argues that all the Greek generals had had no hopes of victory before the final battle commenced. He argues that the Persians' continuous cavalry attacks had been successful, and thus Mardonius' decision to attack and use all of his troops is puzzling. He claims that Mardonius' decision to use all of his cavalry for a charge indicates that the Persians were anyways going to attack the Greeks, even if they had not known the latter were going to retreat or move their camps. Cawkwell argues that the reason for the Persian attack had been a shortage of supplies, since their food stocks were going to run out in a few days, which was also why Artabazos had advocated for retreating to Thebes.

Cawkwell argues that the major lesson of Plataea was the reinforcement of the superiority of the hoplite over Persian light infantry. After the Greco-Persian Wars, the Persian empire started recruiting and relying on Greek mercenaries. Cawkwell observes that, after the battle, the Persians started to deploy their cavalry in front of their infantry, while previously they deployed their cavalry at the center and the flanks of their infantry. Cawkwell further claims that the Persians had developed their Cardaces infantry corps as their counter to Greek infantry. Cawkwell also argues that Greece, which could have been a new Persian satrapy, was lost due to the defeat at Plataea, and not due to the defeat at Salamis.

The archaeologist Andreas Konecny argues that the Greek position near Mount Cithaeron had been very well suited for defence, but they could not have defeated the Persians without fighting a pitched battle. According to Konecny, there were two reasons the Greeks had to fight a pitched battle: because their phalanx armies were not suitable for a war of attrition or maneuver warfare, which the Persian invasion would transform into; and because they did not have the required logistical support. Konecny argues that if the Greeks hadn't fought a pitched battle, the Greek alliance would break apart after entering its third year. Konecny argues that there were large contingents of non-combatants in the Persian camps. He argues that their presence led to the size of Mardonius' army being inflated. Konecny also claims that the Greeks did not have any strategic plans during the retreat, and were instead making tactical movements to avoid being defeated. He further argues that the Greek commanders did not protect their supply lines or routes for retreating.

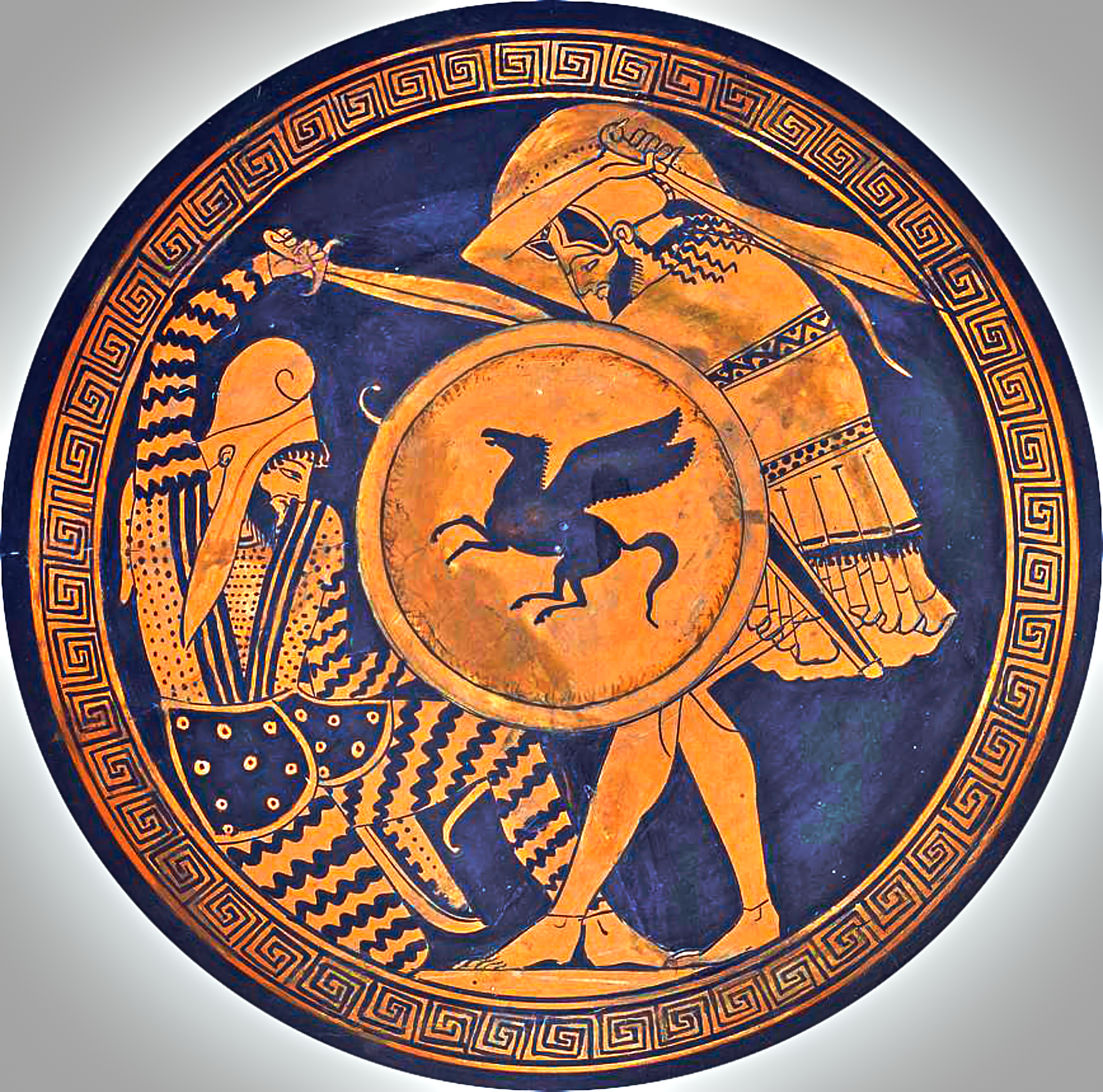
Greek hoplite and Persian warrior depicted fighting on an ancient kylix (cup). Fifth century BC

Konecny argues that after learning of the Greek retreat, Mardonius hurried with the Persian left wing in order to pull ahead of the Greek rear and attack them, because he probably thought that the Greeks had not formed their phalanx yet. Konecny cites Herodotus to observe that these Persians under Mardonius were not in formation, while the Greeks under Pausanias were. Konecny argues that if Mardonius had executed a proper systematic attack or if Artabazos had reinforced him earlier, the Persians might have won, or at least suffered fewer casualties. Konecny further claims that had the Persians not chased the Greeks after their retreat to the "island", the alliance of the latter would eventually break.

The historian John Francis Lazenby observes that the run-up to Plataea had resembled that at the Battle of Marathon in some ways; there was a prolonged stalemate in which neither side risked attacking the other. The reasons for this stalemate were primarily tactical, and similar to the situation at Marathon; the Greek hoplites did not want to risk being outflanked by the Persian cavalry and the lightly armed Persian infantry could not hope to assault well-defended positions. Lazenby argued that Mardonius' actions during the Plataea campaign did not conform to an aggressive policy. He interprets the Persian operations during the prelude not as attempts to force the Allies into battle, but as attempts to force them to retreat. Mardonius may have felt he had little to gain in battle and that he could simply wait for the Greek alliance to fall apart, as it nearly had during the previous winter season. The historian Paul A. Rahe argues that Mardonius lost because he had crossed the Asopos and fielded his infantry on terrain where his cavalry could not fight. Rahe argues that Pausanias' retreat to the foothills was a feigned retreat, designed to lure the Persians into terrain where their cavalry could not operate.

=== Formations ===
Konecny argues that the phalanx formed by all the hoplites was 5 kilometres (3.1 mi) long if it was 8 files deep. He argues that all the Spartan helots were not deployed on the battlefield, because the 35,000 helots in the seven rows to the back plus the 5,000 Spartiates in the front would make the phalanx 9 kilometres (5.6 mi) long. The historian Peter Hunt argues that all the helots were deployed in the Spartan formation. Hunt notes that the Athenian center at Marathon was only a few ranks deep and did not have light infantry in its ranks, and argues that it broke because of this reason. Hunt argues that the Spartans had the helots as light infantry in their formation at Plataea in order to form long lines which could counter the Persians.

Konijnendijk and historian Paul M. Bardunias observe that Plataea was the first battle since Thermopylai and the last battle ever where the Persian Immortals fought the Spartan hoplites. They argue that multiple features of a typical hoplite battle are missing in Herodotus' narrative of Plataea, however, later authors have guessed they were. They argue that the general narrative of Plataea as a phalanx battle is contrary to the evidence. They note that Herodotus had provided any details about the depth of the Greek ranks at Plataea, but had written about the greater depth of the Persian ranks. They thus argue that the Greek forces at Plataea were not arrayed in grids, and did not fight in the manner of Classical hoplite phalanxes. They note that the Spartans at Plataea did not execute the movements attributed to them by later authors like Xenophon.

Konijnendijk and Bardunias argue that the helots were indeed deployed alongside the other Spartans during the final battle, and were not auxiliaries. They argue that the Spartan formation could not have been eight ranks deep with one hoplite in front and seven light infantry to the rear. They argue that such a line was 5 kilometres (3.1 mi) long, which is not possible on Plataea's terrain. They also observe that the Persian Immortals could not have formed a line of similar length. They note that the Spartan phalanxes were eight ranks deep in only one instance in recorded history. They argue that the Greeks formed a defensive line during the final battle, sent small groups out to provoke the Persians into breaking their formations, and only then did they start pushing like Classical hoplite phalanxes. They argue that the Greeks did not form tight phalanxes, and instead kept some distance between each soldier to allow individual soldiers to attack.

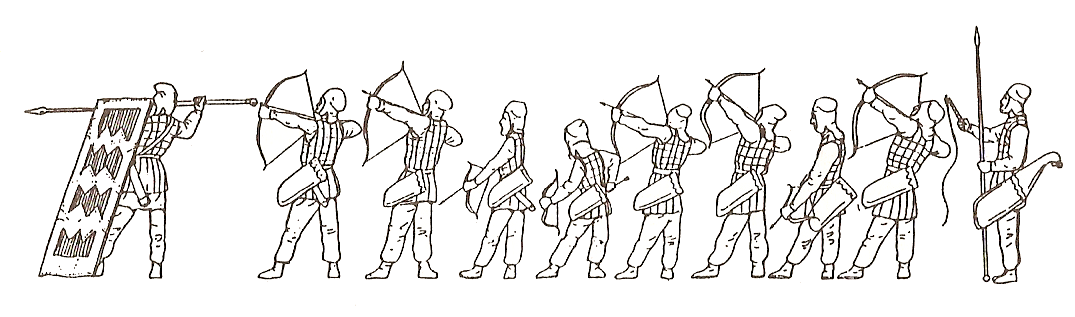
A typical Persian formation, ten ranks deep with sparabara (heavy infantry) in front, eight archers in the middle and a supervisor at the back.

Konijnendijk and Bardunias note that the Spartans may have arranged their units according to their syssitia (meal groups). They argue that the Spartan line had a depth of four ranks, while some other columns on the line had greater depth, arrayed together in a "rough formation". They posit that the Persians lost because of overspecialization. They postulate that Plataea was a battle of shield walls, where the Greeks won because their shield wall was capable of movement, sending out skirmishers and moving in on their opponent. The Persian shield wall, in contrast, was better for shielding archers, missileers and cavalry. They observe that the sparabara (heavy infantry) were the only Persians who could face off against the hoplites in close quarters, and when the former were defeated, the outmatched light infantry had to fight the hoplites. They note that the Persians could not retreat quickly, and their cavalry, which could have assaulted the Greek flanks, did not engage, perhaps because of adverse terrain. The battle of shield walls at Plataea, according to them, was a phase in the development of Greek combat, where it morphed from "fluid" combat in Archaic Greece into Classical hoplite phalanxes.

=== Casualties ===
The Greek casualties at Plataea were 652 according to Herodotus, 1,360 according to Plutarch and 10,000 according to Diodorus. Konecny notes that the second estimate indicated a casualty rate of 4% for the Greeks. Herodotus probably could not estimate the total casualties among the Spartan perioikoi. He had also estimated that there were a total of 52 Athenian casualties. The Greek writer Cleidemus had posited that Herodotus had come across a memorial to the casualties incurred by the phyle (tribe) of Aiantis, and assumed these were the total Athenian casualties. The historians Michael A. Flower and John A. Marincola argue that Herodotus had given the Greek casualties only for the final day of the battle. The historian Peter Hunt notes that Herodotus did not state the casualties incurred by the perioikoi, and argues that they could not have emerged unscathed from the Persian arrow volleys.

== Bibliography ==
=== Modern sources ===
==== Research papers, journal articles, and theses ====
- Hunt, Peter (1997). "Helots at the Battle of Plataea". Historia: Zeitschrift für Alte Geschichte. 46 (2: 2nd Quarter): 129–144. JSTOR 4436459.
- Huxley, George (1967). "The Medism of Caryae" (PDF). Greek, Roman and Byzantine Studies. 8 (1): 29–32. Archived from the original on 4 December 2024.
- Jones, Robert Thomas (2019). The Prospect of Reconstructing Ancient Battlefields in the 21st Century: A Case Study using the Battle of Plataea (479 B.C.E.) (PhD thesis). University of Newcastle. hdl:1959.13/1410875. Archived from the original (PDF) on 22 December 2024.
- Kissinger, April; Shea, Eric; Lee, Chelsea; Wright, Sterling (2024-03-27). "Stoa of Zeus (Eleutherios): A Pleiades Place Resource". Pleiades: a gazetteer of past places. Jeffrey Becker, Adam Rabinowitz, Tom Elliott, Chris de Lisle. Archived from the original on 2024-08-09.
- Konijnendijk, Roel (2012). "'Neither the Less Valorous nor the Weaker': Persian Military Might and the Battle of Plataia" (PDF). Historia: Zeitschrift für Alte Geschichte. 61 (10): 1–17. doi:10.25162/historia-2012-0001. hdl:1887/66873. JSTOR 41342866. Archived from the original on 15 August 2021.
- Madden, Thomas F. (2017). "17.05.02, Stephenson, The Serpent Column". The Medieval Review. ISSN 1096-746X. Archived from the original on 2024-09-04.
- Mozhajsky, Andrej (2017). "Reconsidering the Movement of Pausanias' Army Before the Battle of Plataiai in 479 BC". Revue internationale d'histoire militaire ancienne. 5: 33–50. ISBN 9782252041123.
- Müller, Christel (2024). "Plataean Remembrances: The Monuments of the Battle from the Imperial Period [and] Backwards". Classica et Mediaevalia. Supplement 1: 17–42. doi:10.7146/classicaetmediaevalia.vi1.145227.
- Nyland, Ray (1992). "Herodotos' Sources for the Plataiai Campaign". L'Antiquité Classique. 61: 80–97. doi:10.3406/antiq.1992.1132. JSTOR 41654955. Archived from the original on 9 December 2024.
- Vesterinen, Jamie (2022). "Generals' Dreams before Battle: An overview of a Recurring Motif in Ancient Historiography (4th c. BC – 3rd c. AD)" (pdf). Arctos: Acta Philologica Fennica. 56: 127–188. eISSN 2814-855X. Archived from the original on 22 December 2024.
- Young Jr., Theodore Cuyler (1980). "480/479 B.C. - A Persian Perspective". Iranica Antiqua. 15: 213–239. ProQuest 1297864529.

==== Books ====
- Burn, Andrew Robert (1966). The Pelican History of Greece. Penguin Books. ISBN 9780140207927.
- Cawkwell, George (2005). The Greek Wars: The Failure of Persia. Oxford University Press. doi:10.1093/oso/9780198148715.001.0001. ISBN 9780198148715.
- Connolly, Peter (2012). Greece and Rome at War. Frontline Books. ISBN 9781848326095.
- Delbrück, Hans (1990). Warfare in Antiquity. History of the Art of War. Vol. 1. Translated by Renfroe Jr., Walter J. University of Nebraska Press. ISBN 9780803291997.
- Fehling, Detlev (1971). Die Quellenangaben bei Herodot: Studien zur Erzählkunst Herodots [The Sources of Herodotus: Studies of Herodotus' Narrative Art]. Untersuchungen zur antiken Literatur und Geschichte [Studies in Ancient Literature and History] (in German). Vol. 9. De Gruyter. doi:10.1515/9783110841930. ISBN 9783110036343.
- Flower, Michael A.; Marincola, John (2002). Herodotus. Histories Book IX. Cambridge Greek and Latin Classics. Cambridge University Press. ISBN 9780521596503.
- Green, Peter (1996). The Greco-Persian Wars. University of California Press. doi:10.1525/9780520917064. ISBN 9780520203136.
- Hignett, Charles (1963). Xerxes' Invasion of Greece. Clarendon Press. ISBN 9780198142478.
- Jung, Michael (2006). Gehrke, Hans-Joachim (ed.). Marathon und Plataiai: Zwei Perserschlachten als »lieux de mémoire« im antiken Griechenland [Marathon and Plataiai: Two Persian Battles as “lieux de mémoire” in Ancient Greece]. Hypomnemata: Untersuchungen zur Antike und zu ihrem Nachleben [Hypomnemata: Studies on Antiquity and its Afterlife] (in German). Vol. 164. Vandenhoeck & Ruprecht. doi:10.13109/9783666252631. ISBN 978-3-666-25263-1.
- Lazenby, John Francis (1993). The Defence of Greece, 490-479 B.C. Aris & Phillips. ISBN 9780856685910.
- Lupi, Marcello (2017). "Sparta and the Persian Wars, 499–478". In Powell, Anton (ed.). A Companion to Sparta. John Wiley & Sons. pp. 269–290. doi:10.1002/9781119072379.ch10. ISBN 9781405188692.
- Rahe, Paul (2015). The Grand Strategy of Classical Sparta: The Persian Challenge. Yale Library of Military History. Yale University Press. doi:10.12987/9780300218602. ISBN 978-0-300-11642-7. JSTOR j.ctvmd857x.
- Roisman, Joseph; Worthington, Ian (2011). A Companion to Ancient Macedonia. Blackwell Companions to the Ancient World. John Wiley & Sons. doi:10.1002/9781444327519. ISBN 9781444351637.
- Shepherd, William (2012). Plataea 479 BC: The Most Glorious Victory Ever Seen. Osprey Campaign Series. Vol. 239. Osprey Publishing. ISBN 9781849085540.

=== Book chapters ===
- de Jong, Irene J. F.; Versluys, Miguel John, eds. (2024). Reading Greek and Hellenistic-Roman Spolia: Objects, Appropriation and Cultural Change. Euhormos: Greco-Roman Studies in Anchoring Innovation. Vol. 5. Brill. doi:10.1163/9789004682702. ISBN 978-90-04-68270-2.
  - de Jong, Irene J. F. "Herodotus’ Framing of the Persian Spolia at Plataea". In de Jong & Versluys (2024), pp. 71–86.
  - van Rookhuijzen, Jan Zacharias. "Herodotus and the Persian Spoils on the Acropolis of Athens". In de Jong & Versluys (2024), pp. 87–107.
  - Vout, Caroline. "‘Spolia’ as Category: Greek and Roman Perspectives". In de Jong & Versluys (2024), pp. 265–283.
- Konecny, Andreas (2016). "Die Schlacht von Plataiai: Neues zur Topographie des Gefechts" [The Battle of Plataiai: New Information on the Topography of the Battle]. In Blakolmer, Fritz; Seyer, Martin; Szemethy, Hubert D. (eds.). Angekommen auf Ithaka: Festgabe für Jürgen Borchhardt zum 80. Geburtstag [Arrived in Ithaca. Presented to Jürgen Borchhardt on his 80th birthday] (in German). Phoibos Verlag. pp. 87–98. ISBN 978-3-85161-147-2.
- Konecny, Andreas (2017). "Masistios (Hdt. 9, 20-25). Der persische Reiterangriff auf die erste Position der Griechen bei Plataiai" [Masistios (Hdt. 9, 20-25). The Persian Cavalry Attack on the First Position of the Greeks in Plataea]. Havva İşkan'a Armağan. LYKIARKHISSA: Festschrift für Havva İşkan [A Gift to Havva İşkan. LYKIARKHISSA: Festschrift for Havva İşkan.] (in German). Ege Yayınları. pp. 519–532. ISBN 978-605-9680-26-4.
- Konecny, Andreas; Sekunda, Nicholas (2022). The Battle of Plataiai 479 BC. Phoibos Verlag. ISBN 9783851612714.
  - Gaebel, Robert. "The Boiotian Cavalry". In Konecny & Sekunda (2022), pp. 243–248.
  - Konecny, Andreas. "The Battle of Plataeiai. Topography and Tactics". In Konecny & Sekunda (2022), pp. 167–210.
  - Konijnendijk, Roel; Bardunias, Paul M. "The Face of Battle at Plataiai". In Konecny & Sekunda (2022), pp. 211–242.
  - Macgregor-Morris, Ian (2022a). "Pausanias, Best of Men: Politics, Propaganda, and Memory". In Konecny & Sekunda (2022), pp. 79–132.
  - Macgregor-Morris, Ian (2022b). "Aristeides the Just?". In Konecny & Sekunda (2022), pp. 133–152.
  - Sekunda, Nicholas. "Greek Logistics at Plataiaei and Strategical Planning during the Third Invasion of Greece (480 – 479 BC)". In Konecny & Sekunda (2022), pp. 153–166.
- Lupi, Marcello (2006). "Amompharetos, the lochos of Pitane and the Spartan System of Villages". In Hodkinson, Stephen; Powell, Anton (eds.). Sparta & War. The Classical Press of Wales. pp. 185–218. doi:10.2307/j.ctvvnb23.9. ISBN 978-1-910589-54-0. JSTOR j.ctvvnb23.9.
- Millender, Ellen (2024). "The Perils of Victory: Sparta's Uneasy Relationship with the Profits of War". In Rosenbloom, David; Pomeroy, Arthur J.; Armstrong, Jeremy (eds.). Money, Warfare and Power in the Ancient World: Studies in Honour of Matthew Freeman. Bloomsbury Academic. pp. 73–104. ISBN 978-1-3502-8377-0.
