= Amompharetus =

Spartan soldier (d. 479 BC)

Amompharetus or Amompheretus, son of Poliadas, was a Spartan General at the Battle of Plataea in 479 BC. The name means "of irreproachable valor".

Before the battle, both the Greek and Persian armies camped in front of each other for 10 days on the plain of Plateaea, with only small raids on each side. However, the Persians diverted the Greek water supply and cut off their supply of food, so the Greeks were forced to find a new camp.

The plan was for the main contingent of Greeks to set out first during the night, with the Spartans guarding the rear. After the main contingent of Greeks had left the encampment, and it was time for the Spartans to set off to take up the rear, Amompharetus refused to leave the field without a fight, insisting that the unalterable law of Sparta forbade retreat from the battlefield. It took some convincing and rank-pulling on behalf of the Spartan regent, Pausanias, and a not inconsiderable amount of time, to compel Amompharetus and his unit to follow the maneuvering of the rest of the army.

On discovering the Greeks had abandoned their positions and their Spartan allies, the leader of the Persian forces, Mardonius, launched an attack in haste. The Persian offensive was in disarray before battle was joined, and Mardonius soon lay dead and the Persian army crushed.

After the battle was over, Amompharetus was found dead, having been killed during the fighting.

There is another mention of Amompharetus (in Plutarch's Solon) as one of the five Spartans arbitrating the dispute over the island of Salamis between the citizens of Athens and Megara. The verdict was in favor of Athens.
