= Attaginus =

5th-century Theban politician

Attaginus (Ancient Greek: Ἀτταγῖνος), son of Phrynon, was one of the leading Theban oligarchs, who betrayed their city to Xerxes I on the Second Persian invasion of Greece, and took an active part in favour of the Persians. He invited Mardonius and 50 of the noblest Persians in his army to a splendid banquet at Thebes, shortly before the Battle of Plataea in 479 BC. After the battle, the Greeks marched against Thebes, and required Attaginos and Timegenidas, and other members of the Persian party, to be delivered up to them. This was at first refused; but, after the city had been besieged for twenty days, his fellow-citizens determined to comply with the demands of the Greeks. On these terms they made an agreement, but Attaginus escaped from the town. His sons were seized, but Pausanias of Sparta held them free of guilt, saying that the sons were not accessory to the treason. The rest of traitors were put to death at Corinth.
