= Masistius =

Persian cavalry leader at Plataea

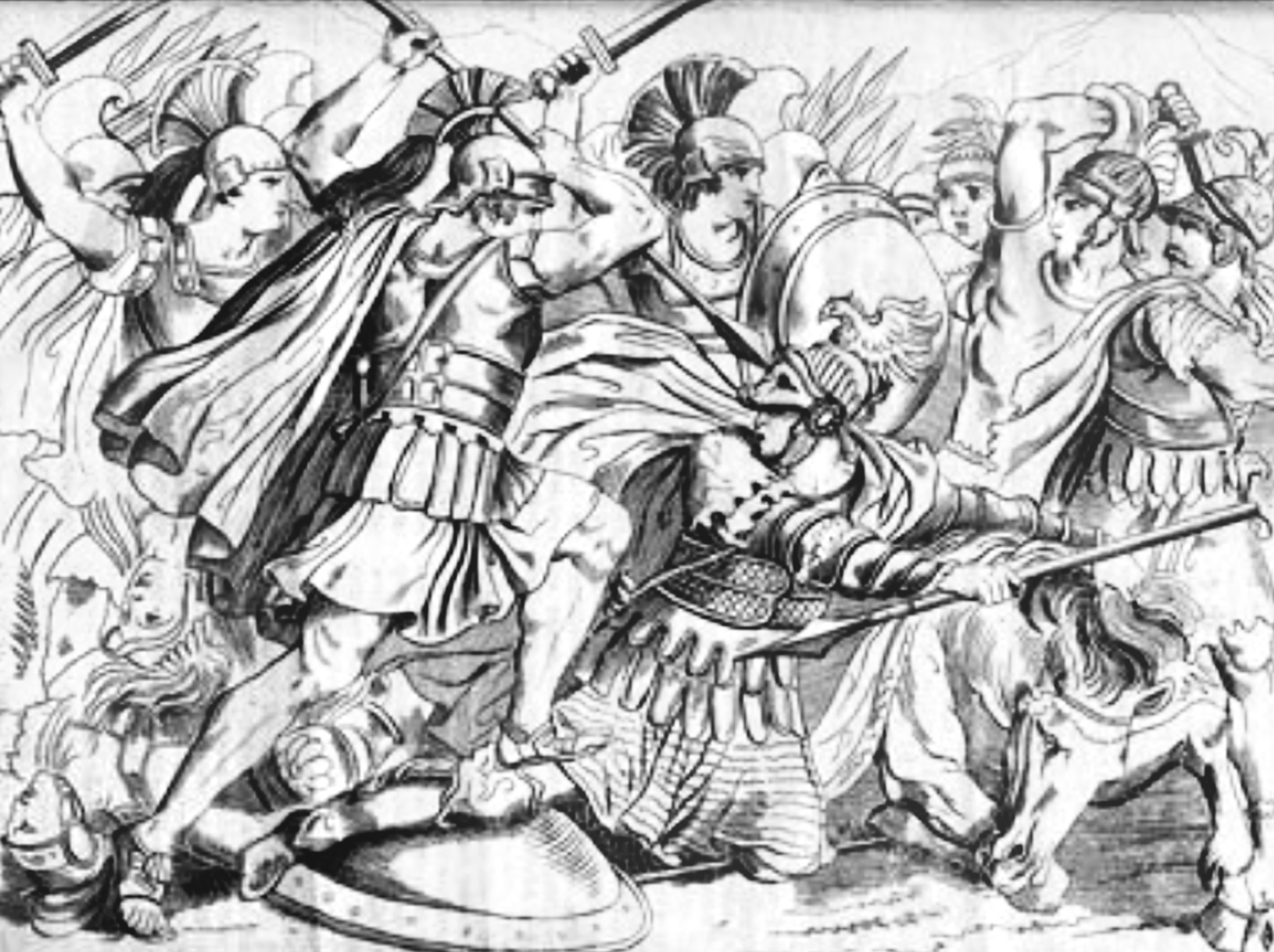
Death of Masistius.

Masistius (Μασίστιος to the Greeks) was a Persian cavalry commander best known for his role in the second Persian invasion of Greece.

== Biography ==
Masistius was the son of a man named Siromitras. He was reportedly a very tall and handsome man. He became a distinguished officer in the Persian army during Xerxes's invasion of Greece and gained great popularity among the troops. He died shortly before the Battle of Plataea, placing his death at some time during 479 BC. His death was keenly felt by the Persians. He was related to Mardonius, son in law of king Xerxes.

== Role in the Second Persian Invasion ==
Masistius is first mentioned as the commander of the Saspirian and Alarodian contingents of Xerxes's army which had been gathered for the second invasion of Greece. Masistius would have been appointed to this position by the senior commanders of the Persian army. It would have been Masistius's responsibility to appoint officers to command the squads into which the Saspirian and Alarodian contingents would have been divided. These contingents commanded by Masistius were probably infantry contingents equipped with small rawhide shields, short spears and swords, rather than cavalry.

At this stage, it appears that Masistius was not of any especially great significance to the invasion force as he appears in Herodotus simply as "Masistius, the son of Siromitras" with no further description, and as part of Herodotus's detailed description of Xerxes's army, the infantry section alone of which lasts from chapter 61-83 of book VII. However, by 479B C in the build up to the Battle of Plataea, Masistius's fortunes seem to have changed and he had become a senior and distinguished cavalry commander in the Persian forces which had remained in Greece under Mardonius. On two occasions, Herodotus notes the fine quality of Masistius's possessions, further suggesting his successes before Plataea.

As the Greek forces at Plataea under Pausanias did not want to attack the Persians for fear of the Persian cavalry and the Persians did not want to attack the Greeks who held the high-ground, Mardonius sent Masistius to harry the Greek forces. Masistius performed well, causing considerable casualties on the Greek forces through a series of hit and run attacks. However, as Masistius led from the front, the Greeks were able to kill him, inflicting a considerable blow to the Persians.

== Death ==
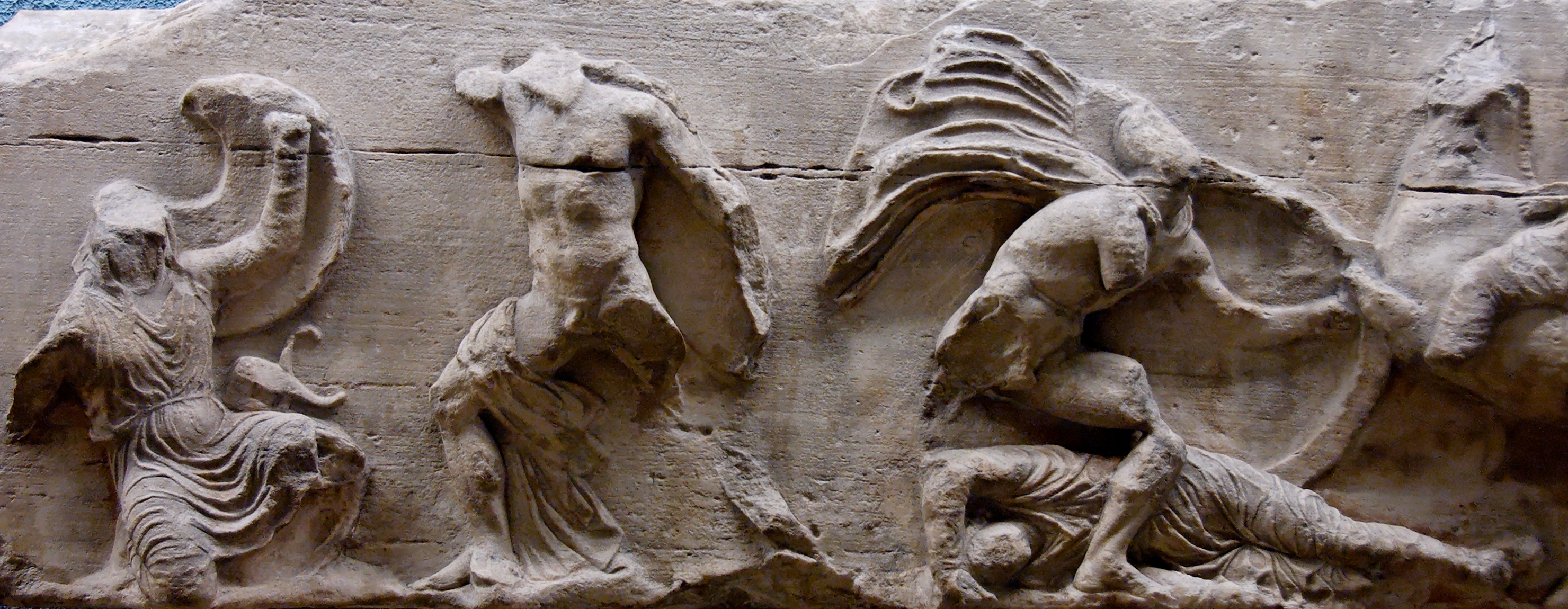
Scene of the Battle of Plataea on the south frieze of the Temple of Athena Nike, Athens. The scene on the right may show the fight over the body of Masistius. 430-400 BC. British Museum.

During Masistius's conflict with the Greeks in the build up to the Battle of Plataea, Masistius engaged the Megarians. He was so successful against them that the Megarians called for help from the other Greeks. In response, the Megarians received the support of 300 hoplites from Athens led by Olympiodorus along with a contingent of Athenian archers. One of these archers managed to shoot Masistius's horse in the flank, causing Masistius to fall from his mount. Once down, the Athenians set upon him, finally killing him by stabbing him through the eye. When the Persian cavalry fell back, they noticed Masistius was missing and attempted to recover his body. They temporarily achieved this until still more Greek forces arrived to support the beleaguered Athenians and Megarians, at which point the cavalry were forced to retreat and the Greeks were left in control of the body.

Masistius's loss was felt keenly by the Persians, who shaved their heads and cut the manes of their horses as signs of mourning. The death was reported to Mardonious who expressed grief at the loss. For the Greeks this was a considerable triumph and did much to boost the morale of the Greek allied forces. The Greeks put Masistius's body on a cart and paraded it in front of the Greek forces so they could see him. The Persian forces only advanced towards Plataea in response to the Greek maneuvers after they had finished mourning Masistius's death.

== Ancient Sources ==
Herodotus's The Histories is our main source for Masistius. Herodotus mentions him in book VII (but only as a passing reference) and book IX where the majority of our information on Masistius resides. Diodorus of Sicily also recounts the Persian cavalry attack and the death of Masistius in his work The Library but he never refers to him by name, instead referring to the "commander of the cavalry".

== Bibliography ==
- Angeliki Petropoulou, "The Death of Masistios and the Mourning for his Loss," in Seyed Mohammad Reza Darbandi, Antigoni Zournatzi (ed.), Ancient Greece and Ancient Iran: Cross-Cultural Encounters. 1st International Conference (Athens, 11–13 November 2006) (Athens: National Hellenic Research Foundation; Hellenic National Commission for UNESCO; Cultural Center of the Embassy of the Islamic Republic of Iran, 2008), 9-30.
