= Sphendale =

Deme

Sphendale (Ancient Greek: Σφενδάλη) was a deme of ancient Attica at which Persian general Mardonius halted on his route from Deceleia to Tanagra. In the territory of Sphendale there was a hill, named Hyacinthus.

Its site is unlocated.
