= Overspecialization =

When a person works in an excessively narrow occupation

Overspecialization is when a person works in an excessively narrow occupation or scientific field.

== Effects ==
=== In work ===
In the workplace, specialization of labor is used to divide up the workload in a manner that improves efficiency. However, holders of overspecialized positions tend to perform repetitive jobs, leading to boredom, dissatisfaction, and lower-quality output.

==== In medicine ====
The breadth of medical knowledge has expanded vastly since the 1980s. It has been argued that specialization is necessary in medicine to divide up the vast knowledge needed to tackle certain classes of diseases, such as cancer. However, specializing too narrowly leads to poor training; unnecessary health care; low-quality care, especially in regions with poor medical infrastructure; and knowledge that can rapidly become outdated. Overspecialization detracts from physicians' ability to identify and treat problems in patients. One proposed solution is to use databases that streamline the obtaining of necessary information and knowledge, while teaching medicine to a depth that the human mind can handle.

=== In academia ===
Modern universities offer a large number of academic majors where students can pursue research. However, overspecialization is considered to be a serious problem in research because it prevents academics from assessing the relationship between different fields in order to solve certain problems.

The Ph.D system has been criticized for encouraging overspecialization, which can leave students ill-prepared for corporate jobs.
