= Agiad dynasty =

Royal family of ancient Sparta

Agiads Ἀγιάδαι
- An image of a Spartan shield design
- Parent family: Heraclids (mythical)
- Country: Sparta
- Founded: c. 10th century BC
- Founder: Eurysthenes (mythical); Agis I (historical)
- Final ruler: Agesipolis III
- Titles: King of Sparta
- Connected families: Eurypontids
- Deposition: 215 BC

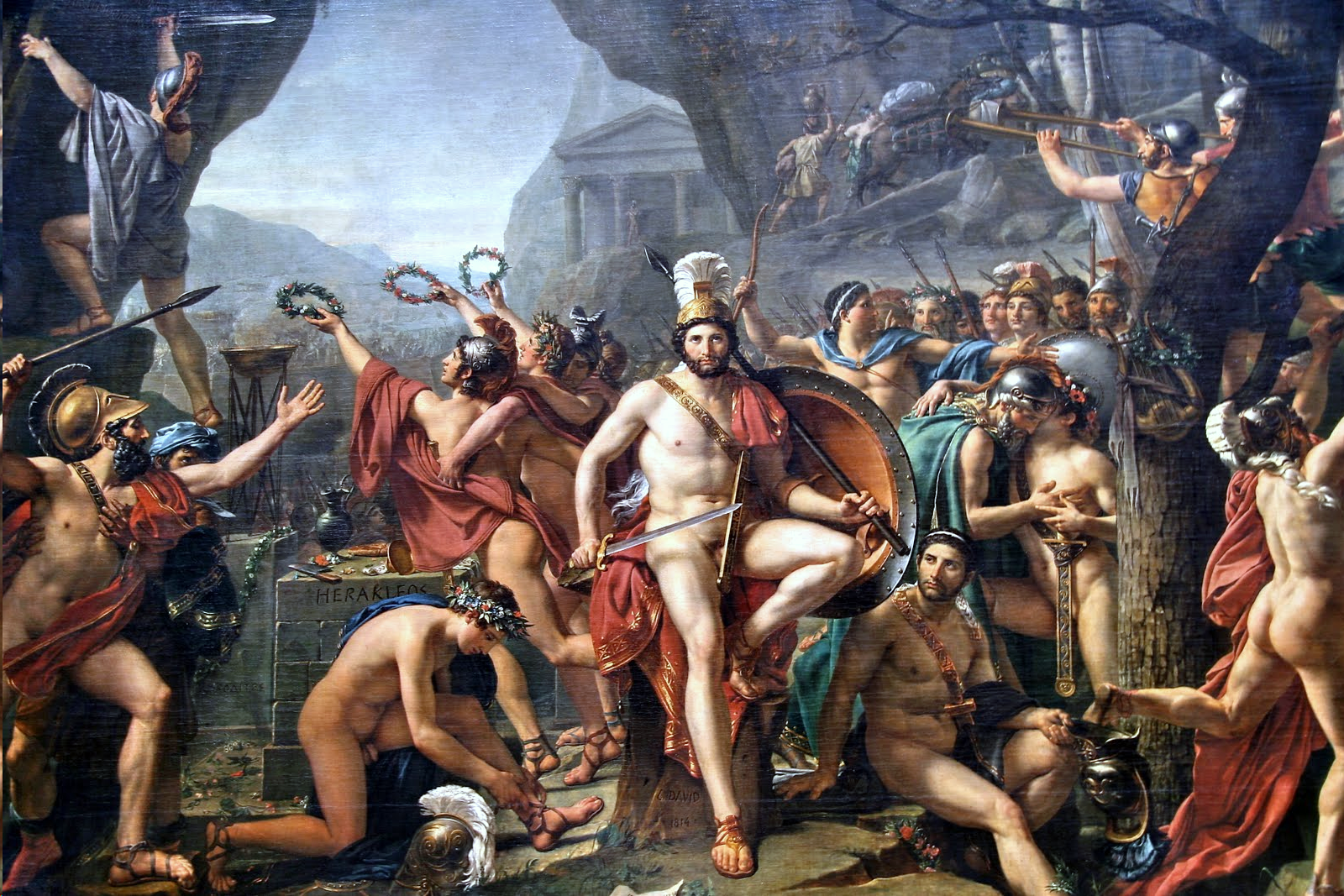
Leonidas at Thermopylae (1814) by Jacques-Louis David

The Agiad dynasty (Ancient Greek: Ἀγιάδαι, Agiádai) was one of the two royal families of the ancient Greek city-state of Sparta. They ruled jointly along with the Eurypontid dynasty, possibly from the 8th century BC onwards, being the senior of the two houses. The alleged founder of the dynasty was Agis I, possibly the first king of Sparta at the end of the 10th century BC, who subsequently gave his name to the dynasty. The two lines, who maintained an enduring rivalry, were, according to tradition, respectively descended from the twins Eurysthenes and Procles, both descendants of Heracles. The most famous member of the Agiad dynasty was Leonidas I, known for his heroic death at the Battle of Thermopylae in 480 BC. The last Agiad king was Agesipolis III, deposed by the Eurypontid Lycurgus in 215 BC.

== History ==
In order to explain the peculiarity of the Spartan two kings, the Spartans elaborated a legend saying that Aristodemos—the first king of Sparta—had twins, Eurysthenes and Prokles. Since the Spartans did not know who was born first, they opted for a diarchy, a college of two kings with the same power; Eurysthenes being the first Agiad, Prokles the first Eurypontid.

Modern scholars consider instead Agis I and Eurypon to be the founders of each dynasty, as they give their name to their descendants, not the mythical twins. The two dynasties were however not related until the Hellenistic era and the Eurypontids reached royal status much later than the Agiads. As a result, in order to balance the two royal lines, several names were inserted in the list of Eurypontid kings, such as Soos (meaning "stability"), Prytanis and Eunomos (said to have ruled at the same time as Lycurgus). Thus, while the Agiads may have ruled since the late 10th century, the Eurypontids likely gained kingship only by the early 8th century at the earliest.

It is probable that the two dynasties came to rule jointly under the kings Archelaus (Agiad) and Charilaus (Eurypontid) in the 8th century, as a result of the synoecism that created the polis of Sparta. The city was composed of five villages (Pitana, Mesoa, Limnai, Kynosoura, Amyklai), the latter of which merged with the other four after the initial synoecism. The Agiads had their burial ground located in Pitana, while the Eurypontids were in Limnai, which suggest that the dual monarchy was created when the four villages merged. Archelaus and Charilaus are the first kings of Sparta that are considered together in ancient sources: following the oracle of Delphi, they destroyed and conquered Aigys, in the northwest of Sparta. The connection of the Spartan kings with Heracles likely dates of the same period, which also witnessed the construction of the Menelaion, a heroon to Menelaus.

The genealogies given by the Greek writers Herodotus and Pausanias remain highly suspect before the 5th century, as it is not conceivably believable to have 16 direct successions (from father to son) from Eurystenes and Prokles. A lot of successions must have been collateral, especially when considering that of the 26 successions that took place after 491, only 14 were from father to son. Moreover, ancient chronologies produce an average length of 40 years per reign, which is far too long and a consequence of the descent from Herakles myth. Paul Cartledge suggest an average length of 30 years per generation, thus giving a regnal date of c. 930–900 for Agis I, founder of the Agiads. These dates relate well with the archaeological evidence.

== Members ==
Spartan kings are shown in bold, all dates BC.

- **Eurysthenes**, elder twin son of Aristodemus. He was invented by the Spartans in order to push back the date of the Dorian conquest of Laconia, as well as to explain the origin of the Spartan diarchy.
- Lathria, wife of Eurystenes, daughter of Thersander, another Heraclid, and twin sister of Anaxandra, the wife of Prokles, the twin brother of her husband.
- **Agis I**, allegedly son of Eurysthenes and eponym of the Agiad dynasty. Some modern historians consider he could have been the first historical king of Sparta, with a reign dating from c.930–c.900.
- **Echestratus**, allegedly son of Agis I, with a reign perhaps dated from the beginning of the 9th century, c.900–c.870.
- Lycurgus, mythical reformer of Sparta. He is found as the son of Agis I, brother of Echestratus and regent for his nephew Labotas in Herodotus. Modern scholars thinks Herodotus reproduced an attempt from the Agiads to poach him from the Eurypontids.
- **Labotas**, allegedly son of Echestratus, with a reign hypothetically dated from c.870–c.840.
- **Doryssus**, allegedly son of Labotas, with a reign hypothetically dated from c.840–c.815.
- **Agesilaus I**, allegedly son of Doryssus, with a reign hypothetically dated from c.815–c.785.
- **Archelaus**, allegedly son of Agesilaus I, with a reign hypothetically dated from c.785–c.760. He was perhaps the first Agiad king to reign alongside a Eurypontid (Charilaus).
- **Teleclus**, allegedly son of Archelaus, king perhaps dated from c. 760–c.740. He was reputedly murdered by Messenians.
- **Alcmenes**, allegedly son of Agesilaus I, with a reign possibly dated from c.740–c.700.
- **Polydorus**, allegedly son of Teleclus, king in the first half of the 7th century. He was described as a revolutionary king, pushing for a land-reform, but was murdered by an opponent named Polemarchus.
- **Eurycrates**, allegedly son of Polydorus, with a reign possibly dated from c.665–c.640.
- **Anaxander**, allegedly son of Eurycrates, with a reign possibly dated from c.640–c.615.
- Leandris, wife of Anaxander and mother of Eurycratidas.
- **Eurycratides**, son of Anaxander, king from c.615 to c.590.
- **Leon**, son of Eurycratides, king from c.590 to c.560.
- **Anaxandridas II**, son of Leon, king from c.560 to 524. He was married to his niece, but as he remained sonless, he married a second time. From his second wife, he had Cleomenes I; then he returned to his first wife and had three sons in quick succession: Dorieus, Leonidas I and Cleombrotus, the latter two perhaps as twins.
- **Cleomenes I**, first son of Anaxandridas II, king from 524 to 490. He engineered the deposition of the Eurypontid Damaratus in 491, for which he was sent into exile. He was recalled soon after, but was possibly murdered by his half-brother Leonidas I.
- Dorieus, second son of Anaxandridas II. He challenged the claim of his half-brother Cleomenes I when their father died. Refusing to be ruled by him, he moved to colonial ventures in Libya and Sicily, where he died c.510.
- **Leonidas I**, third son of Anaxandridas II, king from 490 to 480. He famously died in the Battle of Thermopylae.
- Cleombrotus, fourth son of Anaxandridas II, died in 479. He was regent for Pleistarchus in 480, and died just before the Battle of Plataea in 479.
- Gorgo, daughter of Cleomenes I, she married her uncle Leonidas I. Mother of Pleistarchus.
- Alkathoa, wife of Cleombrotus, mother of Pausanias and Nicomedes.
- Euryanax, son of Dorieus, perhaps illegitimate. He fought at the Battle of Plataea.
- **Pleistarchus**, son of Leonidas and Gordo, king between 480 and 459.
- Pausanias "the Regent", first son of Cleombrotus and Alkathoa, regent of his nephew Pleistarchus in 479. Although he won the Battle of Plataea, he was suspected of Medism and executed by the ephors.
- Nicomedes, second son of Cleombrotus and Alkathoa, regent of his nephew Pleistoanax in 458. He won the Battle of Tanagra in 457.
- **Pleistoanax**, first son of Pausanias the regent, king between 459 and 409. He was exiled for 18 years for having allegedly taken a bribe from the Athenian Pericles, between 445 and 427. His son Pausanias reigned meanwhile. He returned to Sparta in 427 and reigned until his death in 409.
- Cleomenes, second son of Pausanias the regent, regent himself of his nephew Pausanias when his brother Pleistoanax was in exile.
- Aristocles, third son of Pausanias the Regent. He helped his brother Pleistoanax to bribe the Pythia in order to secure his return from exile. He later fought in the Battle of Mantinea in 418.
- **Pausanias**, son of Pleistoanax, king for a first time during the exile of his father between 445 and 427. His reign resumed on the death of his father in 409, until 395 when he had to go into exile. He also wrote historical treaties during his exile.
- **Agesipolis I**, first son of Pausanias, king from 395 to 380. As he was still a minor in 395, Aristodemus became his regent. He died in Chalkidice in the summer of 380.
- **Cleombrotus I**, second son of Pausanias, king from 380 to 371. He died at the Battle of Leuctra.
- Aristodemus, regent for Agesipolis I in 395, he won the Battle of Nemea in 394.
- **Agesipolis II**, first son of Cleombrotus I, king from 371 to 370.
- **Cleomenes II**, second son of Cleombrotus I, king from 370 to 309.
- Acrotatus, first son of Cleomenes II, died before his father. He notably fought the tyrant Agathocles in Sicily c.314.
- Cleonymus, second son of Cleomenes II, he might have contested the claim of his nephew Areus I in 309, but became his regent instead. He had a long career as general for Sparta and as mercenary, in Italy, Crete, Corcyra, Messenia, etc. After his wife Chilonis left him for Acrotatus (Areus' son) c.275, he went into exile in Epirus and fought against Sparta during Pyrrhus' invasion of the Peloponnese in 272.
- **Areus I**, son of Acrotatus, king from 309 to c.265. He notably transformed Sparta into a Hellenistic kingdom, but died before the walls of Corinth during the Chremonidean War.
- **Acrotatus**, son of Areus, king from c.265 to c.262. His affair with Chilonis triggered the defection of Cleonymus to Epirus. He died before Megalopolis at the end of the Chremonidean War c.262.
- Chilonis, a woman of the Eurypontid dynasty, first betrothed to Cleonymus, she left him to marry the future king Acrotatus.
- **Areus II**, son of Acrotatus and Chilonis, king from c.262 to 254. He was born after his father's death and died at 8 years old; his cousin Leonidas was his regent throughout his reign.
- **Leonidas II**, son of Cleonymus, king from 254 to c.236, regent of Areus II before his accession. In his youth, he served in the court of Seleucus I. He was forced into exile by the Eurypontid king Agis IV between 243 and 241.
- Cratesiclea, wife of Leonidas II. She married Megistonos after the death of Leonidas. She went into exile in Egypt with her son Cleomenes III and was killed there in 219.
- **Cleombrotus II**, put on the throne by the Eurypontid Agis IV to replace Leonidas II forced into exile in 243–241, but in turn went into exile when Leonidas was restored. He was the son-in-law of Leonidas II, but his relationship with the other Agiads is uncertain.
- Chilonis, daughter of Leonidas II, wife of Cleombrotus II. She followed her father into exile in 243, then her husband when he was in turn exiled in 241
- **Cleomenes III**, elder son of Leonidas II and Cratesiclea, king from c.236 to 222. He continued the social reforms of Agis IV, but was defeated by Macedonia at the Battle of Selasia in 222, after which he went into exile in Egypt. He unsuccessfully tried a coup against Ptolemy IV in 219, then committed suicide.
- Agiatis, wife of Cleomenes III, she had previously been married to Agis IV. She had one son from Agis (Eudamidas III) and at least two sons from Cleomenes, who are unknown.
- **Eucleidas**, second son of Leonidas II and Cratesiclea, he was appointed as co-king by his elder brother Cleomenes III in the place of the Eurypontid Archidamus V. He reigned between 227 and 222, when he died in the Battle of Sellasia.
- Agesipolis, son of Cleombrotus II and Chilonis.
- Cleomenes, son of Cleombrotus II and Chilonis. He was regent for his nephew Agesipolis III in 219.
- **Agesipolis III**, son of Agesipolis, grandson of Cleombrotus II, king in 219 at the death of Cleomenes III, but dethroned by the Eurypontid Lycurgus in 215. He was sent as envoy to Rome c.184, but killed by pirates on the way.

== Family tree ==
=== Agiad ===
Agiad dynasty

Legend
| Red | King of Sparta | Orange | Regent |

Eurysthenes | Lathria
Agis I c.930–c.900
Echestratus c.900–c.870
Labotas c.870–c.840
Doryssus c.840–c.815
Agesilaus I c.815–c.785
Archelaus c.785–c.760
Teleclus c. 760–c.740
Alcmenes c.740–c.700
Polydorus c.700–c.665
Eurycrates c.665-c.640
Anaxander c.640-c.615 | Leandris
Eurycratides c.615-c.590
Leon c.590-c.560
daughter
(2) | Anaxandridas II c.560–524 | (1)
Cleomenes I 524–490 | Dorieus
Gorgo | Leonidas I 490–480 | Cleombrotus | Alkathoa | Euryanax
Pleistarchus; 480–459 | Pausanias | Nicomedes
Pleistoanax; 459–409 | Cleomenes | Aristocles
Pausanias; 409–395
Agesipolis I 395–380 | Cleombrotus I 380–371
Agesipolis II; 371–370 | Cleomenes II; 370–309
Acrotatus | Cleonymus
Areus I 309–265
Acrotatus; 265–262 | Chilonis | Leonidas II; 254–242; 241-236 | Cratesiclea
Areus II; 262–254 | Cleombrotus II; 242–241 | Chilonis | Eucleidas; 227–222 | Cleomenes III; 236–222 | Agiatis
Cleomenes | Agesipolis | 2 sons
Agesipolis III; 219–215

== Bibliography ==
- David Asheri, Alan Lloyd, Aldo Corcella, A Commentary on Herodotus, Books 1–4, Oxford University Press, 2007. ISBN 978-0-19-814956-9
- John Boardman, I. E. S. Edwards, N. G. L. Hammond, L. Sollberger, The Cambridge Ancient History, vol. III, part 1, The Prehistory of the Balkans; and the Middle East and the Aegean world, tenth to eighth centuries B.C., Cambridge University Press, 1982. ISBN 0-521-22496-9
- W. den Boer, "Political Propaganda in Greek Chronology", Historia: Zeitschrift für Alte Geschichte, Bd. 5, H. 2 (Jun., 1956), pp. 162–177.
- Alfred S. Bradford, A Prosopography of Lacedaemonians from the Death of Alexander the Great, 323 B. C., to the Sack of Sparta by Alaric, A. D. 396, Munich, Beck, 1977. ISBN 3-406-04797-1
- John Briscoe, A Commentary on Livy: Books 34 - 37, Oxford, Clarendon Press, 1981. ISBN 978-0-19-814455-7
- Paul Cartledge, Agesilaos and the Crisis of Sparta, Baltimore, Johns Hopkins University Press, 1987. ISBN 978-0-7156-3032-7
- ——, Sparta and Lakonia, A Regional History 1300–362 BC, London, Routledge, 2002 (originally published in 1979). ISBN 0-415-26276-3
- —— & Antony Spawforth, Hellenistic and Roman Sparta, A tale of two cities, London and New York, Routledge, 2002 (originally published in 1989). ISBN 0-415-26277-1
- W. G. Forrest, A History of Sparta, New York, Norton, 1986. SBN 393004813
- Robin Hard, The Routledge Handbook of Greek Mythology: Based on H.J. Rose's "Handbook of Greek Mythology", London/New York, Routledge, 2004. ISBN 978-0-415-18636-0
- G. L. Huxley, "Problems in the "Chronography" of Eusebius", Proceedings of the Royal Irish Academy: Archaeology, Culture, History, Literature, 1982, Vol. 82C, pp. 183–196.
- E. I. McQueen, "The Eurypontid House in Hellenistic Sparta", Historia: Zeitschrift für Alte Geschichte, Bd. 39, H. 2 (1990), pp. 163–181.
- Victor Parker, "Some Dates In Early Spartan History", Klio, 75, 1993, pp. 45–60.
- Paul Poralla & Alfred S. Bradford, Prosopographie der Lakedaimonier, bis auf die Zeit Alexanders des Grossen, Chicago, 1985 (originally published in 1913). OCLC 1151065049
- Anton Powell (editor), A Companion to Sparta, Hoboken, Wiley, 2018. ISBN 978-1-4051-8869-2
- M. L. West, "Alcmanica", The Classical Quarterly, Vol. 15, No. 2 (Nov., 1965), pp. 188–202.
- Mary E. White, "Some Agiad Dates: Pausanias and His Sons", The Journal of Hellenic Studies, Vol. 84 (1964), pp. 140–152.
