= Euryanax =

Spartan joint-commander during the Battle of Plataea

Euryanax (Ancient Greek: Εὐρυάναξ, Euryánax') "eury" meaning wandering, and "anax" meaning king in Dorian, was a son of the Spartan prince Dorieus of the Agiad dynasty, as well as a joint-commander with Pausanias at the Battle of Plataea.

== Life ==
=== Kingship ===
Euryanax's father Dorieus left Sparta when his half-brother Cleomenes I became king around 516 BC, according to Herodotus, this is because he could not bear the thought of his brother ruling over him. Outraged that the Spartans preferred his leadership, he decided to start a failed colony in Africa. When Cleomenes I later died in 490 BC without male descendants, instead of Euryanax becoming king, Leonidas I, the son of the previous king, Anaxandridas II became the successor to the throne. There is speculation surrounding his ascension to kingship, as both Leonidas and Euryanax had fair claims.

=== Commandership ===
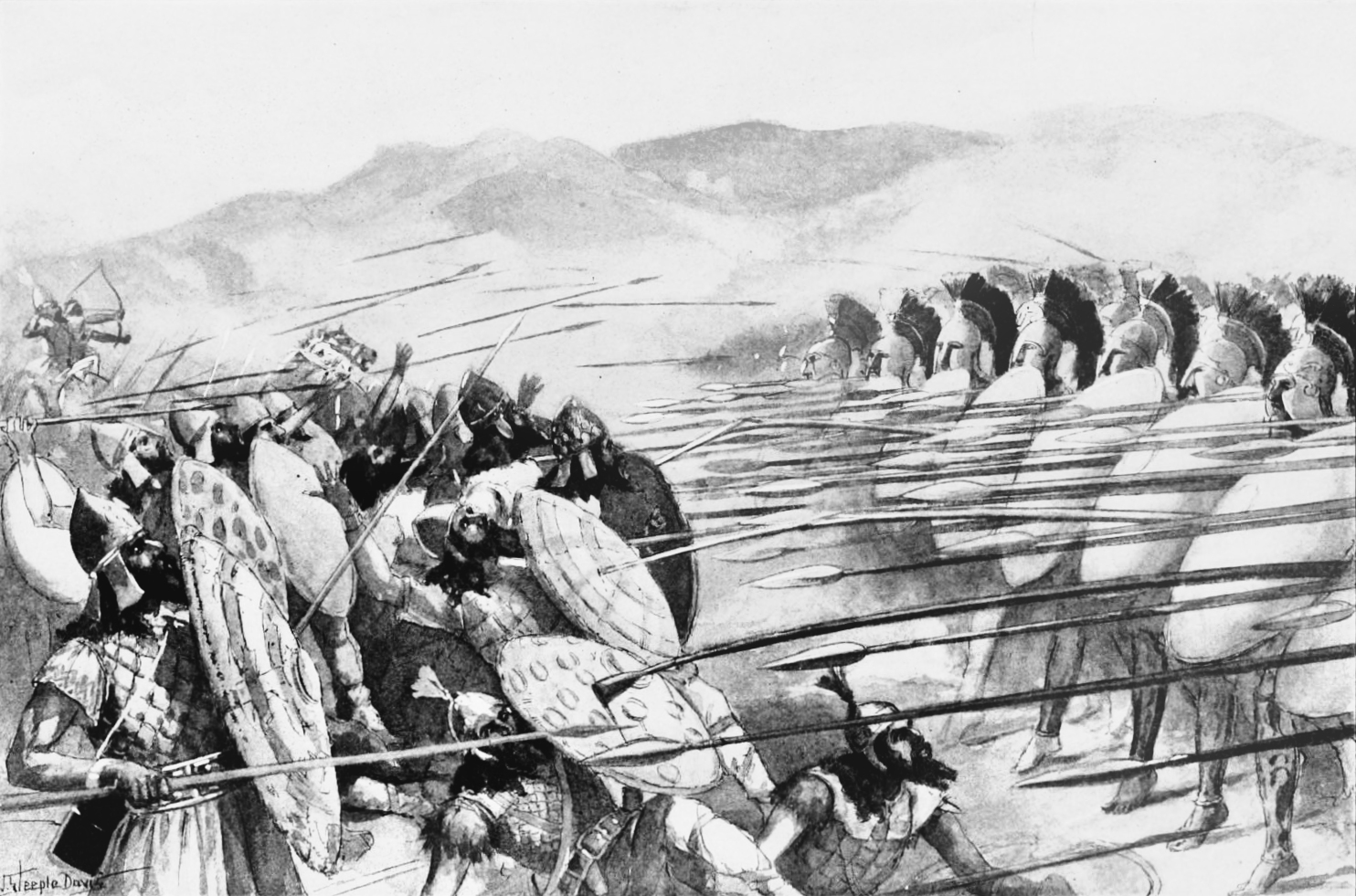
Scene of the Battle of Plataea, by J. Steeple Davis, where Euryanax was the second in command of the Spartans

In 480 BC Leonidas famously died in the Battle of Thermopylae against the Persians and was then succeeded by his son Pleistarchus. Since he was still a child, Pausanias and Euryanax led the Spartan army during the Battle of Plataea in 479 BC. During this combat, Euryanax was second in command.

Pausanias and Eurynax seemed to get along, sharing a hatred for a particularly hard-headed Spartan soldier and leader of the Pitanate battalion called Amompharetus. A battalion which Thucydides contends was not formally a part of the Spartan army. Amompharetus disobeyed all their orders publicly, disputed with them, and put his battalion in harms way during the battle. According to Herodotus, "Pausanias and Euryanax were outraged that Amompharetus disobeyed them" and "disliked that his refusing would compel them to abandon the Pitanate battalion." In the end however, the Battle of Plataea was successful for the Greeks, and they had halted the Persian advance.
