= Leon of Sparta =

King of Sparta

Leon
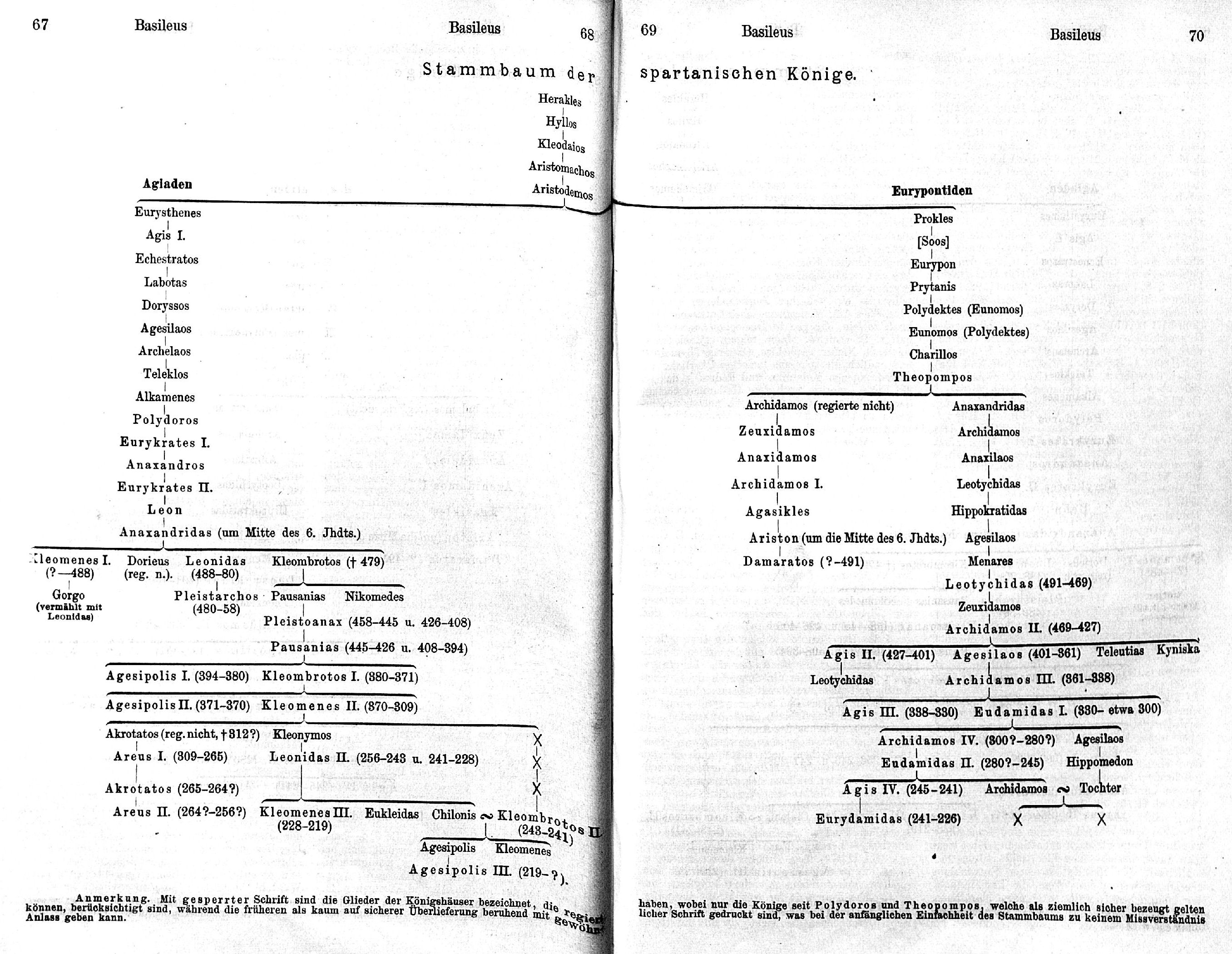
- Family tree of Leon

King of Sparta
- Reign: c. 590 – 560 BC
- Predecessor: Eurycratides
- Successor: Anaxandridas II
- Born: Sparta
- Issue: Anaxandridas II
- Father: Eurycratides

Leon (Ancient Greek: Λέων) was the 14th Agiad dynasty King of Sparta, ruling from 590 BC to 560 BC.

== Name ==
Leon means "lion". The grandson of Leon had a similar name: Leonidas.

== Biography ==
Leon is mentioned in the seventh book of The Histories by Herodotus.

He is said to have, like his father, fought to a draw with the Tegeans.

Grandfather to Leonidis (famous king)

== Family ==
Leon was the son of king Eurycratides and grandson of Anaxander.

He was succeeded on the throne by his son Anaxandridas II, who managed to defeat Tegea.

== Family tree ==
Leon of Sparta
King Anaxandridas II
Wife of Leon
King Cleomenes I of Sparta
Daughter of Prinetades
Gorgo, Queen of Sparta
Wife of Cleomenes
Pleistarchus
Wife of Eurycratides
Leon of Sparta
Eurycratides of Sparta
King Anaxandridas II of Sparta
Wife of Leon
Leonidas I, King of Sparta
Niece of Anaxandridas

== Notes ==
Preceded by Eurycratides	Agiad King of Sparta; 590 - 560 BC	Succeeded by Anaxandridas II
