= Poeaessa =

Poeaessa or Poiaessa (also spelled Poeaëssa and Poiaëssa; Ancient Greek: Ποιάεσσα) was a town of the borderlands between ancient Messenia and Laconia, mentioned by Strabo. Strabo relates that it was founded by Teleclus, king of Sparta, in the 8th century BCE, along with the cities of Echeiae and Tragium, and Poeaessa contained a sanctuary of Athena Nedusia.

Its site is unlocated, although it has been suggested that it was located, like the other cities founded by Teleclus, near the upper course of the Nedon River.
