= Agis I =

King of Sparta from c. 930 to c. 900 BC

King of Sparta
- Reign: c. 1057/6–1026/5 BC (mythical) or c. 930 – c. 900 BC (historical)
- Predecessor: Eurysthenes
- Successor: Echestratus
- Issue: Echestratus
- Father: Eurysthenes

Agis I (Greek: Ἄγις) was a king of Sparta and eponym of the Agiad dynasty. He was possibly the first historical king of Sparta, reigning at the end of the tenth century BC, during the emergence of the Dorians in Laconia. He is said by most ancient authors to have conquered the region and enslaved the helots.

== Life ==
Agis was the eponymous founder of the Agiad dynasty, one of the two royal families in Sparta (the other being the Eurypontids). The Greek historian Herodotus makes him the son of Lathria and Eurysthenes, who was the elder of the twin sons of Aristodemus—the first Heraclid king of Sparta as great-great-grandson of Herakles. However, Eurysthenes was certainly invented in order to extend the length of Spartan rule to the fall of the Mycenean civilisation—some time after 1200—while there was in fact a gap of more than two centuries before the arrival of the Dorians in Laconia. For the same reason, early Spartan kings were given a reign of 40 years on average, which in the case of Agis was from 1090 to 1050. In the list of kings compiled by Eusebius from Diodorus of Sicily, whose ultimate source was Apollodorus, Agis is listed as king for only one year, between 1027/6–1026/5. However, given the amount of deeds ascribed to him, the text should be emended to 31 years (therefore starting from 1057/6). Modern scholars have aimed to correct these rewritings and instead make Agis the real founder of the Agiad dynasty. The dates of his reign are also hypothetically corrected to c. 930–900, as they match the archaeological evidence of the Dorian settlement in Laconia.

Although Sparta is known for its diarchy, Agis ruled as sole king. Later the Eurypontids extended their ancestry to make them as old as the Agiads, but the diarchy was likely the result of the synoecism of Sparta, which took place in the 8th century, with Charilaus the first Eurypontid king (r. c.775–c.760). The Greek geographer Pausanias tells that Agis' co-king was Soos, but he was another invention, possibly dating from the 4th century, as Herodotus (writing in the 5th century) does not mention him.

The majority opinion among Greeks of the Archaic and Classical eras was that the first pair of kings, Eurysthenes and Procles (the first Eurypontid) conquered Laconia, but granted large autonomy to six territories outside Sparta, which were ruled by local kings. Agis nevertheless cancelled this policy and submitted Laconia to direct rule from Sparta. He notably conquered Amyclae, a city south of Sparta, and forced several non-Dorian groups to leave. As the inhabitants of Helos resisted, he enslaved them and therefore created the first helots, the famous slaves of Classical Sparta. This view is found in the writings of Pindar, Herodotus, Ephorus—the main source of the events, Plato and Isocrates. However, a diverging story is given by Pausanias, who ascribes the conquest of Laconia to the kings Archelaus and Charilaus, who reigned much later. Paul Cartledge favours the earlier date, because during the Classical era Laconian helots had forgotten their national identity, unlike their peers in Messenia—therefore indicating that Laconian helots had been enslaved for a much longer time. Mait Kõiv thinks instead that Pausanias' description of an 8th century conquest of Laconia by Sparta makes more sense historically and is better backed by archaeological evidence.

Herodotus writes that Agis was the father of Lycurgus, the mythical legislator of Sparta, as he is described as the uncle of Leobotas (Agis' grandson), whereas most other ancient sources place him in the Eurypontid family. Herodotus probably reproduced an attempt from the Agiads to appropriate Lycurgus' fame from the other dynasty.

== Bibliography ==
=== Ancient sources ===
- Eusebius, Chronicon.
- Herodotus, Histories.
- Pausanias, Description of Greece.

=== Modern sources ===
- David Asheri, Alan Lloyd, Aldo Corcella, A Commentary on Herodotus, Books 1–4, Oxford University Press, 2007. ISBN 978-0-19-814956-9
- W. den Boer, "Political Propaganda in Greek Chronology", Historia: Zeitschrift für Alte Geschichte, Bd. 5, H. 2 (Jun., 1956), pp. 162–177.
- Paul Cartledge, Sparta and Lakonia, A Regional History 1300–362 BC, London, Routledge, 2002 (originally published in 1979). ISBN 0-415-26276-3
- ——, Agesilaos and the Crisis of Sparta, Baltimore, Johns Hopkins University Press, 1987. ISBN 978-0-7156-3032-7
- Paul Christesen, Olympic Victor Lists and Ancient Greek History, Cambridge University Press, 2007. ISBN 978-0-521-86634-7
- W. G. Forrest, A History of Sparta, New York, Norton, 1969. SBN 393004813
- John Forsdyke, Greece before Homer, Ancient Chronology and Mythology, New York, Norton, 1957.
- Robin Hard, The Routledge Handbook of Greek Mythology: Based on H.J. Rose's "Handbook of Greek Mythology", London/New York, Routledge, 2004. ISBN 978-0-415-18636-0
- G. L. Huxley, Early Sparta, London, Faber & Faber, 1962. ISBN 0-389-02040-0
- ——, "Problems in the "Chronography" of Eusebius", Proceedings of the Royal Irish Academy: Archaeology, Culture, History, Literature, 1982, Vol. 82C, pp. 183–196.
- Mait Kõiv, Ancient Tradition and Early Greek History, The Origins of States in Early-Archaic Sparta, Argos and Corinth, Tallinn, Avita, 2003. ISBN 9985-2-0807-2
- D. W. Prakken, "Herodotus and the Spartan King Lists", Transactions and Proceedings of the American Philological Association, Vol. 71 (1940), pp. 460–472.

Regnal titles
Preceded by Eurysthenes	King of Sparta c. 930–c.900 BC	Succeeded by Echestratus
