= Tragium =

Ancient Greek town founded by Spartan King Teleclus

Tragium, or Tragion (Ancient Greek: Τράγιον), was a town of the borderlands between ancient Messenia and Laconia, mentioned by Strabo. Strabo relates that it was founded by Teleclus, king of Sparta, in the 8th century BCE, along with the cities of Echeiae and Poeaessa.

Its site is unlocated, although it has been suggested that it was located, like the other cities founded by Teleclus, near the upper course of the Nedon River.
