= Eurycratides =

King of Sparta

King of Sparta
- Reign: 615–590 BC
- Predecessor: Anaxander
- Successor: Leon of Sparta
- Issue: King Leon of Sparta
- Father: King Anaxander of Sparta
- Mother: Leandris

Eurycratides (Ancient Greek: Εὐρυκρατίδης, meaning "descendant of Eurycrates") was the thirteenth king of Sparta from the Agiad dynasty. He succeeded his father Anaxander around 615 BC and reigned during a devastating period of war with Tegea.

In 590 BC, Eurycratides was succeeded by his son Leon ("lion"). His grandson was King Anaxandridas II.

Preceded by Anaxander	Agiad King of Sparta; 615 – 590 BC	Succeeded by Leon
