= Alcmenes =

King of Sparta

King of Sparta
- Reign: c. 740 – 700 BC
- Predecessor: Teleclus
- Successor: Polydorus of Sparta

Alcmenes (Ancient Greek: Ἀλκμένης) or Alcamenes, Alkamenos, was the 9th king of Sparta of the Agiad dynasty, from c. 740 to c. 700 BC.

According to Pausanias, he was a commander in the night-expedition against Ampheia, which began the First Messenian War, but died before its 4th year. In his reign Helos was taken, a place near the mouth of the Eurotas, the last independent hold of the old Achaean population, and the supposed origin of the term "helot".

He succeeded his father Teleclus and was succeeded by his son Polydorus.

Preceded by Teleclus	Agiad King of Sparta c. 740 – c. 700 BC	Succeeded by Polydorus
