= Anaxander =

King of Sparta

- The first commander of second messenian war

King of Sparta
- Reign: 640 – 615 BC
- Predecessor: Eurycrates
- Successor: Eurycratides
- Issue: King Eurycratides of Sparta
- Father: King Eurycrates of Sparta
- Mother: Hesperis

Anaxander or Anaxandros (Ancient Greek: Ἀνάξανδρος) was the 12th Agiad King of Sparta (ruled c. 640–615 BC).

He was the son of King Eurycrates and father of King Eurycratides.

His grandson was King Leon of Sparta.

Anaxander is mentioned by famous persons, including Tyrtaeus (a poet) and Pausanias (geographer).

Preceded by Eurycrates	King of Sparta; 640 – 615 BC	Succeeded by Eurycratides
