= Phare (Laconia) =

Town of Laconia in the Spartan plain

Coordinates: 37°01′16″N 22°27′54″E

Phare (Ancient Greek: Φάρη) or Pharis (Φᾶρις), afterwards called Pharae (Φαραί), was a town of Laconia in the Spartan plain, situated upon the road from Amyclae to the sea. It was mentioned in the Catalog of ships in the Iliad, and was one of the ancient Achaean towns. It maintained its independence till the reign of Teleclus, king of Sparta; and, after its conquest, continued to be a Lacedaemonian town under the name of Pharae. It was said to have been plundered by Aristomenes in the Second Messenian War. It is also mentioned in a corrupt passage of Strabo, and by other ancient writers.

Pharis has been rightly placed at the deserted village of Vaphio, which lies south of the site of Amyclae, and contains an ancient "Treasury," like those of Mycenae and Orchomenus, which is in accordance with Pharis having been one of the old Achaean cities before the Dorian conquest. Its site was described by William Mure: "it is, like that of Mycenae, a tumulus, with an interior vault, entered by a door on one side, the access to which was pierced horizontally through the slope of the hill. Its situation, on the summit of a knoll, itself of rather conical form, while it increases the apparent size of the tumulus, adds much to its general loftiness and grandeur of effect. The roof of the vault, with the greater part of its material, is now gone, its shape being represented by a round cavity or crater on the summit of the tumulus. The doorway is still entire. It is 6 feet wide at its upper and narrower part. The stone lintel is 15 feet in length. The vault itself was probably between 30 and 40 feet in diameter." Mure adds: "Menelaus is said to have been buried at Amyclae. This may, therefore, have been the royal vault of the Spartan branch, as the Mycenaean monument was of the Argive branch of the Atridan family." But even if we suppose the monument to have been a sepulchre, and not a treasury, it stood at the distance of 4 or 5 miles (6 to 8 km) from Amyclae. In addition to this, Menelaus, according to other accounts, was buried at Therapne.
