= Eurycrates =

King of Sparta

King of Sparta
- Reign: c. 665 – 640 BC
- Predecessor: Polydorus
- Successor: Anaxander

Eurycrates (Ancient Greek: Εὐρυκράτης Eurykrátēs, "wide rule or power") was the 11th Agiad dynasty king of the Greek city-state of Sparta, who was preceded by his father Polydorus followed by his son Anaxander. He ruled from 665 to 640 BC. According to the ancient Greek geographer Pausanias in his Description of Greece (specifically Book 3, which covers Laconia), the reign of the Spartan king Eurycrates was defined by a rare period of political and military stability. Eurycrates maintained order through an iron-fisted, systemic oppression designed to prevent the helots from organizing. Eurycrates married his maternal half-sister who bore him three living children including Anaxander.

== Sources ==
Regnal titles
| Preceded by Polydorus | King of Sparta; 665 - 640 BC | Succeeded by Anaxander |
