= Polydorus of Sparta =

King of Sparta

King of Sparta
- Reign: c. 700 – c. 665 BC
- Predecessor: Alcmenes
- Successor: Eurycrates
- Consort: Panteleia

Polydorus (Polydoros) (Ancient Greek: Πολύδωρος; reigned from c. 700 to c. 665 BC) was the 10th Agiad dynasty king of Sparta. He succeeded his father Alcmenes and was succeeded by his son king Eurycrates.

Polydorus is known for supposedly supplementing the 'Great Rhetra' of Sparta. According to the Greek biographer Plutarch (writing roughly 700 years after the Spartan king), Polydorus and his co-king Theopompus changed the constitution of Sparta so that the Kings and the Gerousia (28 chosen men above the age of 60) could veto decisions made by the Spartan Apella (the male citizen body).

Pausanias, another Greek writing under Roman rule, gave a detailed account of the First Messenian War, a conflict between Sparta and their neighbors who would soon become their slaves. He tells us that Polydorus was in charge of the left side of the Spartan forces at Ampheia, and that his co-king Theopompus was in command of the right flank (more influential for Spartan offensive tactics).

Regnal titles
| Preceded by Alcamenes | Agiad King of Sparta c. 700 – c. 665 BC | Succeeded by Eurycrates |
