= Echestratus =

King of Sparta from c. 900 to c. 870 BC

King of Sparta
- Reign: c. 900 – 870 BC
- Predecessor: Agis I
- Successor: Labotas

Echestratus (Ancient Greek: Ἐχέστρατος, romanized: Ekhéstratos) was a King of ancient Sparta from about 900 to 870 BC. He was a son of king Agis I, and third of the Agiad line of Spartan kings.

In his reign Sparta gained control of the district of Cynuria on the Argive border. He was the father of Labotas or Leobotes, king of Sparta. His grandson was Doryssus.

== Notes ==
Preceded by Agis I	Agiad King of Sparta c. 900 - c. 870 BC	Succeeded by Labotas
