= Agesilaus I =

King of Sparta from c. 820 to 790 BC

King of Sparta
- Reign: c. 820 – 790 BC
- Predecessor: Doryssus
- Successor: Archelaus of Sparta

Agesilaus I (/əˌdʒɛsəˈleɪəs/; Ancient Greek: Ἀγησίλαος), son of Doryssus, was the 6th king of the Agiad line at Sparta, excluding Aristodemus. According to Apollodorus of Athens, he reigned forty-four years, and died in 886 BC. Pausanias makes his reign a short one, but contemporary with the legislation of Lycurgus. He was succeeded by his son Archelaus. His grandson was Teleclus.

Royal titles
Preceded by Doryssus	Agiad King of Sparta c. 820 - c. 790 BC	Succeeded by Archelaus
