= Timocreon =

5th-century BC Greek lyric poet

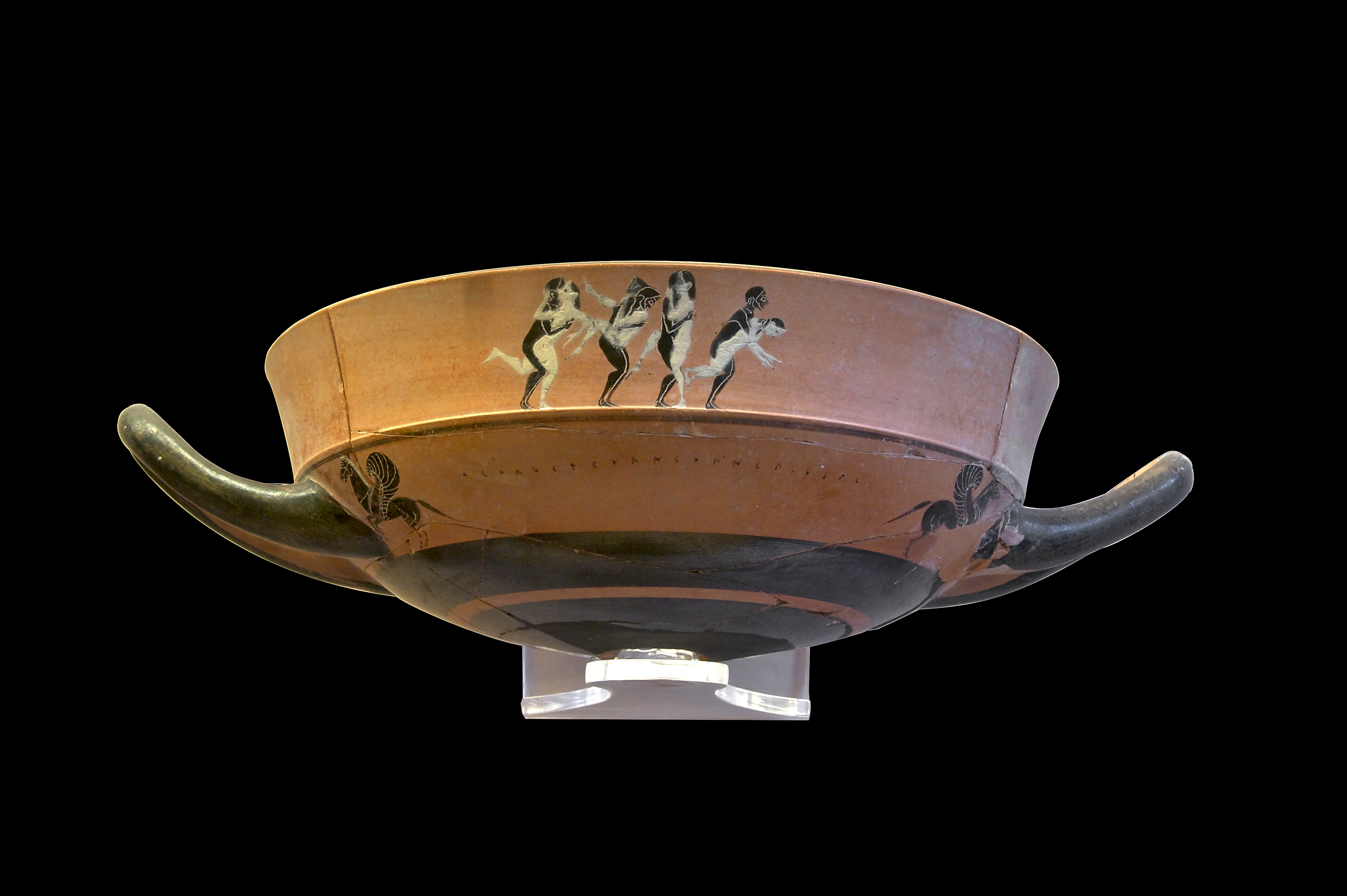
A lip cup from Ialysos, dated around 550–540 BC, showing couples in athletic poses. Timocreon, also from Ialysos, composed songs for drinking parties and was himself an athlete

Timocreon of Ialysus in Rhodes (Ancient Greek: Τιμοκρέων, gen.: Τιμοκρέοντος) was a Greek lyric poet who flourished about 480 BC, at the time of the Persian Wars. His poetry survives only in a very few fragments, and some claim he has received less attention from modern scholars than he deserves. He seems to have composed convivial verses for drinking parties. However, he is remembered particularly for his bitter clashes with Themistocles and Simonides over the issue of his medizing (siding with the Persian invaders), for which he had been banished from his home around the time of the Greek victory at the Battle of Salamis. He was also an athlete of some distinction and reputedly a glutton.

An epitaph for him, appearing in the Palatine Anthology, was credited to his rival, Simonides: "After much drinking, much eating and much slandering, I, Timocreon of Rhodes, rest here."

== Life and poetry ==
Plutarch is the main source of information about Timocreon's role as a medizer and enemy of Themistocles (Themistocles 21), while Herodotus supplies much of the background information (Histories 8.111-12). According to these accounts, Themistocles, the hero of the Battle of Salamis, gave up the pursuit of the retreating Persians to extort money from Greek island states in the Aegean, without the knowledge of his fellow commanders. It is possible that Timocreon was on Andros at this time and he paid Themistocles three talents of silver to restore him to his home town in Rhodes, from which he had been exiled for medizing. Themistocles took the money but reneged on the agreement and, even though bonds of hospitality between them required good faith, he accepted a bribe from someone else in a new deal that excluded Timocreon. Sailing away with the poet's money in his coffers but minus the poet himself, Themistocles soon arrived at the Corinthian Isthmus, where the Greek commanders met to decide who most deserved the prize for valour in their recent victory at Salamis. Themistocles hosted a banquet in an attempt to curry favour with his colleagues but won nothing by it since each of the commanders subsequently voted himself the most deserving of the prize (Histories 8.123-4). These events are commemorated by Timocreon in Fragment 727 (see below), composed in 480 BC or just a few years after the Battle of Salamis, though some scholars date it after Themistocles' fall from grace in Athens in 471 BC.

In an account recorded by Athenaeus, Timocreon ended up at the court of the Persian king where he distinguished himself as an athlete and glutton, eating so much that the king himself asked him what he was trying to do, to which Timocreon replied that he was getting ready to beat up countless Persians. He made good his promise the next day and, after overwhelming all the Persians who were game enough to fight him, he commenced punching the air, just to show that "he had all those blows left if anyone wanted to take him on." However, the boorishness and gluttony of athletes was a topos of Greek comedy and even a hero like Hercules was the butt of many jokes.

In some accounts, Themistocles also ended up visiting the Persian king, following his ostracism and spectacular fall from public favour in Athens. Rumours that he was medizing offered Timocreon a chance for revenge—see Fragment 728 and Fragment 729. Timocreon was also known as a composer of scolia (drinking-songs) and, according to the Suda, wrote plays in the style of Old Comedy. A famous drinking song of his was about the god Plutus, which seems to have inspired imitation by Aristophanes—see Fragment 731. Nothing however is known of his comedies and it is probable that he was not a dramatist but simply composed mocking lyrics. In an account by Philodemus (On Vices 10.4), he is presented as a conceited singer at a festival competition, where he performed a song about Castor. Diogenian mentions two proverbs that Timocreon employed in his verses. One was a Cyprian fable about doves escaping from a sacrificial fire only to fall into another fire later on (demonstrating that wrong-doers eventually get their just deserts), and the other was a Carian fable about a fisherman who espies an octopus in the winter sea and wonders whether or not to dive after it, since this is a choice between his children starving or himself freezing to death (i.e. you're damned if you do and damned if you don't). The latter proverb was also used by Simonides, whose rivalry with Timocreon seems to have inspired the abusive 'epitaph' quoted earlier and the epigrammatic reply from the Rhodian poet in A.P. 13.31.

=== Fragment 727 PMG ===
This is the largest extant poem attributed to Timocreon. It was quoted by Plutarch in a biography of Themistocles, as were the following two fragments, 728 and 729 (see Life above for historical context). It begins like a hymn of praise or encomium for the Athenian hero, Aristides, but soon turns into a denunciation of Themistocles.

ἀλλ᾽ εἰ τύ γε Παυσανίαν ἢ καὶ τύ γε Ξάνθιππον αἰνεῖς
ἢ τύ γε Λευτυχίδαν, ἐγὼ δ᾽ Ἀριστείδαν ἐπαινέω
ἄνδρ᾽ ἱερᾶν ἀπ᾽ Ἀθανᾶν
ἐλθεῖν ἕνα λῷστον: ἐπεὶ Θεμιστοκλῆ ἤχθαρε Λατώ,

ψεύσταν, ἄδικον, προδόταν, ὃς Τιμοκρέοντα ξεῖνον ἐόντα
ἀργυρίοισι κοβαλικοῖσι πεισθεὶς οὐ κατᾶγεν
πάτρίδ᾽ Ἰαλυσόν εἰσω,
λαβὼν δὲ τρί᾽ ἀργυρίου τάλαντ᾽ ἔβα πλέων εἰς ὄλεθρον,

τοὺς μὲν κατάγων ἀδίκως, τοὺς δ᾽ ἐκδιώκων, τοὺς δὲ καίνων·
ἀργυρίων ὑπόπλεως, Ἰσθμοῖ γελοίως πανδόκευε
ψυχρὰ τὰ κρεῖα παρίσχων·
οἱ δ᾽ ἤσθιον κηὔχοντο μὴ ὥραν Θεμιστοκλεῦς γενέσθαι.

Well now, if you praise Pausanias and you, sir, Xanthippus,
and you Leotychides, I commend Aristides
as the very best man to have come
from holy Athens, for Themistocles was hated by Leto

as a liar, a criminal, a traitor, bribed with baneful silver
not to take Timocreon home to his native Ialysus
though he was his guest and friend,
but instead took his three talents of silver and sailed to perdition,

restoring some to their homes unjustly, chasing out others, killing some.
Gorged with silver, he made an absurd Isthmian innkeeper,
serving cold meat: the guests
ate up and prayed that Themistocles would go unnoticed.

The poem is generally more valued by historians than by literary critics—it has been thought to lack elegance and wit, and it strangely includes elements of choral lyric though it is not a choral song but a solo performance. The choral elements are dactylo-epitrite meter and what seems to be triadic structure (i.e. strophe, antistrophe, epode) (Note: David Campbell (Greek Lyric Poetry, Bristol Classical Press (1982), page 101-2) organises the verses to scan as follows: --uu-uu---u---u-x -uu-uu-x-u---u-- -uu-uu-- x-uu-uu-u-u---u-- Line 12 in the 'epode' scans differently: --u---u---u-u-u-- For a slightly different version see for example Bernadotte Perrin's 1914 edition of Plutarch's Themistocles, chapter 21 at Perseus digital library) C.M. Bowra considered it "a strange and uncomfortable poem". Another scholar saw parallels between it and Anacreon's Artemon but judged Anacreon's poem to have more grace and wit. However, scholarly analysis of the poem has not produced agreement or convincing results and much depends on how we interpret the poet's tone. The reference to Leto is obscure but she may have had some connection with Salamis or perhaps there was a temple to her at Corinth.

=== Fragment 728 ===
Μοῦσα τοῦδε τοῦ μέλεος
κλέος ἀν᾽ Ἕλλανας τίθει,
ὡς ἐοικὸς καὶ δίκαιον.

Muse, spread the fame of this song
among the Hellenes,
as is fitting and just.

These lines introduced one of Timocreon's most bitter denunciations of Themistocles, according to Plutarch.

=== Fragment 729 ===
οὐκ ἄρα Τιμοκρέων μόνος
Μήδοισιν ὁρκιατομεῖ,
ἀλλ᾽ ἐντὶ κἆλλοι δὴ πονη-
ροί κοὐκ ἐγὼ μόνα κόλου-
ρις· ἐντὶ κἄλλαι ᾽λώπεκες.

Timocreon then is not the only one
who swears a solemn oath with the Medes:
there are other scoundrels too.
And I'm not the only one with a docked tail:
there are other foxes too.

The reference to a docked tail is usually understood to indicate some mishap the poet suffered. Plutarch identified Themistocles as one of the other 'scoundrels' referred to in the poem.

=== Fragment 731 ===
ώφελέν σ᾽ ὦ τυφλὲ Πλοῦτε
μήτε γᾖ μήτ᾽ ἐν θαλάσσῃ
μήτ᾽ ἐν ἠπείρῳ φανῆμεν
ἀλλὰ Τάρταρόν τε ναίειν
κ᾽Αχέροντα· διὰ σὲ γὰρ πάντ᾽
αἰὲν ἀνθρώποις κακά.

Blind Wealth, if only you had appeared
neither on land nor on sea
nor on the continent,
but had lived in Tartarus
and Acheron; for thanks to you
men always have all evils.

These verses were recorded by a scholiast in a commentary on a play of Aristophanes. Apparently the verses were imitated by Aristophanes in Acharnians (lines 532-6). (Note: Aristophanes' verses: ἐντεῦθεν ὀργῇ Περικλέης οὑλύμπιος ἤστραπτ᾽ ἐβρόντα ξυνεκύκα τὴν Ἑλλάδα, ἐτίθει νόμους ὥσπερ σκόλια γεγραμμένους, ὡς χρὴ Μεγαρέας μήτε γῇ μήτ᾽ ἐν ἀγορᾷ μήτ᾽ ἐν θαλάττῃ μήτ᾽ ἐν οὐρανῷ μένειν. Translation: "Because Pericles, Olympian Pericles, sent out thunder and lightning and threw all Greece into confusion. He began making laws written like drinking songs, No Megarian shall stand On sea or on land And from all of our markets they're utterly banned." Translation by A. H. Sommerstein, Aristophanes: Lysistrata, The Acharnians, The Clouds, Penguin Classics (1973), page 72)

=== A.P. 13.31 ===
Κηία με προσῆλθε φλυαρία οὐκ ἐθέλοντα·
οὐ θέλοντα με προσῆλθε Κηία φλυαρία.

Nonsense from Ceos came to me against my will.
Against my will there came to me nonsense from Ceos.

The couplet is listed among the "metrical curiosities" of the Palatine Anthology (its form is a hexameter followed by a trochaic tetrameter) and it might be Timocreon's reply to Simonides' 'epitaph', as translated in the introduction of this article. Simonides was from Ceos.

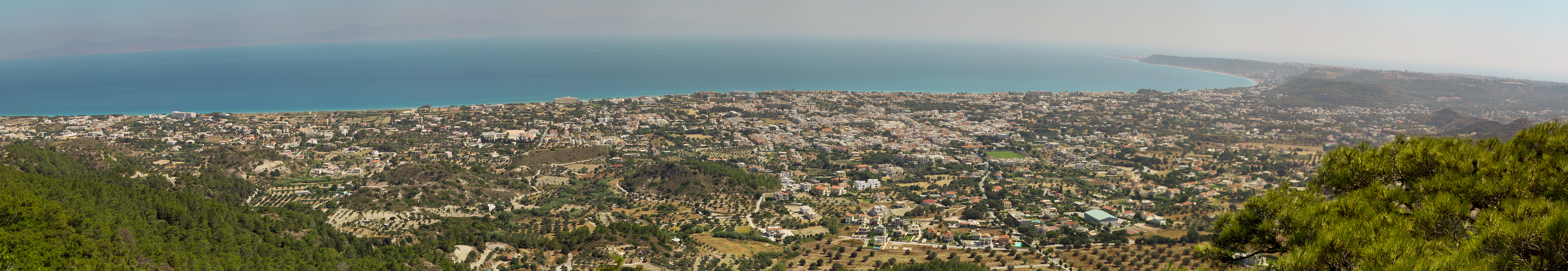
Modern view over Ialysos, the scandalous poet's home town.
