= Cleombrotus (regent) =

Regent of Sparta between 480 and 479 BC

Regent of Sparta
- Reign: 480–479 BC
- Predecessor: Leonidas I
- Successor: Pausanias
- Died: 479 BC; Sparta
- Issue: Pausanias; Nikomedes
- Greek: Κλεόμβροτος
- House: Agiad
- Father: Anaxandridas II

Cleombrotus (Greek: Κλεόμβροτος, Kleómbrotos), regent of Sparta between 480 and 479 BC. He was a member of the Agiad dynasty, the son of Anaxandridas II and the brother of Cleomenes I, Dorieus and of Leonidas I. When the latter died, he became the tutor of his nephew Pleistarchus, son of Leonidas, and leader of the Greek infantry at the beginning of the second phase of the Greco-Persian Wars. Cleombrotus was in command of the Spartan and Peloponnesian troops who built the wall across the Isthmus of Corinth that was intended to keep the Persian army out of the Peloponnese. He died soon after returning to Sparta from the Isthmus.

He was the father of Pausanias and the Spartan general Nicomedes.

== Notes ==
Regnal titles
Preceded by Leonidas I	Agiad Regent of Sparta; 480–479 BC	Succeeded by Pausanias
