= Leonidas I =

King of Sparta from c. 489 BC to 480 BC

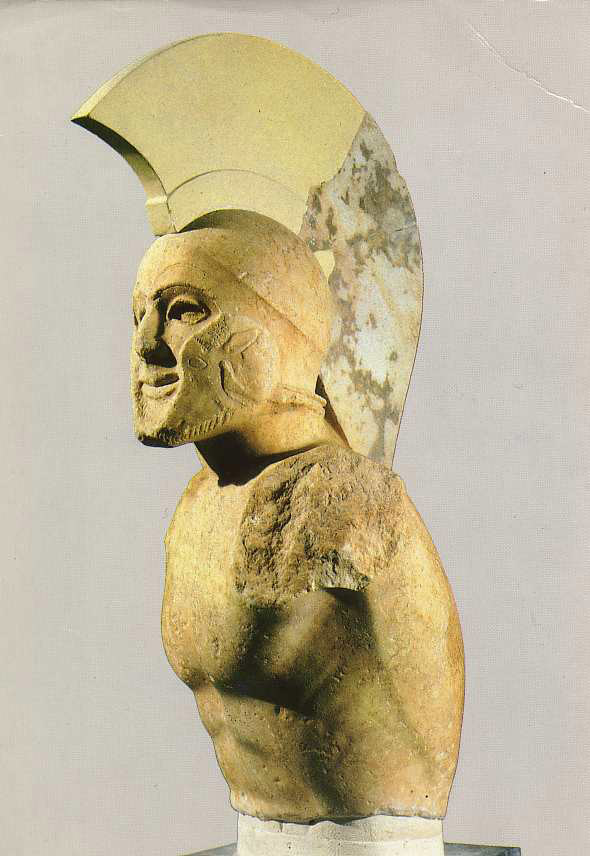
- Sculpture of a hoplite, called "Leonidas" by its excavators. 5th century BC

King of Sparta
- Reign: 489–480 BC
- Predecessor: Cleomenes I
- Successor: Pleistarchus
- Co-ruler: Leotychidas II
- Born: c. 540 BC; Sparta, Greece
- Died: 11 August 480 BC (59–60); Thermopylae, Greece
- Consort: Gorgo
- Issue: Pleistarchus
- Greek: Λεωνίδᾱς
- House: Agiad
- Father: Anaxandridas II
- Religion: Greek polytheism
- Military career
- Allegiance: Sparta
- Branch: Spartan army
- Conflicts: Second Persian invasion of Greece; Battle of Thermopylae †

Leonidas I (/liəˈnaɪdəs, -dæs/; Ancient Greek: Λεωνίδας, Leōnídas; c. 540 BC - 11 August 480 BC) was Greek king of the Ancient Greek city-state of Sparta. He was the son of king Anaxandridas II and the 17th king of the Agiad dynasty, a Spartan royal house which claimed descent from Heracles. Leonidas I ascended to the throne in c. 489 BC, succeeding his half-brother king Cleomenes I. He ruled jointly along with king Leotychidas II until his death in 480 BC, when he was succeeded by his son, Pleistarchus.

At the Second Greco-Persian War, Leonidas led the allied Greek forces in a last stand at the Battle of Thermopylae (480 BC), attempting to defend the pass from the invading Persian army, and was killed early during the third and last day of the battle. Leonidas entered myth as a hero and the leader of the 300 Spartans who died in battle at Thermopylae. Although the Greeks lost this battle, they were able to expel the Persian invaders the following year (479 BC), in the Battle of Plataea.

== Life ==
According to Herodotus, Leonidas's mother was not only his father's wife, but also his father's niece and had been barren for so long that the ephors, the five annually elected administrators of the Spartan constitution, tried to prevail upon King Anaxandridas II to set her aside and take another wife. Anaxandridas refused, claiming his wife was blameless, whereupon the ephors agreed to allow him to take a second wife without setting aside his first. This second wife, a descendant of Chilon of Sparta (one of the Seven Sages of Greece), promptly bore a son, Cleomenes. However, one year after Cleomenes's birth, Anaxandridas's first wife also gave birth to a son, Dorieus. Leonidas was the second son of Anaxandridas's first wife, and either the elder brother or twin of Cleombrotus. Leonidas's name means "descendant of Leon", and he was named after his grandfather Leon of Sparta. The Doric Greek suffix -ίδας, with corresponding Attic form -ίδης, mainly means "descendant of". But literally his name can also mean "son of a lion", as the name Leon means "lion" in Greek.

King Anaxandridas II died in c. 524 BC, and Cleomenes succeeded to the throne in sometime between then and 516 BC. Dorieus was so outraged that the Spartans had preferred his half-brother over himself that he found it impossible to remain in Sparta. He made one unsuccessful attempt to set up a colony in Africa and, when this failed, sought his fortune in Sicily, where after initial successes he was killed. Leonidas's relationship with his bitterly antagonistic elder brothers is unknown, but he married Cleomenes's daughter, Gorgo, sometime before coming to the throne in 490 BC.

Leonidas was heir to the Agiad throne (successor of Cleomenes I) and a full citizen (homoios) at the time of the Battle of Sepeia against Argos (c. 494 BC). Likewise, he was a full citizen when the Persians sought submission from Sparta and met with vehement rejection in 492/491 BC. His elder half-brother, King Cleomenes, had already been deposed on grounds of purported insanity, and had fled into exile when Athens sought assistance against the First Persian invasion of Greece, that ended at Marathon (490 BC).

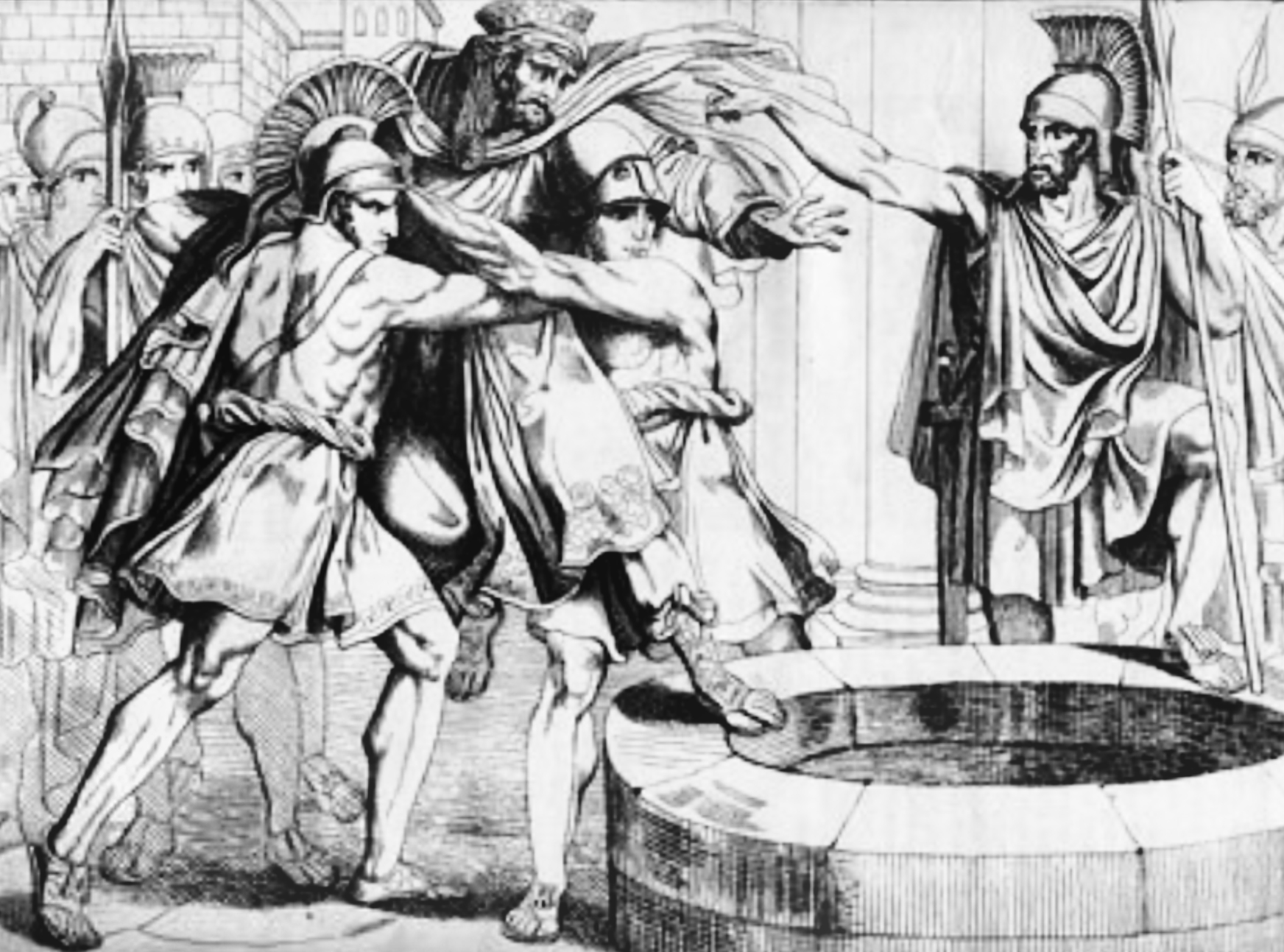
The Spartans throw Persian envoys into a well.

Plutarch wrote, “When someone said to him: 'Except for being king you are not at all superior to us,' Leonidas son of Anaxandridas and brother of Cleomenes replied: 'But were I not better than you, I should not be king.'" The product of the agoge, Leonidas was unlikely to have been referring to his royal blood alone but rather suggesting that, like his brother Dorieus, he had proved himself superior in the competitive environment of Spartan training and society, thus making him qualified to rule.

Leonidas was chosen to lead the combined Greek forces determined to resist the Second Persian invasion of Greece in 481 BC. This was not simply a tribute to Sparta's military prowess: The probability that the coalition wanted Leonidas personally for his capability as a military leader is underlined by the fact that just two years after his death, the coalition preferred Athenian leadership to the leadership of either Leotychidas or Leonidas's successor (as regent for his still under-aged son) Pausanias. The rejection of Leotychidas and Pausanias was not a reflection on Spartan arms. Sparta's military reputation had never stood in higher regard, nor was Sparta less powerful in 478 BC than it had been in 481 BC.

This selection of Leonidas to lead the defence of Greece against Xerxes's invasion led to Leonidas's death in the Battle of Thermopylae in 480 BC.

=== Battle of Thermopylae ===
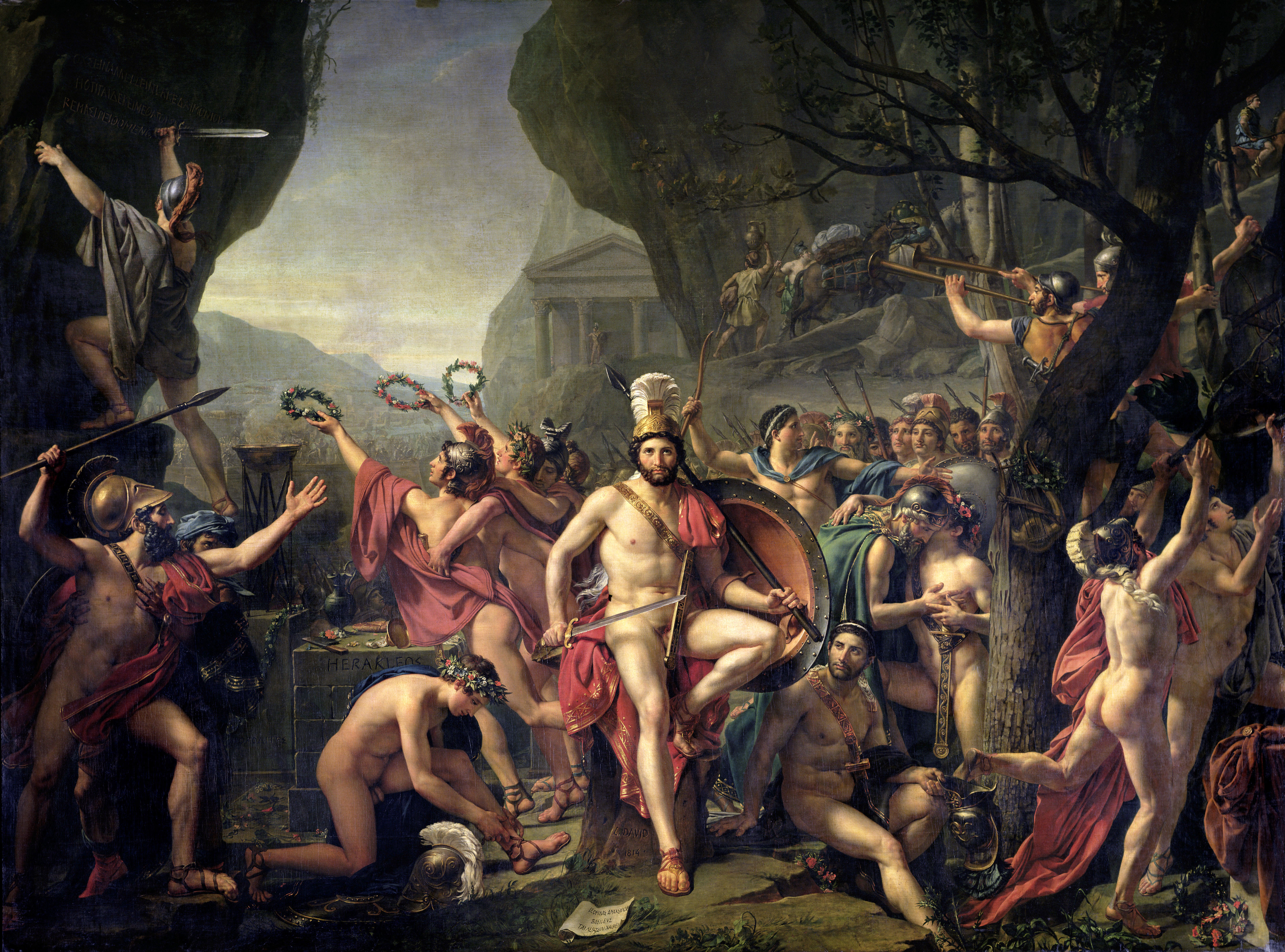
Leonidas at Thermopylae (1814) by Jacques-Louis David, who chose the subject in the aftermath of the French Revolution as a model of "civic duty and self-sacrifice", but also as a contemplation of loss and death, with Leonidas quietly poised and heroically nude

Upon receiving a request from the confederated Greek forces to aid in defending Greece against the Persian invasion, Sparta consulted the Oracle at Delphi. The Oracle is said to have made the following prophecy in hexameter verse:

For you, inhabitants of wide-wayed Sparta,
Either your great and glorious city must be wasted by Persian men,
Or if not that, then the bound of Lacedaemon must mourn a dead king, from Heracles' line.
The might of bulls or lions will not restrain him with opposing strength; for he has the might of Zeus.
I declare that he will not be restrained until he utterly tears apart one of these.

In August 480 BC, Leonidas marched out of Sparta to meet Xerxes's army at Thermopylae with a small force of 1,200 men (900 helots and 300 Spartan hoplites), where he was joined by forces from other Greek city-states, who put themselves under his command to form an army of 7,000 strong. There are various theories on why Leonidas was accompanied by such a small force of hoplites. According to Herodotus, "the Spartans sent the men with Leonidas on ahead so that the rest of the allies would see them and march with no fear of defeat, instead of siding with the Persians like the others if they learned that the Spartans were delaying. After completing their festival, the Carneia, they left their garrison at Sparta and marched in full force towards Thermopylae. The rest of the allies planned to do likewise, for the Olympiad coincided with these events. They accordingly sent their advance guard, not expecting the war at Thermopylae to be decided so quickly." Many modern commentators are dissatisfied with this explanation and point to the fact that the Olympic Games were in progress or to impute internal dissent and intrigue.

Whatever the reason Sparta's own contribution was just 300 Spartiates (accompanied by their attendants and probably perioikoi auxiliaries), the total force assembled for the defence of the pass of Thermopylae came to something between four and seven thousand Greeks. They faced a Persian army who had invaded from the north of Greece under Xerxes I. Herodotus stated that this army consisted of over two million men; modern scholars consider this to be an exaggeration and give estimates ranging from 70,000 to 300,000.

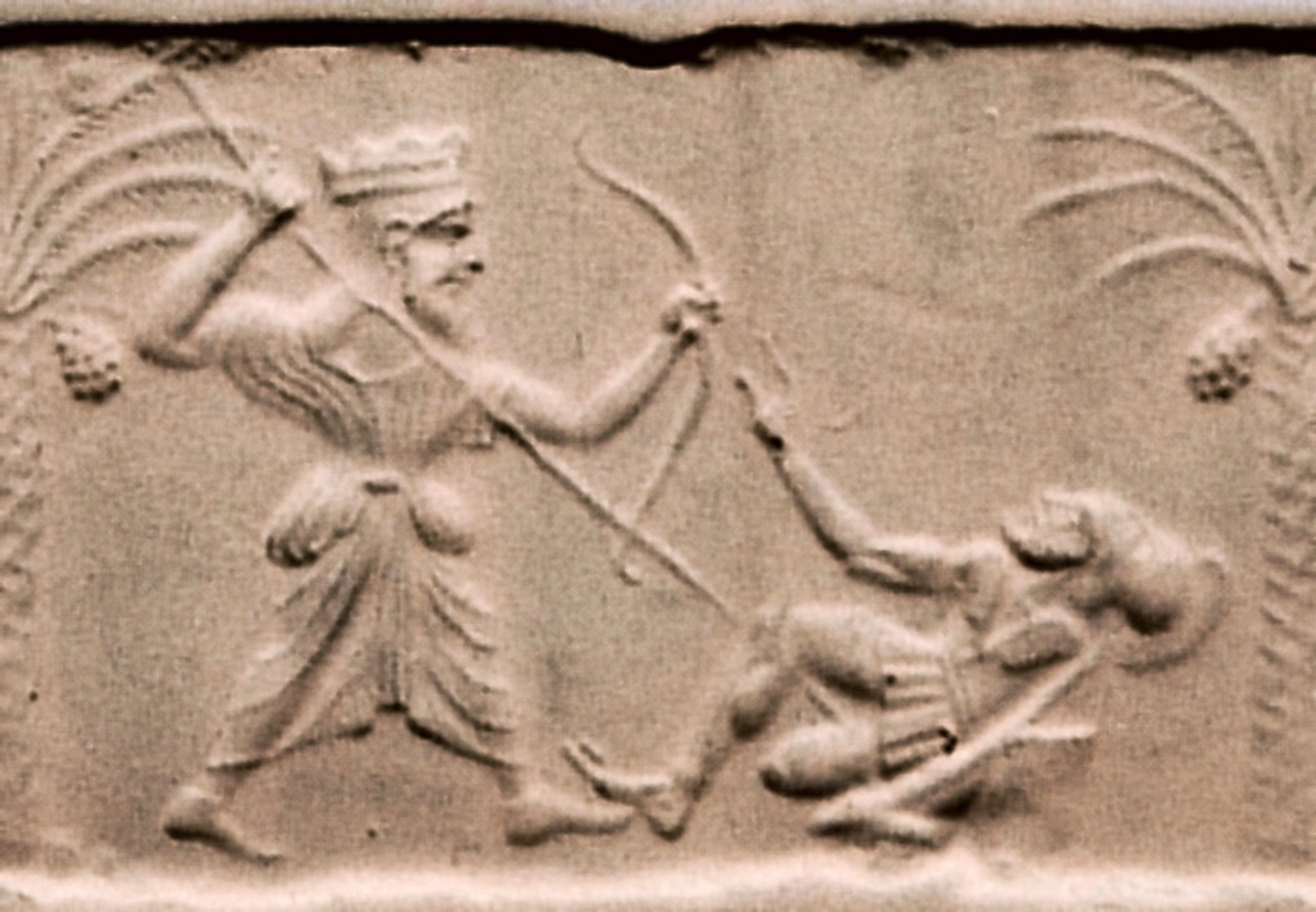
Achaemenid king killing a Greek hoplite. Circa 500 BC–475 BC, at the time of Xerxes I. Metropolitan Museum of Art.

Xerxes waited four days to attack, hoping the Greeks would disperse. Finally, on the fifth day the Persians attacked. Leonidas and the Greeks repulsed the Persians' frontal attacks during the fifth and sixth days, killing roughly 10,000 of the enemy troops. The Persian elite unit known to the Greeks as "the Immortals" was held back, and two of Xerxes's brothers (Abrocomes and Hyperanthes) died in battle. On the seventh day (11 August), a Malian Greek traitor named Ephialtes led the Persian general Hydarnes by a mountain track to the rear of the Greeks. At that point Leonidas sent away most of the Greek troops and remained in the pass with his 300 Spartans, 900 helots, 400 Thebans and 700 Thespians. The Thespians stayed entirely of their own will, declaring that they would not abandon Leonidas and his followers. Their leader was Demophilus, son of Diadromes, and as Herodotus writes, "Hence they lived with the Spartans and died with them."

One theory provided by Herodotus is that Leonidas sent away the remainder of his men because he cared about their safety. The King would have thought it wise to preserve those Greek troops for future battles against the Persians, but he knew that the Spartans could never abandon their post on the battlefield. The soldiers who stayed behind were to protect their escape against the Persian cavalry. Herodotus believed that Leonidas gave the order because he perceived the allies to be disheartened and unwilling to encounter the danger to which his own mind was made up. He therefore chose to dismiss all the troops except the Thebans, Thespians and helots and save the glory for the Spartans.

Of the small Greek force, which was attacked from both sides, all were killed except for the 400 Thebans, who surrendered to Xerxes without a fight. When Leonidas was killed, the Spartans retrieved his body after driving back the Persians four times. Herodotus says that Xerxes's orders were to have Leonidas's head cut off and put on a stake and his body crucified. This was considered offensive and sacrilegious by many.

== Legacy ==
A hero cult of Leonidas survived in Sparta until the Antonine era (2nd century AD). Leonideia (λεωνιδεῖα) were solemnities celebrated every year in Sparta in honour of Leonidas and only Spartans were allowed to take part. The contest was held opposite the theatre at Sparta where there were the two sepulchral monuments of Pausanias and Leonidas.

=== Modern culture ===
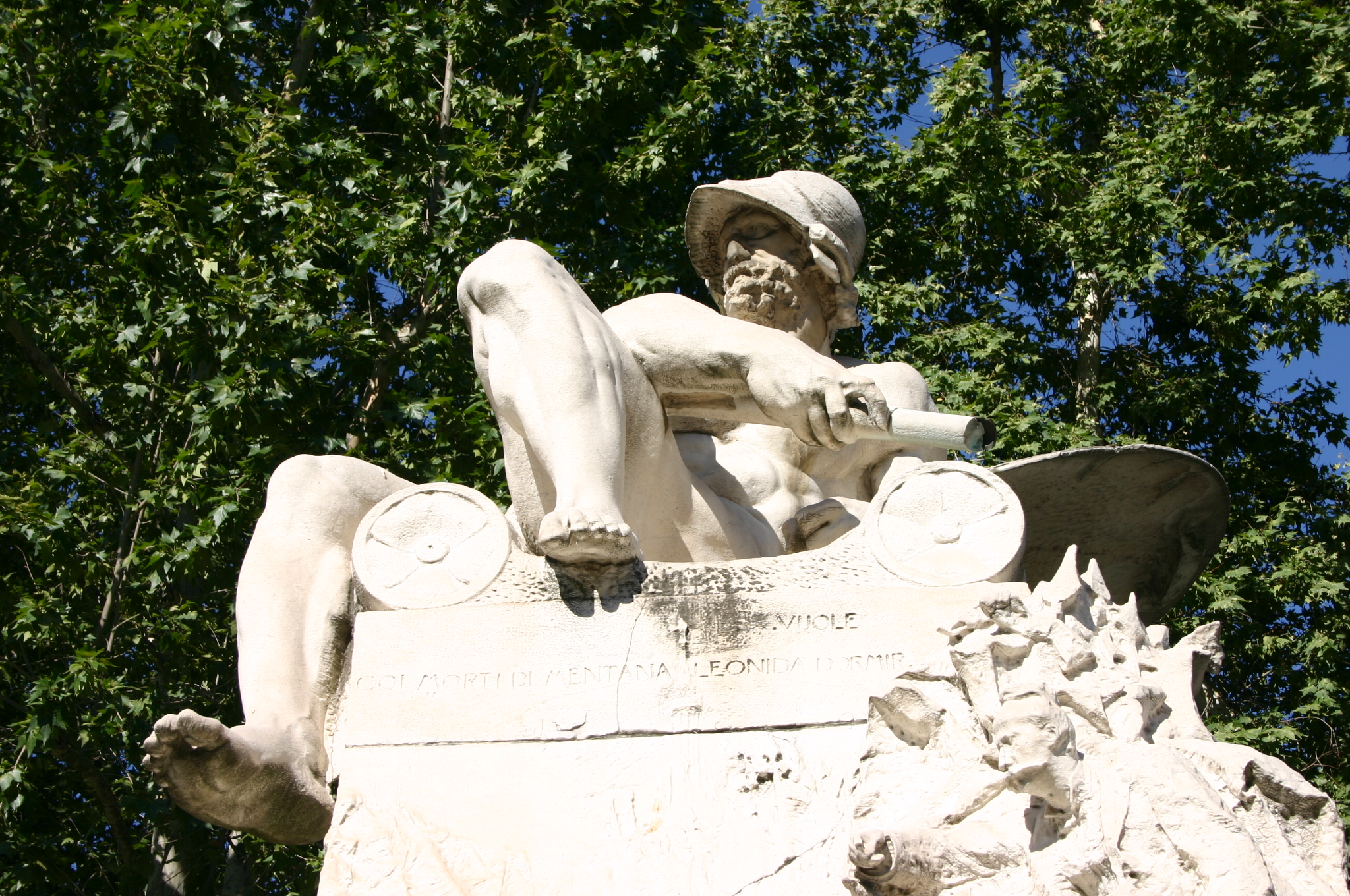
Statues of Leonidas at Thermopylae (top left), in Sparta (top right), and depicted on top of the monument to Felice Cavallotti in Milan, created by Ernesto Bazzaro in 1906.

A bronze statue of Leonidas was erected at Thermopylae in 1955. A sign under the statue reads simply: "ΜΟΛΩΝ ΛΑΒΕ" ("Come and take them"), which was Leonidas's laconic reply when Xerxes offered to spare the lives of the Spartans if they gave up their arms. Another statue, also with the inscription ΜΟΛΩΝ ΛΑΒΕ, was erected in Sparta in 1969.

Another monument to Leonidas was erected in Brunswick, a suburb of Melbourne, Australia, in November 2009. Brunswick is known as "the suburb of the Spartans" due to an influx of migrants from the Laconian region of Greece during the 1950s and 1960s.

Leonidas was the name of an epic poem written by Richard Glover, which originally appeared in 1737. It went on to appear in four other editions, being expanded from 9 books to 12. He is a central figure in Steven Pressfield's novel Gates of Fire, and appears as the protagonist of Frank Miller's 1998 comic book series 300. It presents a fictionalised version of Leonidas and the Battle of Thermopylae, as does the 2006 feature film adapted from it.

In cinema, Leonidas has been portrayed by Richard Egan in the 1962 epic The 300 Spartans, by Gerard Butler in the 2006 film 300, inspired by the graphic novel of the same name by Frank Miller and Lynn Varley (Tyler Neitzel portrayed Leonidas as a young man), and by Sean Maguire in the 2008 film Meet the Spartans, a parody of the 2006 film.

Leonidas was later adapted into the anime and manga, Record of Ragnarok (Japanese: 終末のワルキューレ, Shūmatsu no Warukyūre) by Shinya Umemura and Takumi Fukui, in which he is depicted as a fighter for humanity.

Leonidas appears prominently in the opening prologue of the 2018 video game Assassin's Creed Odyssey, titled "Battle of Thermopylae".

== Notes ==
Preceded by Cleomenes I	Agiad King of Sparta; 489–480 BC	Succeeded by Pleistarchus
