= Labotas =

King of Sparta from c. 870 to c. 840 BC

King of Sparta
- Reign: c. 870–c. 840 BC
- Predecessor: Echestratus
- Successor: Doryssus

Labotas, also spelled Leobotas or Leobotes (Ancient Greek: Λαβώτας or Λεωβώτης, romanized: Labṓtas or Leōbṓtēs) was the son of Echestratus and was the third king of Sparta from the Agiad dynasty.

Labotas led a war against the Argives because the Kynouria occupied and supposedly lived in the surrounding areas that the Perioeci had inhabited.

According to Jerome and the Excerpta Latina Barbari he reigned 37 years. After his death, his son Doryssos inherited the throne.

Preceded by Echestratus	Agiad King of Sparta c. 870 - c. 840 BC	Succeeded by Doryssus
