= Leonidas at Thermopylae =

Painting by Jacques-Louis David

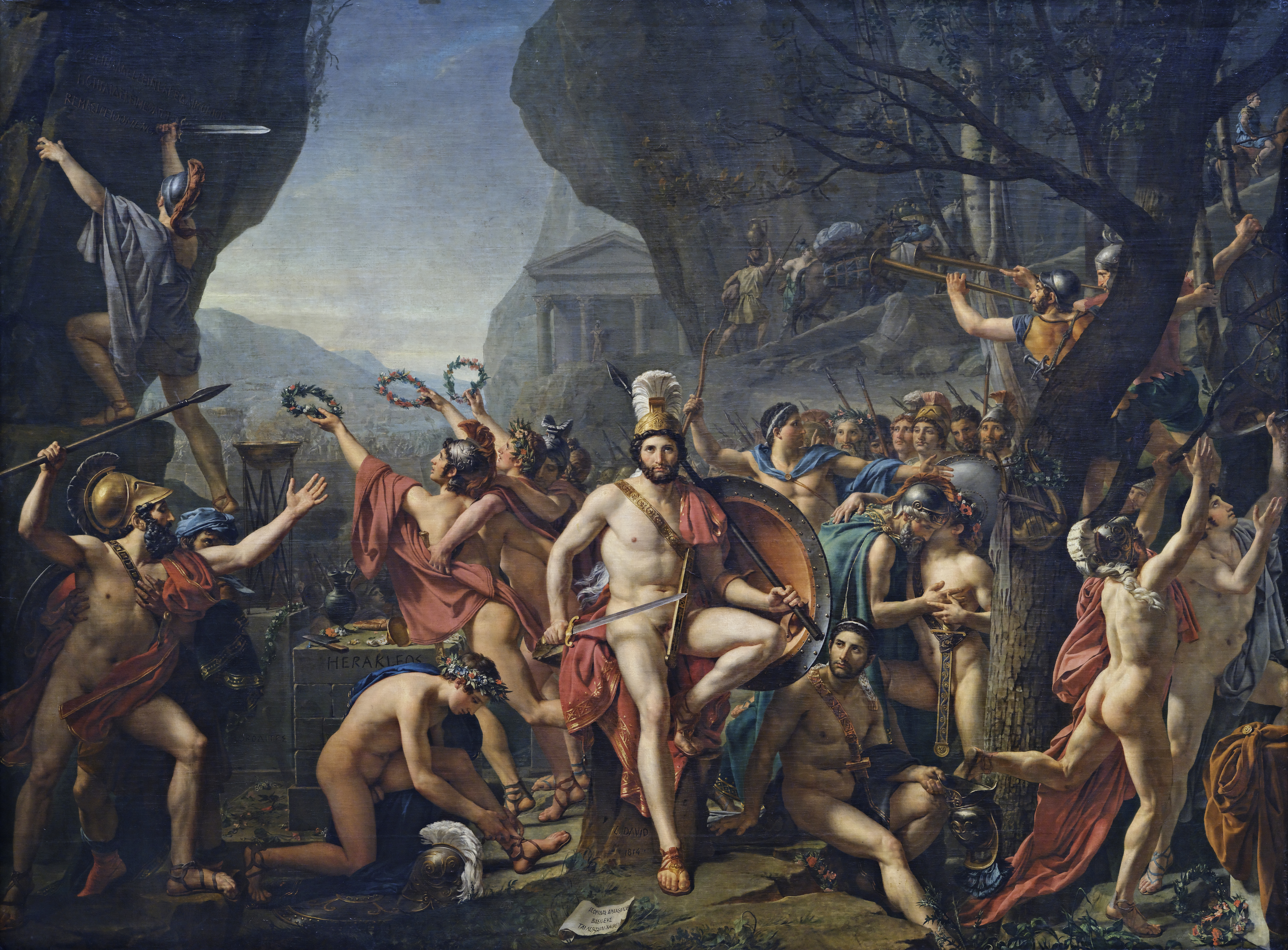
- Artist: Jacques-Louis David
- Year: 1814
- Medium: oil on canvas
- Dimensions: 395 cm × 531 cm (12.96 ft × 17.42 ft)
- Location: Louvre, Paris

Leonidas at Thermopylae is an oil-on-canvas painting by French artist Jacques-Louis David. The work currently hangs in the Louvre in Paris, France. David completed the massive work (3.95 m × 5.31 m) 15 years after he began, working on it from 1799 to 1803 and again in 1813–1814. Leonidas at Thermopylae was purchased, along with The Intervention of the Sabine Women, in November 1819 for 100,000 francs by Louis XVIII, the king of France. The piece depicts the Spartan king Leonidas prior to the Battle of Thermopylae. David's pupil Georges Rouget collaborated on it.

== Background ==
The crowded and theatrical scene that David depicts takes place in a time of war, seemingly in Ancient Greece from the Greek temple and temperate mountains in the background. The setting is the mountain pass in which the Battle of Thermopylae was about to be fought, in 480 BCE. Thermopylae was chosen as an ideal location for waging a defensive action in view of its narrow passage through the mountainous geography. This helped the Greeks make a better stand against the numerically vastly superior Persians, who were invading Greece. King Leonidas, the Spartan leader, "delayed the invasion of Xerxes and the Persians…by sacrificing himself and his men to give the Greeks the time they needed to organize an ultimately victorious resistance" in the long run. This act of bravery and sacrifice by King Leonidas and his three hundred soldiers inspired David as France waged its own campaigns against rival European powers that wanted to restore France's pre-revolutionary ancien régime. In 1813–14, when he finished the painting, European powers allied against the First French Empire were invading France to topple the emperor, Napoleon Bonaparte, and David again found inspiration in the story of Leonidas at the Battle of Thermopylae.

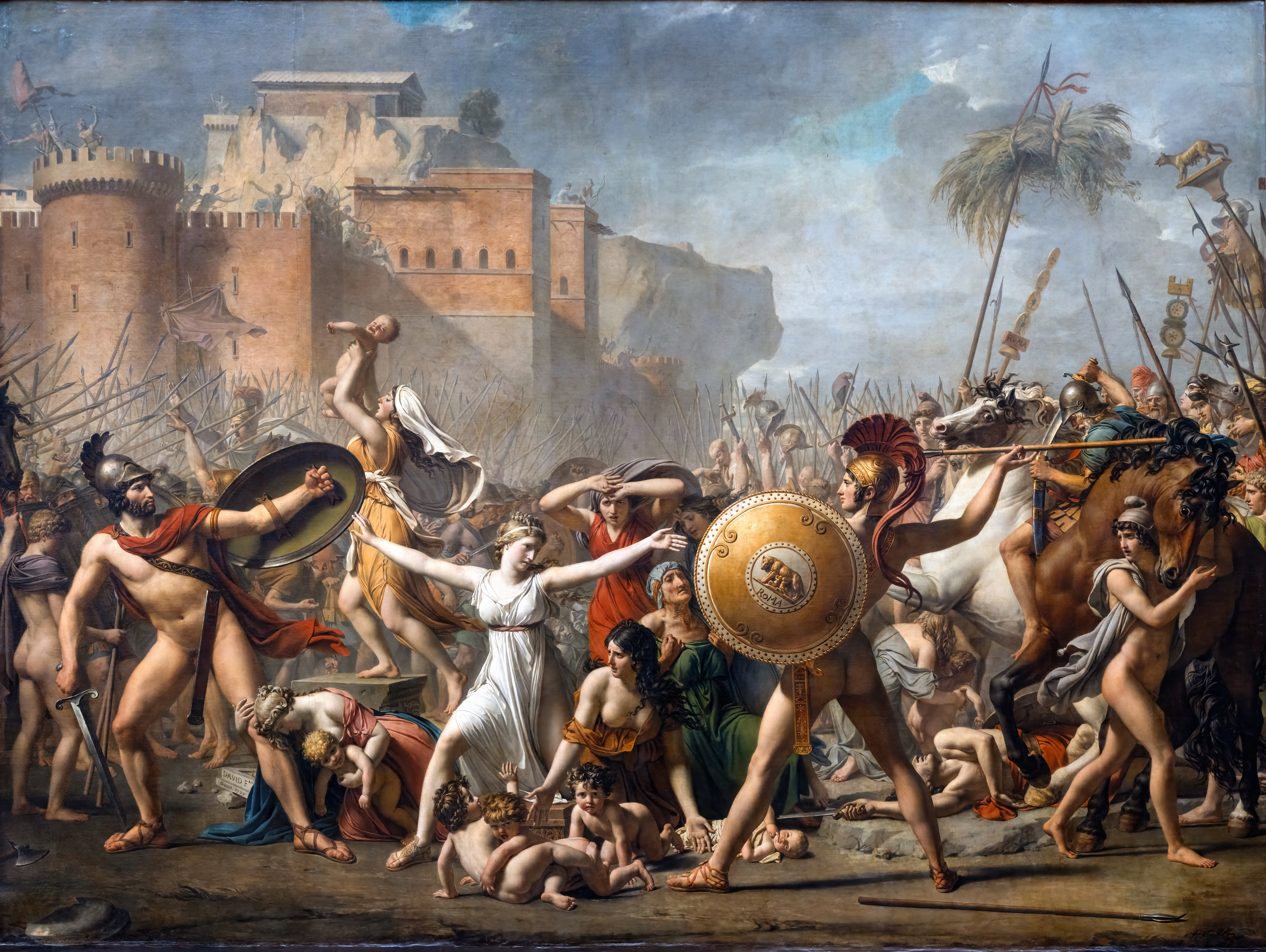
David's The Intervention of the Sabine Women (1799), Louvre, Paris.

== Style ==
When Napoleon Bonaparte saw the exhibit of David's latest paintings in 1799, "he criticized the lack of action and the fixed poses of the warriors in The Sabine Women." This critique by one of David's heroes compelled David to revisit the classical ideals that inspired him (and the French Académie de Peinture et de Sculpture). The reworked masterpiece respects classical ideals of male virtue and beauty in its depiction of historical Greek warriors to convey an impression of heroic courage.

== Earlier sketches ==
David made many sketches before the final oil on canvas composition was executed. A sketch dating back to 1814 is a compositional study that was completed in two separate parts, leaving the final result somewhat choppy and overworked. There are a few differences between this compositional study and the final painting, one of which being a more full view of the background which resulted from the removal of trees and branches from the earlier sketch. Classical male figures were included from the beginning of David's sketches for Leonidas at Thermopylae.

== Composition ==
In Leonidas at Thermopylae, it is implied that the war is deeper than just the main figures in the foreground, with hundreds of other warriors in the battle too. In the foreground, we see that chaos has broken out and the army seems to be in shambles, while the leader of the army remains calm as the war progresses around him. The emphasized man in the center, presumably Leonidas, instantly draws the viewers’ eyes to him. Not only is Leonidas more bathed in light out of any of the partly shadowed figures in the painting, he also has the most static pose while almost everyone else is in motion. In this brief snapshot of a glimpse into an intense battle, he takes a moment to reflect on the war. While he is the leader of his army, Leonidas cannot do this alone; his eyes are upturned toward the heavens, as if to look up to the gods and beg for help. His facial expression is one of contemplation and almost defeat, as if he knows the fate he will face along with his army in the battle.

The contrast of the only other static man to the right of the leader serves to show that though Leonidas's figure is static, his risen state defines him as the ruler. The figures in the right background look up to Leonidas, signaling that the company sees him as divine. His idealized figure contributes to this notion too, relaying the idea of his strength and bravery during this battle. The golden embroidered cape, fancy helmet, and huge shield all contribute to the idea of Leonidas's high status and primary role in this battle.

On the left side, a soldier carves in rock the famous phrase (in Greek), "Go, passer-by, to Sparta tell/Obedient to her law we fell", conveying that Leonidas and his Spartans know their fate and are prepared to die, in the name of their country.

== See also ==
- List of paintings by Jacques-Louis David
