= Medism =

Friendly behaviour towards Persia in Ancient Greece

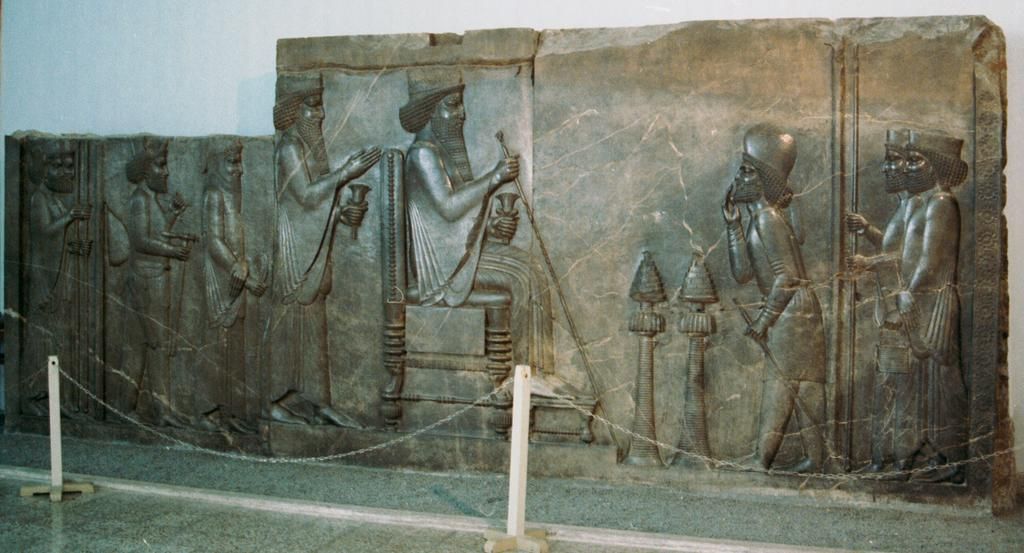
A low-relief stone carving from Persepolis depicting a royal audience, located in the National Museum in Tehran, Iran

Medism (Greek: μηδισμός, medismos) in ancient Greece referred to the act of imitating, sympathizing with, collaborating with, or siding with the Persians. While the term "Mede" was commonly used by Greeks to refer to the Persians, strictly speaking, the Medes were a distinct Iranian people who were co-rulers with the Persians in the Medo-Persian (Achaemenid) Empire. The Greeks began using the term "Persians" around the 470s, as evidenced by Aeschylus' play The Persians in 472.

Medism was generally considered unacceptable and even criminal in many ancient Greek city-states. However, it was not specifically outlawed. In Athens, individuals suspected of medism were charged with treason. Similar attitudes can be observed in other Greek city-states as well. For instance, in Teos, a law from the classical period stipulated that anyone who betrayed the city would face the death penalty, without differentiating between betrayal to the Persians or any other group.

Prominent historical figures were implicated in medism-related controversies. Themistocles, an Athenian statesman, was ostracized for his alleged medism. Pausanias, the leader of the Hellenic League during the Battle of Plataea, was accused of medism by other member states, leading to Athens seizing control of the league. Herodotus mentioned instances of "state medism" in Aegina, Thessaly, Argos, Thebes, and other Boeotian cities. In Athens, astute politicians exploited popular sentiments against medism for personal gain, which resulted in a conflict between poets Timocreon of Rhodes and Simonides of Ceos, who supported and opposed Themistocles, respectively.

== See also ==
- Persophilia
