= Cleomenes I =

Agiad King of Sparta from c. 524 BC to c. 490 BC

King of Sparta
- Reign: c. 524 BC – c. 490 BC
- Predecessor: Anaxandrides II
- Successor: Leonidas I
- Died: c. 490 BC
- Issue: Gorgo
- Dynasty: Agiad
- Father: Anaxandrides II

Cleomenes I (/kliːˈɒmɪniːz/; Greek Κλεομένης; died c. 490 BC) was Agiad King of Sparta from c. 524 to c. 490 BC. One of the most important Spartan kings, Cleomenes was instrumental in organising the Greek resistance against the Persian Empire of Darius, as well as shaping the geopolitical balance of Classical Greece.

== Herodotus's account ==
Most of the life of Cleomenes is known through the Histories of Herodotus, an Athenian historian of the second half of the 5th century. He is one the most important characters of books 5 and 6, covering the decades before the Persian Wars. Herodotus's account however contains many mistakes, especially on the chronology of several major events, and is also very biased against Cleomenes. It seems that Herodotus got his information on Cleomenes from his opponents: the descendants of his half-brothers Leonidas and Cleombrotus, as well as those of Demaratus, the other Spartan king who was deposed by Cleomenes in 491. Herodotus for instance states that Cleomenes's reign was short; however he ruled for about 30 years. Demaratus conversely receives positive treatment in the Histories, even though he betrayed the Greeks to the Persians during the First Invasion of Greece. Paul Cartledge writes that Cleomenes suffered from a damnatio memoriae from the Spartans, notably for having corrupted the Oracle of Delphi in 491.

Other historians, however, identify aspects of the Herodotean account which do not conform with the negative portrayal of Cleomenes by his opponents, demonstrating that his account was not totally influenced by them. The mistake of Cleomenes's reign has often been identified as a fault of the text, rather than of Herodotus: Wilson's 2015 edition of the text therefore amends the passage by adding ἔτι, meaning still or yet, so that it reads "Cleomenes did not reign for much longer". Elsewhere, Cleomenes dutifully reports to the ephors about an attempt to bribe him, and, when campaigning at Eleusis, it is Demaratus who unfaithfully deserts him. Herodotus even explicitly states at one point that, unlike Demeratus, Cleomenes was "working for the common good of Greece".

== Family background and accession ==
Cleomenes was the son of Anaxandridas II, who belonged to the Agiad dynasty, one of the two royal families of Sparta (the other being the Eurypontids). As his father did not have a son from his first wife (who was also his niece), the ephors forced him to marry another woman, without divorcing his first wife—an unprecedented occurrence of bigamy in Sparta. His new spouse likely came from the family of the ephor Chilon, an important reformer, who held office in during the mid-6th-century. Cleomenes was born from this second marriage, but then his father returned to his first wife and had three further sons with her: Dorieus, the future king Leonidas, and Cleombrotus—the latter two were possibly twins. The name Dorieus ("the Dorian") explicitly refers to the Dorian ethnicity of Sparta, and might be a rejection of the ephor Chilon's policy of establishing an amicable relationship with the ethnically different Achaea in the northern Peloponnese.

The family of Anaxandridas's second wife immediately contested the legitimacy of Dorieus even before his birth, as the ephors attended his birth in order to certify the authenticity of the pregnancy. This shows that there were strong familial rivalries among Spartan royal circles; besides, at the same time, a cousin of Anaxandridas's second wife was also the bride of the future Eurypontid king Leotychidas. In turn, when his father died, Cleomenes's succession was contested by Dorieus, because of his superior "manly virtue". Perhaps this statement is related to a great performance during the agoge—the rigorous military training at Sparta—which Dorieus had to endure, while Cleomenes avoided it as heir-apparent (the only possible exemption). Dorieus could have also contested Cleomenes's legitimacy on the ground that he was a son of the king's first wife, who was additionally of royal descent. As Cleomenes was the eldest son, his claim was nevertheless deemed stronger and he became king. It prompted the departure of Dorieus to colonial ventures in Libya and Sicily, where he died in c.510.

The date of Cleomenes's accession had been debated among modern scholars for a long time, until historian David Harvey found that the Greek historian Diodoros of Sicily had confused the length of Cleomenes II's reign (370–309) with that of his earlier namesake. Putting aside Diodoros's error, Harvey states that as Cleomenes came to the throne "a few years earlier than the Plataea incident", he dates the start of his reign to 524–523.

== Reign ==
During the first years of his reign, Cleomenes adopted prudent diplomacy, rejecting foreign expeditions when solicited, possibly due to the threat of a helot revolt that a defeat in a war abroad would cause.

=== Encounter at Plataea (519 BC) ===
The first known deed of Cleomenes as king is his dealing with the city of Plataea, located between Thebes and Athens. In 519, Herodotus states that Cleomenes happened to be in the vicinity of Plataea, when the Plataeans requested an alliance with Sparta, which he rejected. Instead he advised them to ally themselves with Athens, because he wanted to stir a border conflict between Thebes and Athens, two of the most powerful poleis of central Greece. The Plataeans probably wished to avoid their forced incorporation into the Boeotian League, which was being built by Thebes at this time. Their Spartan alliance request perhaps indicates that they wanted to become a member of the Peloponnesian League, which was likewise being put in place at this time. G. E. M. de Ste. Croix and Paul Cartledge call this move "a master-stroke" of diplomacy, but other modern scholars do not believe it was Cleomenes's intention to create a rift between Thebes and Athens.

Herodotus does not explain why Cleomenes was near Plataea at that time. A number of theories have been advanced to explain it. Perhaps he was marching on Thebes to support an invasion of his ally, Lattamyas of Thessaly, but as the Thebans had defeated the Thessalians at the Battle of Ceressus before he arrived, he took the opportunity to try and undermine them without engaging his forces. Another possibility is that he was trying to convince either Megara or Thebes to join the Peloponnesian League, or he was arbitrating between Megara and Athens over the island of Salamis.

The date of this event has been challenged by some modern scholars, who have often suggested 509 rather than 519, as it would better fit with Cleomenes's latter involvement in Athenian politics, but the majority view remains in favour of 519.

=== Foreign embassies (c.517–c.513 BC) ===
In c.516, Cleomenes received an embassy from Maeandrius of Samos asking him for help to expel the tyrant Syloson, a puppet of the Persian Empire, which was at the time was subjugating the city-states of the eastern Aegean Sea. However, with the support of the ephors, Cleomenes refused and they expelled Maeandrius from the Peloponnese. Perhaps Cleomenes did not want to commit the Peloponnesian League to long-distance wars, especially against the Persian Empire. Maeandrius's intentions may have also played a role, as he probably coveted the tyranny of Samos.

In about 513, Darius the Great invaded Scythia, which prompted the latter to send an embassy to Sparta in order to request an alliance against the Persians. Herodotus says the Scythians offered to go from the river Phasis to Media, while the Spartans would march east from Ephesus. This story is however suspect, as the Scythian ambassadors later resurfaced to explain the death of Cleomenes, and the proposed alliance looks like a Pan-Hellenic fantasy of Herodotus'. An alternative date of after 494 BC has been proposed, because the mention of Ephesus by Herodotus implies that the city was not under Persian control, which only happened after the Ionian Revolt of 499 – 494.

=== Interventions into Athenian politics (511–501 BC) ===
==== Sparta's War against Hippias (c.511–510 BC) ====
In the 500s, Cleomenes meddled four times in Athenian politics, which ultimately led to the creation of democracy in Athens. The powerful, but exiled, Alcmaeonid family of Athens bribed the Oracle of Apollo at Delphi to tell the Spartans that they would not have access to the Oracle unless they removed the tyranny of the Peisistratid dynasty, who had held power in Athens since 561. The first Spartan expedition, headed by Anchimolus, took place in c.511, but was defeated by the tyrant Hippias, son of Pisistratus, thanks to the help he received from his Thessalian allies, who had sent a force of 1000 cavalrymen.

In 510, Sparta sent a bigger force commanded by Cleomenes, who went to Attica by land. The Spartans defeated the Thessalian mercenaries of Hippias, then besieged Hippias in the Acropolis, where he had sought shelter with his supporters. The tyrant surrendered after the Spartans captured his sons by chance; he then went into exile in the Persian Empire. The war against Hippias was consistent with the policy of removing tyrants followed by Sparta during the late 6th century. Moreover, the tyrants of Athens were known for their Persian sympathies (called Medism), which Cleomenes started to vigorously fight throughout Greece at this time. Hippias was also a friend of Argos, another one of Sparta's enemies. Embarrassed by owing the fall of the tyranny to the intervention of a Spartan king, the Athenians later promoted instead the story of Harmodius and Aristogeiton, who had murdered Hippias's brother Hipparchus in 514.

Another reason for the Spartan interventions in Athens may be the defection of Megara from the Peloponnesian League, perhaps at the instigation of Hippias. This would also be the reason why Anchimolus had to use ships to reach Attica, since the Isthmus of Corinth was cut off. Cleomenes then forced Megara back into the League in 511/510. Moreover, Plutarch mentions that at the time of Solon, Sparta acted as arbitrator between Athens and Megara for the ownership of Salamis, an island in the Saronic Gulf. But as Cleomenes is cited as one of the arbiters, several modern scholars place the settlement in c.510, just after the war, because Cleomenes finally decided in favour of Athens, probably to punish Megara for its defection, and also to bring Athens into the Peloponnesian League. This theory remains controversial as several other opinions place the Megara arbitration in c.519, at the same time as the Plataea incident.

==== Athenian Revolution (507 BC) ====
In Athens, a struggle took place between aristocratic factions headed by Cleisthenes and Isagoras for the control of the city. The pro-Spartan oligarch Isagoras became archon in 508/507, but Cleisthenes promised democratic reforms in order to gain greater support among the citizenry and expand his power-base. Now on the losing side, Isagoras called for help from his friend Cleomenes, who it was rumoured was also in love with Isagoras's wife. Cleomenes obtained the exile of Cleisthenes through diplomacy, but Isagoras still felt unsafe, and requested intervention by his Spartan friend. Cleomenes personally came to Athens with a small bodyguard, possibly thinking that his prestige would be enough to change the political course of the city. Cleomenes expelled 700 families linked to Cleisthenes, and also wanted to establish a narrow oligarchy or a tyranny, by suppressing Athens's council (boule) and creating instead a new council of 300 men filled with Isagoras's supporters. However, the boule rejected the dissolution order; this act of resistance triggered a large revolt among the Athenians. Taken by surprise, Cleomenes and Isagoras sought shelter on the Acropolis, where they were besieged.

While stuck on the Acropolis, Cleomenes tried to enter the Old Temple of Athena Polias, but the priestess barred him access, saying that the temple was forbidden to Dorians—the ethnic group of the Spartans (Athenians were Ionians). Cleomenes likely wanted to show his strength by making a sacrifice in a forbidden place, which was a typical behaviour for conquerors and notably Spartan commanders. Even though the priestess of Athena was the most important cleric in Athens, Herodotus chose not to give her name in order to make her speak as the goddess resisting the Spartan invasion. Cleomenes famously replied: "Woman, I am not Dorian but Achaean". In this context, the Achaeans were the Greeks of Homer's poems. The name recalls the ephor Chilon's policy of appropriating their heritage in the middle of the 6th century. A descendant of Chilon, Cleomenes therefore attempted to present himself as less alien to the Athenians by claiming an Achaean identity. His reply to the priestess also conveys a second meaning, as it can be translated by "I am not Dorieus", the name of his rival half-brother.

In the third day of the siege, Cleomenes realised that his position was hopeless, and negotiated a surrender: the Spartans were allowed to leave with Isagoras, but the supporters of the latter were massacred.

==== Boeotian War (506 BC) ====
Revengeful after the humiliation he suffered, Cleomenes set up a large coalition against Athens, gathering the Peloponnesian League, Boeotia, and Chalcis (on the island of Euboea), which pushed Athens to seek an alliance with Persia—another reason for Cleomenes's intervention. The goal was again to install Isagoras as tyrant. However, once the Peloponnesian army arrived at Eleusis in Western Attica, the Corinthians refused to continue and returned home. Demaratus, the Eurypontid king, similarly disagreed with Cleomenes and took the rest of the allies with him back to the Peloponnese, thus effectively calling off the invasion. As a result, the Athenians easily defeated the Boeotians, then Chalkis. The most frequent explanation for the Corinthians' decision is that they ignored Cleomenes's plan to install a tyrant in Athens; they thought would be an unjust act once they learned about it.

Several modern historians find this change of mood unconvincing and have offered alternative theories. Lawrence Tritle has suggested instead that after Cleomenes retreated from the Acropolis, he captured Eleusis and left Isagoras in charge there until his return with the full army. The following year, the Spartans and their allies discovered at Eleusis that Athens had retaken this city; without a secure base in Attica, the whole expedition appeared hopeless and was cancelled. Simon Hornblower thinks that the Peloponnesians only learned about the alliance between Athens and Persia once they reached Eleusis, and they did not want to go to war with the latter.

While near Eleusis, Cleomenes may have destroyed some trees in the sacred area of the city, probably for military reasons.

This failed invasion had several consequences. Firstly, a law was passed in Sparta forbidding the two kings to go on campaign at the same time, in order to avoid another dangerous disagreement on the field. Secondly, the organisation of the Peloponnesian League was considerably amended. Sparta had to concede its allies the creation of a League congress, in which the allies could vote on declaring war and making peace.

A few years later, possibly in 504, the first recorded congress of the Peloponnesian League took place in Sparta, during which the restoration of Hippias to Athens was debated. The Spartans wished to restore him because they said they had been tricked by the false oracles of the Alcmeonids, which prompted the removal of Hippias in 510. Hippias was present and pleaded his cause in Sparta, but the allies led by Corinth rejected the proposal. Hippias then left Greece for good, perhaps to the island of Chios. Although some scholars have assumed this reversal of Sparta's foreign policy was Cleomenes's doing, it seems that he played no part in this, because Herodotus does not mention him at all. Ste.Croix instead writes that Sparta's support of Hippias came from Cleomenes's opponents in the city, who considered the new regime in Athens to be more hostile to Sparta than Hippias.

=== The Ionian Revolt and its Aftermath ===
In 499, Aristagoras, the tyrant of Miletus, came to Sparta to request help from King Cleomenes with the Ionian Revolt against Persia. Aristagoras nearly persuaded Cleomenes to help, promising an easy conquest of Persia and its riches, but Cleomenes sent him away when he learned about the long distance to the heart of Persia. Aristagoras attempted to bribe him by offering silver. Cleomenes declined, so Aristagoras began offering him more and more. According to Herodotus, once Aristagoras offered Cleomenes 50 talents of silver, Cleomenes's young daughter Gorgo warned him not to trust a man who threatened to corrupt him.

=== War against Argos (494 BC) ===
In 494, a fifty years' peace that had been signed between Sparta and Argos expired, leading to a new war. This peace had been possibly concluded after a Spartan victory for the control the Thyreatis, the border area between the two cities, won by Anaxandridas II. Cleomenes's motivations may have been either to weaken a rival in the Peloponnese, or to punish Argos for its Medism. The campaign only involved Sparta, not the Peloponnesian League, and perhaps only Spartian citizens, without the perioeci who usually fought alongside them in battle. They were at least 2,000 Spartan soldiers, with an equal number of helots.

The Spartan army marched north through the Perioecic city of Sellasia, then Tegea, whence they moved north-east towards Argos. The Argives however blocked the way at the river Erasinos. Cleomenes returned south to the Thyreatis, within Spartan territory, in order to board his troops into ships lent by Sicyon and Aegina, two members of the Peloponnesian League. The ships landed on the other side of the Argolic Gulf, at Tiryns and Nauplia, two subject cities of Argos. A large pitched battle took place at Sepeia, near Tiryns, where the entire Argive army was wiped out, perhaps up to 6,000 men. Ste.Croix thinks the battle was "the greatest slaughter of hoplites [...] in any war between two Greek states". The survivors fled to a sacred ground nearby, but Cleomenes put the grove on fire and killed the Argives. He then dismissed most of his army but a thousand soldiers and moved to Mycenae, in the northeast of Argos. On his way, he stopped at the Heraion of Argos, the great temple of Hera, where he committed another sacrilege by flogging the priest who tried to prevent him from performing a sacrifice in the temple. In both cases, Cleomenes had ordered his accompanying helots to commit the sacrileges, probably to shield the Spartiates from the religious consequences.

Cleomenes remained in the vicinity of Argos in the aftermath of the battle in order to create two independent city-states out of Tiryns and Mycenae, thus cutting Argos's access to its best harbour at Nauplia. The reason behind this move was to durably weaken Argos, and possibly to hinder it from receiving troops from Persia. Mycenae and Tiryns joined the Peloponnesian League and remained good allies of Sparta. Despite his crushing victory against Argos, Cleomenes did not try to capture the city, possibly because its defences were too strong, or he failed to install a friendly government. On his return to Sparta, Cleomenes was accused of bribery before the ephors for having spared Argos after the battle. A trial took place before the Gerousia or the ecclesia. Cleomenes explained that after having taken the sacred grove of Argos, the oracle's forecast regarding the capture of Argos had been fulfilled—since they shared the same name, and was therefore acquitted.

=== Deposition of Demaratus (491 BC) ===
When the Persians invaded Greece after putting down the Ionian revolt in 493, many city-states quickly submitted to them fearing a loss of trade. Among these states was Aegina. So in 491, Cleomenes attempted to arrest the major collaborators there. The citizens of Aegina would not cooperate with him and the Eurypontid Spartan king, Demaratus attempted to undermine his efforts. Cleomenes overthrew Demaratus, after first bribing the oracle at Delphi to announce that this was the divine will, and replaced him with Leotychidas.

== Exile and death ==
Around 490 Cleomenes was forced to flee Sparta when his plot against his co-king Demaratus was discovered. Herodotus states that he first went to Thessaly, but such a large detour is implausible, and Herodotus's manuscript has often been corrected to "Sellasia", which was a Perioecic city north of Sparta. Sellasia was still too close to Sparta, and Cleomenes moved to Arcadia.

=== Rebellion in Arcadia (c.490 BC) ===
Arcadia was the central region of the Peloponnese; it counted many small cities that Sparta had always prevented from uniting, applying a divide and rule policy. Upon his arrival in c.490, Cleomenes wanted to unite the Arcadians and requested them to swear the oath of "following him withersoever he might lead". This oath was a paraphrase of the oath of the Peloponnesian League, so it seems that Cleomenes tried to make them shift their allegiance from Sparta to himself, then turn against Sparta at the head of a personal union with the Arcadians. He might have promised them that if they helped him to regain his place in Sparta, he would recognise Arcadia as a single political unit. According to Herodotus, the oath would have been taken in the city of Nonacris, by the Styx—the river of the Underworld, where normally only gods swore oaths—therefore making Cleomenes commit another sacrilege and suffering from "divine megalomania".

Based on Arcadian coins produced in the first half of the 5th century, several historians have even considered that Cleomenes created the first Arcadian League, whereas this federal structure only appear in ancient sources after the Spartan defeat at Leuctra in 371. However, more recent studies have shown that this coinage was probably not political, but connected to the festival of Zeus Lykaios, and that Cleomenes never completed his plans in Arcadia. The wording in Herodotus implies that the oath by the Styx was never taken.

=== Revolt of the helots ===
The Spartans arrived late at the Battle of Marathon against Persia in 490. Their official explanation was that they had to finish a religious festival, but the philosopher Plato mentioned that it was caused by a revolt of the helots in Messenia, which several historians have linked to the activities of Cleomenes against Sparta at the time. Cleomenes could have promised the helots an improvement of their condition in exchange for help, as did his nephew the regent Pausanias a few years later. In support of this theory, the city of Messena in Sicily, was founded in c.488 by refugees from Messenia, and the Spartans made a dedication at Olympia after a victory against the Messenians at the beginning of the 5th century. Facing the threat of a combined revolt from Arcadia and Messenia, the Spartan authorities, notably the ephors, recalled Cleomenes to Sparta.

=== Return to Sparta and death ===
However, according to Herodotus, Cleomenes was by this time considered to be insane. The Spartans, fearing what he was capable of put him in prison. By the command of his half-brothers, Leonidas I and Cleombrotus, Cleomenes was placed in chains. He died in prison in mysterious circumstances, with the Spartan authorities claiming his death was suicide due to insanity.

While in prison, Cleomenes was found dead with his death being ruled as suicide by self-mutilation. He apparently convinced the helot guarding him into giving him a knife, with which he slashed his shins, thighs and belly in an especially brutal suicide. He was succeeded by the elder of his surviving half-brothers Leonidas I, who then married Cleomenes's daughter Gorgo.

Herodotus gives four different versions that circulated in Greece to explain Cleomenes's madness and suicide. The most common one was that of divine retribution for having bribed the Oracle of Delphi. Alternatively, the Argives said it was for the massacre of the Argive soldiers cornered in their sacred grove after the battle of Sepeia; the Athenians thought it was for his sacrilege of the groves of Eleusis; the Spartans suggested that the wine he drank unmixed with water—a taste he acquired from the Scythian ambassadors who visited him in 514—turned him insane. For Herodotus, Cleomenes paid for his removal of Demaratus. The Athenians' and Argives' versions were coined to suit their own grief against Cleomenes, whereas the Spartan version was designed to absolve Sparta from any accusation of impiety.

The suicide of Cleomenes has appeared suspect to modern scholars, who instead consider the possibility that he was murdered by his half-brother Leonidas, who was next in line. Cleomenes's daughter, Gorgo, seems to have transmitted to Herodotus the Spartan "official version" of her father's death, to which she might have participated as she was married to Leonidas.

== Bibliography ==
=== Ancient sources ===
- Diodorus Siculus, Bibliotheca Historica.
- Herodotos, Histories.

=== Modern sources ===
- Richard M. Berthold, "The Athenian Embassies to Sardis and Cleomenes' Invasion of Attica", Historia: Zeitschrift für Alte Geschichte, 3rd Qtr., 2002, Bd. 51, H. 3 (3rd Qtr., 2002), pp. 259–267.
- John Boardman et al., The Cambridge Ancient History, volume IV, Persia Greece, and the Eastern Mediterranean, from c. 525 to 479 B.C., Cambridge University Press, 1988. ISBN 0-521-22804-2
- Robert J. Buck, A History of Boeotia, University of Alberta Press, 1979 ISBN 978-0-88864-051-2.
- Pierre Carlier, "La vie politique à Sparte sous le règne de Cléomène I^{er}. Essai d’interprétation", Ktèma, 1977, n°2, pp. 65–84.
- Paul Cartledge, Sparta and Lakonia, A Regional History 1300–362 BC, London, Routledge, 2002 (originally published in 1979). ISBN 0-415-26276-3
- ——, Agesilaos and the Crisis of Sparta, Baltimore, Johns Hopkins University Press, 1987.
- George L. Cawkwell, "Cleomenes", Mnemosyne, XLVI, 4 (1993), pp. 506–527.
- Ephraim David, "The Trial of Spartan Kings", Revue internationale des Droits de l'Antiquité, 32, 1985, pp. 131–140.
- W. G. Forrest, History of Sparta, 950–192 B.C., New York/London, 1968.
- Brenda Griffith-Williams, "The Succession to the Spartan Kingship, 520–400 BC", Bulletin of the Institute of Classical Studies, Vol. 54, No. 2 (2011), pp. 43–58.
- Mogens Herman Hansen & Thomas Heine Nielsen (editors), An Inventory of Archaic and Classical Poleis, Oxford University Press, 2004. ISBN 978-0-19-151825-6
- David Harvey, "Leonidas the Regicide, Speculations on the death of Kleomenes I", in Glen W. Bowersock, Walter Burkert, Michael C. J. Putnam (editors), Arktouros, Hellenic Studies presented to Bernard M. W. Knox on the occasion of his 65th birthday, Berlin/New York, de Gruyter, 1979, pp. 253–260. ISBN 3-11-007798-1
- ——, "The Length of the Reigns of Kleomenes", Historia: Zeitschrift für Alte Geschichte, Bd. 58, H. 3 (2009), pp. 356–357.
- Stephen Hodkinson, "Female property ownership and status in Classical and Hellenistic Sparta", Centre for Hellenic Studies, Harvard University, 2004.
- Simon Hornblower, A Commentary on Thucydides, Volume I, Books I-III, Oxford, Clarendon Press, 1991. ISBN 0-19-815099-7
- —— (editor), Herodotus, Histories, Book V, Cambridge University Press, 2013. ISBN 978-0-521-87871-5
- —— & Christopher Pelling (editors), Herodotus, Histories, Book VI, Cambridge University Press, 2017. ISBN 978-1-107-02934-7
- G. L. Huxley, Early Sparta, London, Faber & Faber, 1962. ISBN 0-389-02040-0
- Andreas Konecny, Vassilis Aravantinos, Ron Marchese, et al., Plataiai, Archäologie und Geschichte einer boiotischen Polis, Vienna, Österreichisches Archäologisches Institut, Sonderschriften Band 48, 2013. ISBN 978-3-900305-65-9
- Thomas Heine Nielsen, Arkadia and its Poleis in the Archaic and Classical Periods, Göttingen, Vandenhoeck & Ruprecht, 2002. ISBN 3525252390
- Josiah Ober, "'I Besieged That Man', Democracy’s Revolutionary Start", in Kurt A. Raaflaub, Josiah Ober, Robert Wallace, Origins of Democracy in Ancient Greece, Berkeley, University of California Press, 2007. ISBN 9780520245624
- Jessica Paga, Building democracy in late archaic Athens, New York, Oxford University Press, 2021. ISBN 9780190083571
- Robert Parker, Cleomenes on the Acropolis, An Inaugural Lecture delivered before the University of Oxford on 12 May 1997, Oxford, Clarendon Press, 1998.
- Anton Powell (editor), Classical Sparta, Techniques Behind Her Success, London, Routledge, 1989. ISBN 0-415-00339-3
- Arlette Roobaert, Isolationnisme et Impérialisme Spartiates de 520 à 469 avant J.-C., Leuven, Peeters, 1985.
- J. Roy, "An Arcadian League in the Earlier Fifth Century B. C.?", Phoenix, Vol. 26, No. 4 (Winter, 1972), pp. 334–341
- G. E. M. de Ste. Croix, The Origins of the Peloponnesian War, London, Duckworth, 1972. ISBN 0-7156-0640-9
- Raphael Sealey, A History of the Greek City-States, ca. 700 – 338 B.C., Berkeley and Los Angeles, University of California Press, 1976. ISBN 0520031776
- ——, "Herodotus and King Cleomenes I of Sparta", in Athenian Democratic Origins and other essays, edited by David Harvey and Robert Parker, Oxford University Press, 2004, pp. 421–440 (transcription of a lecture made in 1972). ISBN 0-19-928516-0
- Lionel Scott, Historical commentary on Herodotus, Book 6, Leiden/Boston, Brill, 2005. ISBN 90-04-14506-0
- Martha C. Taylor, Salamis and the Salaminoi, the History of an Unofficial Athenian Demos, Amsterdam, Gieben, 1997. ISBN 978-90-50-63197-6
- Lawrence A. Tritle, "Kleomenes at Eleusis", Historia: Zeitschrift für Alte Geschichte, 4th Qtr., 1988, Bd. 37, H. 4 (4th Qtr., 1988), pp. 457–460.
- W. P. Wallace, "Kleomenes, Marathon, the Helots, and Arkadia", The Journal of Hellenic Studies, Vol. 74 (1954), pp. 32–35.

Regnal titles
Preceded by Anaxandridas II	Agiad King of Sparta c. 524 – 490	Succeeded by Leonidas I
