= Doryssus =

King of Sparta from c. 840 to c. 820 BC

King of Sparta
- Reign: 29 years
- Predecessor: Labotas
- Successor: Agesilaus I

Doryssus or Dorissus or Doriagus (Greek: Δόρυσσος) was a king of ancient Sparta, who reigned for 29 years. Pausanias identified him as the son of Labotas or Leobotes and the father of Agesilaus I. He was killed in battle between the Spartans and the Argives.

Preceded by Labotas	Agiad King of Sparta c. 840 – c. 820 BC	Succeeded by Agesilaus I
