= Anaxandridas II =

Agiad king of Sparta from c.560 to c.524 BC

King of Sparta
- Reign: c. 560 BC – 524 BC
- Predecessor: Leon of Sparta
- Successor: Cleomenes I
- Died: c. 524 BC
- Issue: Cleomenes I Dorieus; Leonidas I Cleombrotus
- Dynasty: Agiad
- Father: Leon of Sparta

Anaxandridas II (Ancient Greek: Ἀναξανδρίδας, meaning "descendant of Anaxander") was an Agiad king of Sparta from c. 560 BC to 524 BC, father of Leonidas I and grandfather of Pleistarchus. Under the leadership of the ephor Chilon, in office during the middle of the 6th century, Sparta ended its streak of violent conquests, such as in Messenia, and adopted a pro-Achaea policy based on diplomacy. Anaxandridas was succeeded by Cleomenes I.

== Biography ==
Anaxandridas was the son of Leon, who reigned during the first half of the 6th century, between 590 and 560 BC. He belonged to the Agiads, one of the two royal dynasties of Sparta (the other being the Eurypontids).

In c. 560 BC, Anaxandridas II, the new Agiad king of the Spartans, defeated the Acadian Tegeatae and compelled them to acknowledge the supremacy of Sparta. By the time when the Lydian king Croesus sent his embassy to form an alliance with "the mightiest of the Greeks" (about 554 BC), the war with Tegea, which during the reigns of previous Spartan kings had gone against them, had, under Anaxandridas II and the Spartan Eurypontid king Ariston, been decided in the Spartans' favour. Anaxandridas II and Ariston also had main carriage of the suppression of the tyrannies, and with it the establishment of Spartan hegemony.

Under the leadership of the ephor Chilon, in office during the middle of the 6th century, Sparta ended its streak of violent conquests, such as in Messenia, and adopted a pro-Achaea policy based on diplomacy. Chilon claimed for Sparta the inheritance of the Achaean kings, who ruled the Peloponnese before the arrival of the Dorians (the invaders who had founded classical Sparta). Consistent with this policy, the legendary Achaean king Agamemnon started to be worshipped c. 550 BC in Amyclae (one of the villages of Sparta). The bones of Orestes and Tisamenus, Agamemnon's son and grandson, were taken from Tegea and Helike following advice from a Delphic oracle, then buried in Sparta. With these appropriations of Achaean heroes, Sparta convinced the non-Dorian Peloponnesian cities to join its alliance, which later became known as the Peloponnesian League. The alliance aimed at containing Argos, Sparta's main Dorian rival in the Peloponnese.

It nevertheless seems that Anaxandridas was opposed to the pro-Achaean policy of Chilon. The king was indeed forced by the ephors to marry a second wife after his first wife did not give him a son. Chilon's influence behind this decision can be detected, because the king's second wife was one of Chilon's relations. The second marriage rapidly produced a son, the future king Cleomenes I, but then Anaxandridas returned to his first wife, and she then bore him three children: Dorieus, Leonidas, and Cleombrotus. The name of Dorieus ("the Dorian") is significant, it likely shows that Anaxandridas rebuffed Chilon's pro-Achaean policy by recalling his Dorian origins. During his reign Cleomenes rejected his Dorian identity and instead claimed to be an Achaean, but was frequently opposed by his half-brothers.

Anaxandridas died in 524 and was succeeded by his son Cleomenes I.

== Bibliography ==
- Paul Cartledge, Sparta and Lakonia, A Regional History 1300–362 BC, London, Routledge, 2002 (originally published in 1979). ISBN 0-415-26276-3
- W. G. Forrest, A History of Sparta, New York, Norton, 1986. SBN 393004813
- David Harvey, "The Length of the Reigns of Kleomenes", Historia: Zeitschrift für Alte Geschichte, Bd. 58, H. 3 (2009), pp. 356–357.
- G. L. Huxley, Early Sparta, London, Faber & Faber, 1962. ISBN 0-389-02040-0
- Mait Kõiv, Ancient Tradition and Early Greek History, The Origins of States in Early-Archaic Sparta, Argos and Corinth, Tallinn, Avita, 2003. ISBN 9985-2-0807-2

Regnal titles
Preceded by Leon	King of Sparta; 560 - 524 BC	Succeeded by Cleomenes I
