= Dorieus =

Agiad Spartan prince (died c. 510 BC)

Dorieus (died c.510 BC; Ancient Greek: Δωριεύς) was a Spartan prince of the Agiad dynasty who is mentioned several times by Herodotus. The second son of Anaxandridas II, he was the younger half-brother of Cleomenes I and the elder full brother of both Leonidas I and Cleombrotus. He tried to found a colony in Cinyps (Libya) but failed. He tried again to establish a colony in western Sicily, but was killed by the Carthaginians.

== Family ==
According to Herodotus, Anaxandridas II of Sparta had married his niece and was devoted to her. For a long time, the marriage was childless and Sparta's Council of the Ephors, fearing that the line of Eurysthenes would expire, asked Anaxandridas to divorce his wife and remarry. Anaxandridas refused and the Ephors then proposed that he take a second wife, even though bigamy was hitherto unknown in Sparta. Anaxandridas agreed and, shortly after his second marriage, both of his wives became pregnant. Cleomenes, who was the only child of the second wife, was the first-born. Dorieus was born to the first wife a few months later and she then had Leonidas and Cleombrotus, who may have been twins, in the following year.

When Anaxandridas died, the Council named Cleomenes as his successor because he was the eldest son. Dorieus challenged the decision but was over-ruled even though, Herodotus says, he was the finest young man of his generation whereas Cleomenes was not right in his head and was on the verge of madness.

== Colonies ==
Dorieus asked the Council to select a body of men who would help him to found a settlement elsewhere. Herodotus says he went off in a fit of temper to Libya and made the grave mistake of not consulting the Delphic Oracle beforehand. A colony was established at Cinyps in the Tripolitania region of modern-day Libya. Three years later, the Greeks were driven out by a Libyan tribe called the Macae who were allied to the Carthaginians.

Dorieus returned to Sparta but soon heard about land in western Sicily which, he was advised, rightly belonged to the Heracleidae, from whom his family claimed descent. This time, Dorieus did consult the Oracle and was told the land was his for the taking so, having re-assembled his followers, he set sail for Sicily. It happened that war was about to break out between the Magna Graecia cities of Croton and Sybaris in the south of Italy. Croton asked Dorieus for help. He agreed and was involved in the attack by Croton on Sybaris. He then progressed with the project to establish a Greek colony at Eryx in Sicily. However, not long after establishing the colony named Herakleia, Dorieus and most of his followers were defeated and killed by the Egestaeans with the support of the Carthaginians. Bury and Meiggs assert that Dorieus was killed c. 510 BC. The remnant of the colonists then went on the southern coast of Sicily and captured Herakleia Minoa.

Herodotus points out that if Dorieus had remained in Sparta and had endured living under the kingship of Cleomenes, he would have eventually succeeded him as king of Sparta, as Cleomenes had no sons. Instead it was Dorieus' younger brother Leonidas who succeeded Cleomenes as king and assumed the mantle of a heroic figure by his deeds in the Persian Wars.

== In popular culture ==
He features prominently in the novel The Etruscan by Mika Waltari.

== Sources ==
=== Ancient sources ===
- Diodorus Siculus, Bibliotheca Historica.
- Herodotos, Histories.

=== Modern sources ===
- Bury, J. B.; Meiggs, Russell (1975). A History of Greece (Fourth ed.). London: MacMillan Press. ISBN 0-333-15492-4.
- Vitaliano Merante, "Sulla cronologia di Dorieo e su alcuni problemi connessi", Historia: Zeitschrift für Alte Geschichte, Bd. 19, H. 3 (Jul., 1970), pp. 272–294.
- Mogens Herman Hansen & Thomas Heine Nielsen (editors), An Inventory of Archaic and Classical Poleis, Oxford University Press, 2004.
- Speake, Graham, ed. (1994). Dictionary of Ancient History. London: Penguin Books. ISBN 0-14-044034-8.
- Alexander Schenk Graf von Stauffenberg, "Dorieus", Historia: Zeitschrift für Alte Geschichte, Bd. 9, H. 2 (Apr., 1960), pp. 181–215.
