= Archelaus of Sparta =

King of Sparta from c. 790 to c. 760 BC

Archelaus

King of Sparta
- Reign: c. 790 – 760 BC
- Predecessor: Agesilaus I
- Successor: Teleclus

Archelaus (Ancient Greek: Ἀρχέλαος, Ἀrkhélaos; reigned from c. 790 to c. 760 BC) was the 7th Agiad dynasty king of Sparta. He was a son of Agesilaus I. Together with Charilaus, he conquered Elis. During his reign, he also conquered the city of Aegys and sold its inhabitants into slavery. He was succeeded as king by his son, Teleclus.

Preceded by Agesilaus I	Agiad King of Sparta c. 790 – c. 760 BC	Succeeded by Teleclus
