= Pleistarchus =

King of Sparta from 480 to 458 BC

King of Sparta
- Reign: 480–459 BC
- Predecessor: Leonidas I
- Successor: Pleistoanax
- Died: c. 458 BC
- Father: Leonidas I
- Mother: Gorgo

Pleistarchus (Ancient Greek: Πλείσταρχος Pleistarchos; died c. 458 BC) was the Agiad King of Sparta from 480 to 458 BC.

== Biography ==
Pleistarchus was born as a prince, likely the only son of King Leonidas I and Queen Gorgo. His grandparents were Kings Anaxandridas II and Cleomenes I. He was born from an avunculate marriage – his parents were uncle and niece. His uncle Cleombrotus was his tutor.

Pleistarchus's father King Leonidas perished in 480 BC at the Battle of Thermopylae. For the early part of Pleistarchus's reign, his uncle Cleombrotus acted as regent; after Cleombrotus's death in 479 BC, Pleistarchus's cousin Pausanias was regent.

It is unknown whether Pleistarchus was married. He died without an heir, and was succeeded by Pleistoanax, son of Pausanias.

He had no known surviving relatives after his death, marking the end of his bloodline.

== Notes ==
Regnal titles
Preceded by Leonidas I	Agiad King of Sparta; 480–458 BC	Succeeded by Pleistoanax
