= Ampheia =

Coordinates: 37°15′51″N 22°04′30″E

Ampheia (Ancient Greek: Ἄμφεια) was a town of ancient Messenia, situated on the frontiers of Laconia, upon a hill well supplied with water. It was surprised and taken by the Spartans at the beginning of the First Messenian War, and was made their headquarters in conducting their operations against the Messenians. Its capture was the first act of open hostilities between the two peoples.

Its site is located near the modern Gardiki.
