= Teleclus =

King of Sparta

King of Sparta
- Reign: c. 760 – 740 BC
- Predecessor: Archelaus of Sparta
- Successor: Alcmenes

Teleclus or Teleklos (Greek: Τήλεκλος) was the 8th Agiad dynasty king of Sparta during the eighth century BC. He was the son of King Archelaus and grandson of King Agesilaus I.

Pausanias reports that Teleclus' reign saw the conquest of Amyclae, Pharis and Geranthrae, towns of the Perioeci or "dwellers round about".

Teleclus was killed during a skirmish with the Messanians during a festival at the temple of Artemis Limnatis, an event foreshadowing the First Messenian War.

He was succeeded by his son Alcmenes.

== Notes ==
Preceded by Archelaus	Agiad King of Sparta c. 760 – c. 740 BC	Succeeded by Alcmenes
