= Nedonas =

River in Greece

- Native name: Νέδωνας (Greek)

Location
- Country: Greece
- Region: Messinia

Physical characteristics
- Source
  - location: Taygetus mountains
- Mouth
  - location: Messenian Gulf in Kalamata
  - coordinates: 37.0245°N 22.1010°E
- Length: 22 km (14 mi)
- Basin size: 146 km^{2} (56 sq mi)

The Nedonas (Greek: Νέδωνας, katharevousa: Νέδων Nedon) is a river Messenia, Peloponnese, Greece. It is 22 km (14 mi) long, and its drainage area is 146 km^{2} (56 sq mi).

== Geography ==
The river rises on the western slope of the Taygetus mountains, at around 1,100 m elevation, near the village Artemisia. It flows in southwestern direction, through a steep and narrow gorge. It is fed by several small tributaries, including the Nedousa. It flows through the city centre of Kalamata, where it empties into the Messenian Gulf. The Greek National Road 82 (Pylos - Kalamata - Sparta) runs along the river for a part of its length.

== See also ==
- List of rivers in Greece
