= Ionia (satrapy) =

Region within the Achaemenid Empire

Achaemenid Ionia
(c. 546 – 479 BC and 387–334 BC)
𐎹𐎢𐎴, Yaunā

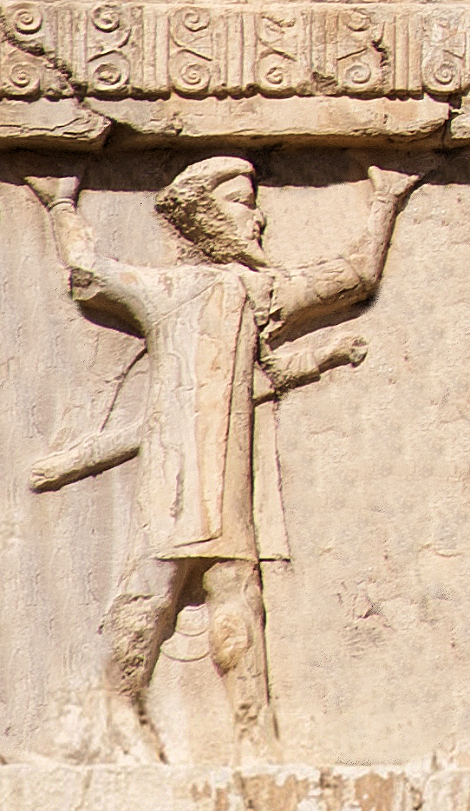
Ionian soldier of the Achaemenid army, circa 480 BC. Xerxes I tomb relief.

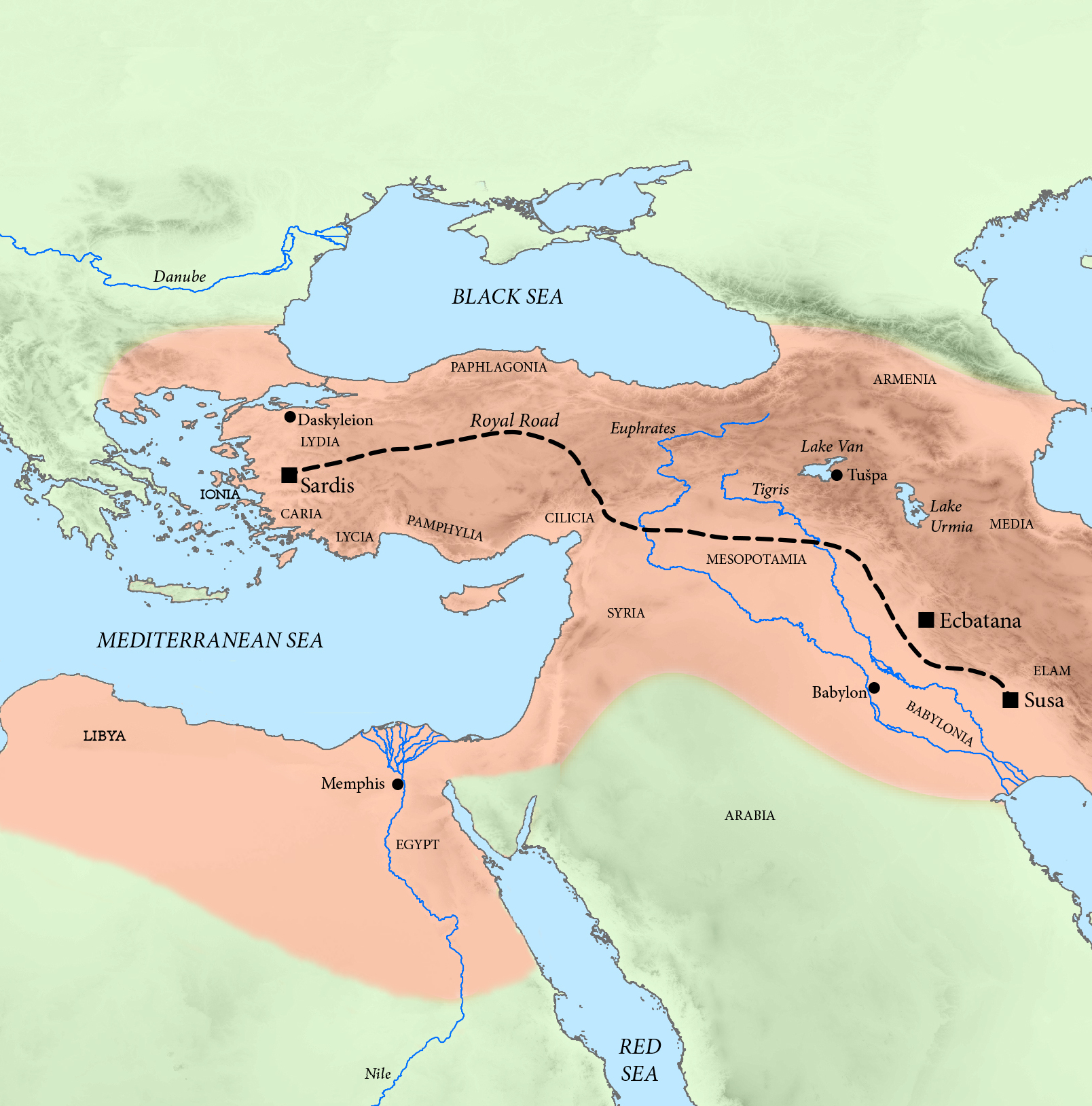
Western part of the Achaemenid Empire, with Ionia, west of Sardis, circa 500 BC.

Ionia, known in Old Persian as Yauna (𐎹𐎢𐎴), was a region within the satrapy of Lydia, with its capital at Sardis, within the First Persian Empire. The first mention of the Yauna is at the Behistun inscription. (Note: [i.6] King Darius says: These are the countries which are subject unto me, and by the grace of Ahuramazda I became king of them: Persia, Elam, Babylonia, Assyria, Arabia, Egypt, the countries by the Sea, Lydia, the Greeks [Yauna], Media, Armenia, Cappadocia, Parthia, Drangiana, Aria, Chorasmia, Bactria, Sogdia, Gandara, Scythia, Sattagydia, Arachosia and Maka; twenty-three lands in all.)

== History ==
Achaemenid conquest (c. 546 – 479 BC)

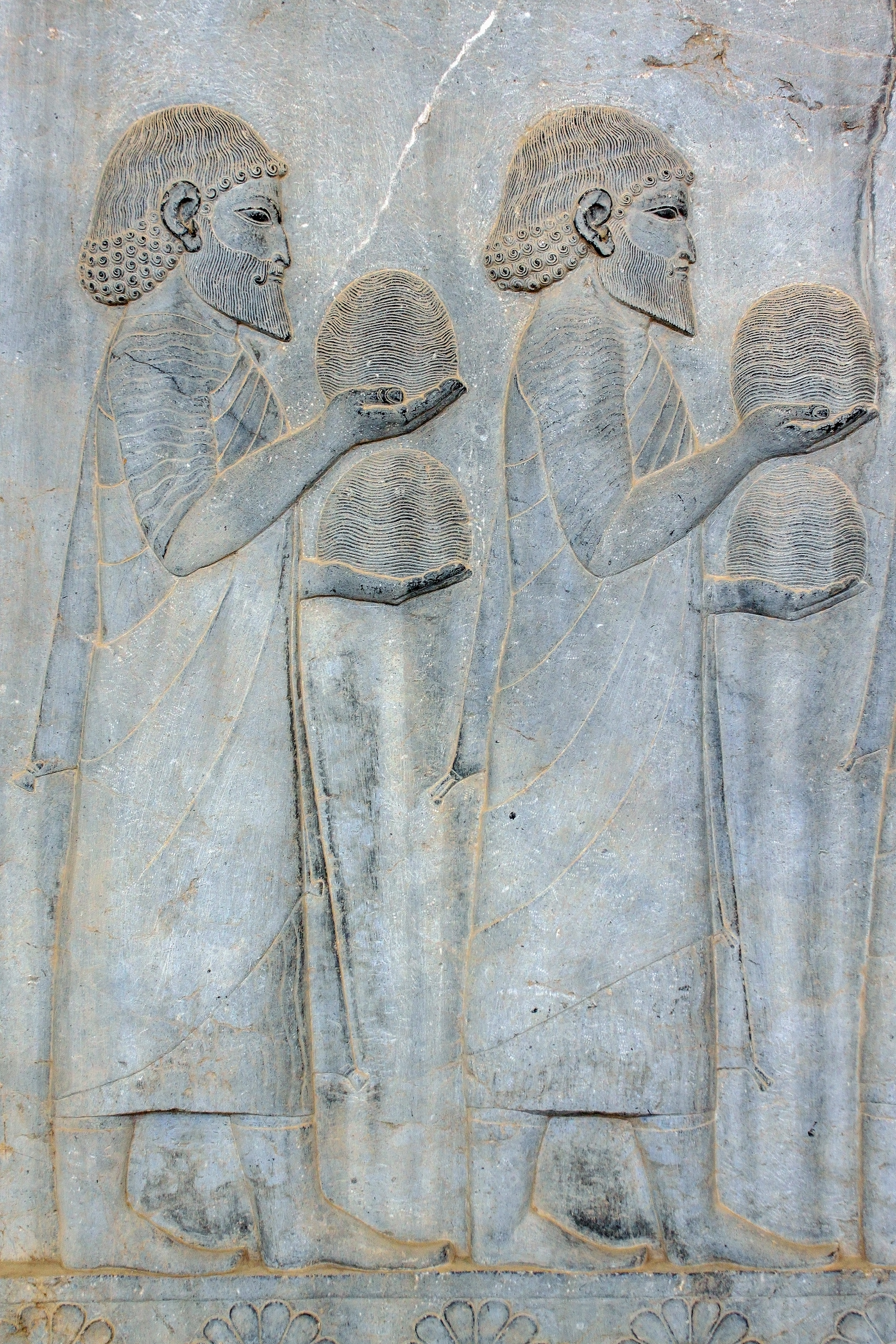
Ionian delegation, relief at Apadana stairs of Persepolis

In the mid-6th century BC, the Ionians were conquered by Cyrus the Great and according to Herodotus, they were placed in the same tax district (the first) as the Pamphylians, Lycians, Magnesians, Aeolians, Milyans, and Carians. It is unclear to what extent the Yauna were advantaged or disadvantaged by Persian rule, and what caused the Ionian Revolt which broke out in c. 499 BC and lasted until 494 BC. The main source, Herodotus, puts it down to the personal ambitions of two men of Miletus, Histiaeus and Aristagoras; modern scholars debate what the underlying reasons may have been; arguments for economic and political causes are variously put forward, but there are no clear sources which can give a definitive answer.

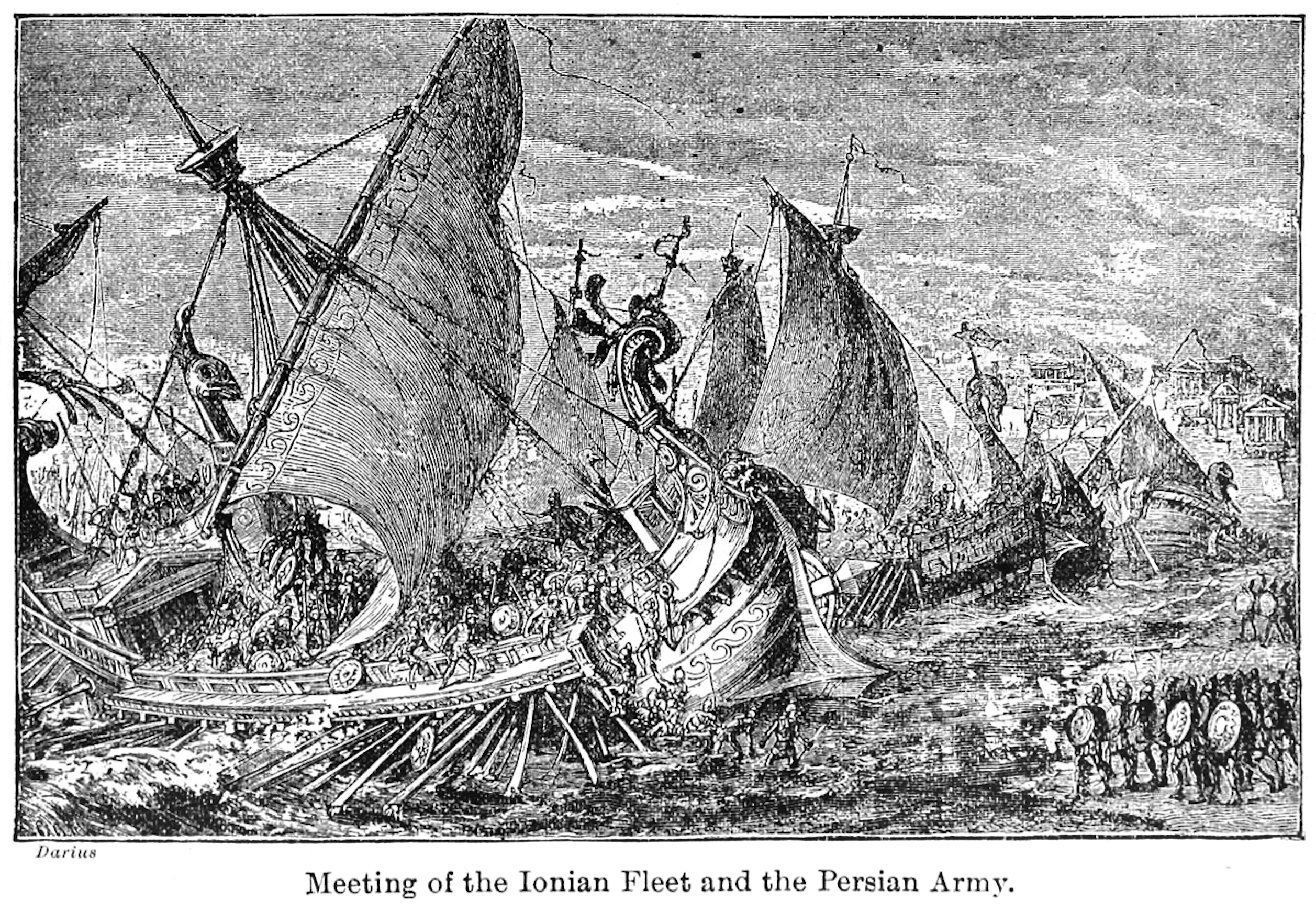
The Ionian fleet, here seen in 513 BC during the European Scythian campaign of Darius I joining with Persian forces, was part of the Achaemenid fleet at the Battle of Artemisium and the Battle of Salamis. 19th-century illustration.

After the revolt was put down, the Ionian cities were subdued by some pragmatic and enlightened measures by the Persian satrap of Sardis, Artaphernes. The Ionians are reported to have served with the Persian forces which were defeated at Marathon by the Athenians and Plataeans in 490, while they also fought on the Persian side during Xerxes' great Second Persian invasion of Greece of 480–479.

Autonomy (479–387 BC)

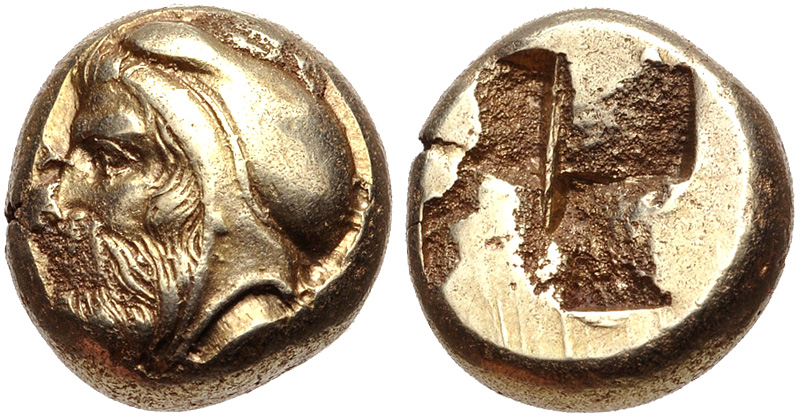
Coinage of Phokaia, Ionia, circa 478–387 BC. Possible portrait of Satrap Tissaphernes, with satrapal headress.

It was only after the Persians were defeated at Battle of Plataea in 479 that the Ionian cities had the confidence to revolt again, defeating the Persian forces at the Battle of Mycale in the same year.

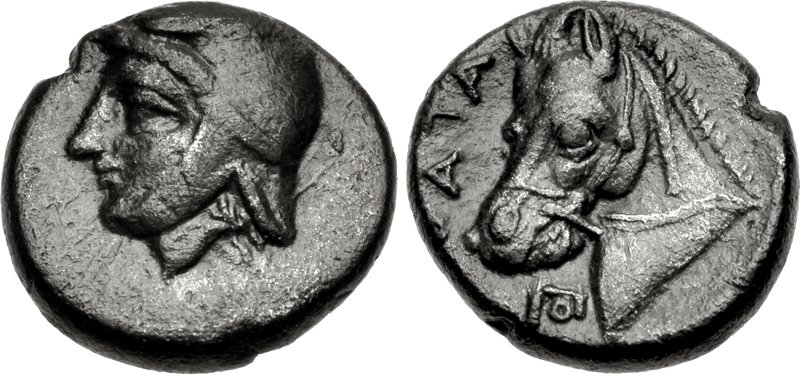
Coin of Autophradates, Achaemenid Satrap of Sparda (Lydia and Ionia), circa 380s–350s BC.

Soon afterwards, they signed up to a common defence league led by Athens, known today as the Delian League. However, these cities soon came under the domination of Athens.

Renewed Achaemenid control (387–334 BC)

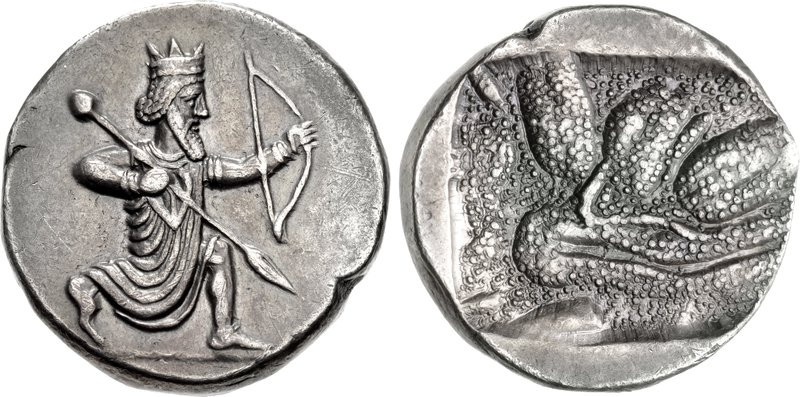
Ionia, Achaemenid Period, emulating Achaemenid coinage. Uncertain satrap. Circa 350–333 BC

After the Peloponnesian War and the destruction of Athenian power, Sparta ceded Ionia back to Persia in the 387 BC with the Peace of Antalcidas. Ionia remained under Persian rule until the campaigns of Alexander the Great in 334 BC.

Apart from Yaunas of the plain and sea, there are also mentioned Yauna paradraya (Ionians beyond or across the sea such as Naxos, Thasos and Byzantium) as well the Yauna takabara (Greeks with sunhats, the Macedonians) in Skudra satrapy.

== Satraps ==
1st Achaemenid period:

- Tabalus (546–545 BC)
- Mazares (545–c. 544 BC)
- Harpagus (c. 544 BC)
- Oroetus (before 530–c. 520 BC)
- Bagaeus (c. 520 BC)
- Otanes (517 BC)
- Artaphernes I (513–492 BC)
- Artaphernes II (492–after 480 BC)

2nd Achaemenid period:

- Tissaphernes (413–395 BC)
- Tiribazus
- Autophradates (c. 365 BC)
- Spithridates (died before 334 BC)

== See also ==
- Ionian Revolt
- Yona
- Skudra

== Sources ==
- Ernst Herzfeld, Gerold Walser The Persian Empire: Studies in Geography and Ethnography of the Ancient Near East, 1968, p. 345.
