= List of satraps of Lydia =

List of all the known Satraps (governors) of Lydia, a satrapy of the Persian Empire:

- Tabalus (546 - 545)
- Mazares (545 - c. 544)
- Harpagus (born c. 544)
- Oroetus (before 530 - c. 520)
- Bagaeus (born c. 520)
- Otanes (517)
- Artaphernes I (513 - 492)
- Artaphernes II (492 - after 480)
- Pissuthnes (before 440 - 415)
- Tissaphernes (c. 415 - 408)
- Cyrus the Younger (408 - 401)
- Tissaphernes (400 - 395)
- Tithraustes (born 395)
- Tiribazus
- Struthas
- Autophradates (c. 365)
- Spithridates (died before 334)

== Macedonians ==
- Menander (323-321)
- Cleitus the White (321-318)
