= 294 BC =

294 BC in various calendars
- Gregorian calendar: 294 BC; CCXCIV BC
- Ab urbe condita: 460
- Ancient Egypt era: XXXIII dynasty, 30
- Pharaoh: Ptolemy I Soter, 30
- Ancient Greek Olympiad (summer): 121st Olympiad, year 3
- Assyrian calendar: 4457
- Balinese saka calendar: N/A
- Bengali calendar: −887 – −886
- Berber calendar: 657
- Buddhist calendar: 251
- Burmese calendar: −931
- Byzantine calendar: 5215–5216
- Chinese calendar: 丙寅年 (Fire Tiger); 2404 or 2197 — to — 丁卯年 (Fire Rabbit); 2405 or 2198
- Coptic calendar: −577 – −576
- Discordian calendar: 873
- Ethiopian calendar: −301 – −300
- Hebrew calendar: 3467–3468
- Hindu calendars
- Vikram Samvat: −237 – −236
- Shaka Samvat: N/A
- Kali Yuga: 2807–2808
- Holocene calendar: 9707
- Iranian calendar: 915 BP – 914 BP
- Islamic calendar: 943 BH – 942 BH
- Javanese calendar: N/A
- Julian calendar: N/A
- Korean calendar: 2040
- Minguo calendar: 2205 before ROC 民前2205年
- Nanakshahi calendar: −1761
- Seleucid era: 18/19 AG
- Thai solar calendar: 249–250
- Tibetan calendar: མེ་ཕོ་སྟག་ལོ་ (male Fire-Tiger) −167 or −548 or −1320 — to — མེ་མོ་ཡོས་ལོ་ (female Fire-Hare) −166 or −547 or −1319

Year 294 BC was a year of the pre-Julian Roman calendar. At the time it was known as the Year of the Consulship of Megellus and Regulus (or, less frequently, year 460 Ab urbe condita). The denomination 294 BC for this year has been used since the early medieval period, when the Anno Domini calendar era became the prevalent method in Europe for naming years.

== Events ==
=== By place ===
==== Greece ====
- Archidamus IV, king of Sparta, son of Eudamidas I and grandson of Archidamus III, is defeated by Demetrius Poliorcetes of Macedonia in a battle at Mantinea. Sparta is saved only because Demetrius is called away by the threatening activities of his rivals Lysimachus and Ptolemy.
- Alexander V of Macedon is ousted by his brother, Antipater II. Therefore Alexander V turns to Demetrius Poliorcetes for help in recovering his throne. However, Demetrius Poliorcetes murders Alexander V and establishes himself on the throne of Macedonia. Antipater II loses the throne but is able to survive.
- Pyrrhus of Epirus exploits the dynastic quarrel in Macedonia involving Alexander V of Macedon, his brother, Antipater II and Demetrius Poliorcetes to take over the frontier areas of Parauaea and Tymphaea, along with Acarnania, Ampholochia, and Ambracia.
- Lysimachus concludes a peace with Demetrius Poliorcetes whereby Demetrius Poliorcetes is recognized as ruler of Macedonia.

==== Roman Republic ====
- Third Samnite War:

- On a road connecting Roman and Samnite territory, the Samnites attack and nearly capture the camp of consul Marcus Atilius Regulus, who retreats to Sora and is joined by consul Lucius Postumius Megellus. The combining of consular armies prompts the Samnite army to withdraw to Samnium.
- Postumius storms the Samnite city of Milionia, and several other towns, including Fertrum, are abandoned by their inhabitants and occupied by Postumius.
- Without senatorial permission, Postumius marches to Etruria, wins an engagement against the Volsinii and storms the town of Rusellae. The cities of Volsinii, Perusia, and Arretium sue for peace with Rome and obtain truces for forty years.
- Atilius marches to Apulia to relieve Luceria from a Samnite siege but is intercepted by the Samnites near the city, where he is defeated by a smaller army. He then wins an engagement against the Volcentes.
- After an unsuccessful attempt to capture the Roman colony of Interamna, a Samnite army raids the surrounding countryside only to be attacked by Atilius, who recovers the booty.
- Against precedent, Postumius has the Comitia Centuriata vote him a triumph despite senatorial opposition.

==== Egypt ====
- Ptolemy gains control over Cyprus and the Phoenician coastal towns of Tyre and Sidon.

==== Seleucid Empire ====
- Stratonice, daughter of Demetrius Poliorcetes and wife of Seleucus marries her stepson Antiochus. Seleucus has reportedly instigated the marriage after discovering that his son by his late wife Apama was in danger of dying of lovesickness as he has fallen in love with his beautiful stepmother.

==== China ====
- General Bai Qi of the State of Qin launches a surprise attack on the State of Han and captures the city of Xincheng.
