= Eudamidas =

Eudamidas may refer to:

- Eudamidas I, king of Sparta from 330 to c. 300 BC
- Eudamidas II, king of Sparta from c. 275 to c. 244 BC
- Eudamidas III, king of Sparta from 241 to 228 BC
