= Hippomedon of Sparta =

Hippomedon of Sparta (3rd-century BC) was the cousin of Agis IV in Sparta. Hippomedon was instrumental in gaining for his father Agesilaus a powerful position under Agis, but Agesilaus mismanaged affairs and they were exiled. Subsequently, Hippomedon was appointed as governor of the cities of Thrace which were subject to Ptolemy III Euergetes.

== Life ==
Hippomedon was a son of Agesilaus, the uncle of Agis IV. He must have been older than his cousin Agis, as he is said by Plutarch to have already distinguished himself on many occasions in war when the young king first began to engage in his constitutional reforms. Hippomedon entered warmly into the schemes of Agis, and was mainly instrumental in gaining over his father Agesilaus to their support. But the latter sought in fact only his own advantage, under the cloak of patriotism; and during the absence of Agis, on his expedition to Corinth to support Aratus, he gave so much dissatisfaction by his administration at Sparta, that Leonidas II was recalled by the opposite party, and Agesilaus was compelled to flee the city. Hippomedon shared in the exile of his father, though he had not participated in his unpopularity. At a subsequent period he was the governor of those cities of Thrace which were subject to Ptolemy III Euergetes. We learn from Polybius that he was still living at the death of Cleomenes III in 219 BC, when the crown would have devolved of right either to him or to one of his two grandchildren, the sons of Archidamus V, who had married a daughter of Hippomedon; but their claims were disregarded, and Lycurgus, a stranger to the royal family, was raised to the throne.
