= Archidamia =

Spartan queen and wife of Eudamidas I (340 - 241 BC)

- Born: c. 340 BC
- Died: 241 BC
- Spouse: Eudamidas I

Archidamia (Greek: Ἀρχιδαμία) (c. 340-241 BC) was a Spartan queen, wife of Eudamidas I, mother of Archidamus IV and Agesistrata, grandmother of Eudamidas II, and great-grandmother of Agis IV.

== War ==
=== Siege of Sparta ===
Archidamia served as Queen of Sparta with her husband Eudamidas I (331 BC – c. 305 BC). In 272 BC when Pyrrhus decided to attack Sparta in the siege of Sparta. Ruling was Archidamia's grandson Eudamidas II in conjunction with King Areus I (r. 309–265 BC). With the pending siege the Spartan Gerousia planned to evacuate the women to Crete. However, Archidamia, speaking on behalf of the Spartan women, entered the Gerousia, "with sword in hand," and contested this proposal, questioning whether the Spartan women were "so faint hearted as to live after Sparta was destroyed". Famously she asked "Spartans! I ask, by the memory of your race, Are ye worthy of the name!" before ending her speech with "her women can die, and be free". With her speech given the Women of Sparta were given a role in the siege.

=== Women in War ===
With the matter settled, the Spartans initiated the construction of a defensive trench running parallel to Pyrrhus's camp. Archidamia direct the Spartan women in task, since it is reported that the Spartan women impressively "completed with their own hands a third of the trench." Consequently, Archidamia led the efforts of Spartan women during the subsequent battle against Pyrrhus, as they are noted for supplying the defenders with weapons and refreshment during combat, and extracting wounded from the battlefield.

== Later life ==
Later records of Archidamia date three decades later, with her assisting in the revolutionary designs of her grandson/great-grandson Agis IV, as he attempted to restore Lycurgan institutions to a Sparta then thoroughly corrupted by wealth and greed. Because Archidamia and Agesistrata were the wealthiest two people in all of Lacedaemon, Archidamia's support of Agis was instrumental in gaining support for the cause. She was among those who first pledged to contribute their wealth to a common pool, which was then to be distributed equally amongst both old and new Spartan citizens.

However, these revolutionary designs were foiled by the corruption of Agis's uncle and erstwhile supporter, Agesilaus, and the machinations of a rival party, led by the Agiad King, Leonidas II. Leonidas and the Ephors had Agis illegally imprisoned and executed, unbeknownst to a mob that had gathered out of concern and a possible desire to see him freed. Archidamia and Agesistrata were subsequently lured into the prison on the premise that they were to see Agis; and there they too both met their ends at the hands of their political rivals. Considering that she must have born her son Archidamus IV before 320 BC, at the time of her execution in 241 BC she was probably far in her nineties.

== Other literature ==
Queen Archidamia has been referenced in other forms of literature. The references include the German work Die grossmüthige Spartanerin, oder, Archidamia by composer Johann Adolf Hasse. More recently Queen Archidamia was referenced in Professor Scott Romine's 'Belles and Poets; Intertextuality in the Civil War Diaries of White Southern Women'. According to Romine Kate Stone drew inspiration from the Queen's famous 'Are you worthy of the name' speech.
