= Archidamus IV =

Eurypontid king of Sparta, c.300–c.275 BC

Archidamus IV (Greek: Ἀρχίδαμος Δ΄) was Eurypontid king of Sparta from c. 300 BC to c. 275 BC. An obscure king, Archidamus is only known for his defeat against the Macedonian king Demetrius Poliorketes at Mantinea in 294, where he might have also died since nothing is heard of him afterwards. This defeat marks the beginning of a long eclipse for the Eurypontid kings, who are not mentioned again until the emergence of Agis IV 50 years later.

== Life and reign ==
Archidamus was the son of Eudamidas I (r. 331–c.300) and grandson of Archidamus III (r. 360–338), who belonged to the Eurypontid dynasty, one of the two royal families of Sparta (the other being the Agiads). He was also the probable brother of Archidamia.

In 294, Sparta went to war for the first time since 331 and the Battle of Megalopolis, where Archidamus' uncle Agis III died. Indeed, after having taken Athens, the king of Macedonia Demetrios Poliorketes invaded the Peloponnese in order to fortify his hold of Greece before fighting the other Diadochi, the former generals of Alexander the Great. Archidamus was appointed at the head of the army sent to meet Demetrios, perhaps because the other king Areus I was still a minor, while the Agiad regent Cleonymus—the most important Spartan commander at the time—was discredited by his failure in a mercenary expedition in Italy. Few ancient sources mention this war: some briefs notes are found in Plutarch and the geographer Pausanias, as well as two anecdotes from Polyaenus, who all wrote four centuries after the event.

Sparta was possibly allied with the Arkadian city of Mantinea, because the first battle took place near Mount Lyrceum in the north of this city, where Archidamus had moved to block Demetrios' incoming invasion. The Macedonian king however won the battle thanks to a stratagem; he set the vegetation on fire, which the northern wind blew towards the Spartans and forced them to flee. A second battle took place near Sparta, which ended with another victory for Demetrios, who made 500 prisoners and killed 200 Spartans. Archidamus might have been among the dead, as he is never mentioned again. The Spartans then restored the city walls that had been built during the reign of Archidamus' father in preparation for a siege, but Demetrios actually left the Peloponnese to fight his enemy Lysimachos in northern Greece. The Spartans still inflicted some casualties to Demetrios' rearguard while he retreated.

This defeat, if it did not kill him, cost all of Archidamus' prestige, as well as that of the Eurypontid dynasty, which disappears from the records for 50 years, until the reign of Agis IV (r. 244–241). For example, the year after Archidamus' defeat (in 293), it is the Agiad prince Cleonymus who is mentioned operating in Boeotia against Demetrios. In addition, nothing is known of Archidamus' son Eudamidas II, not even his date of accession. During this period, the Agiad kings, notably Areus I, de facto ruled as sole monarchs.

The date of Archidamus' death—and the start date of his son Eudamidas II—is not known. The transition date is often arbitrarily set in 275, but opinions range between 294 (if he died on the battlefield) to 260.

== Bibliography ==
=== Ancient sources ===
- Pausanias, Description of Greece.
- Plutarch, Parallel Lives (Demetrios).
- Polyaenus, Stratagems in War.

=== Modern sources ===
- Karl Julius Beloch, Griechische geschichte, Tome IV, book 2, Berlin/Leipzig, de Gruyter, 1927.
- Alfred S. Bradford, A Prosopography of Lacedaemonians from the Death of Alexander the Great, 323 B. C., to the Sack of Sparta by Alaric, A. D. 396, Munich, Beck, 1977. ISBN 3-406-04797-1
- Paul Cartledge, Sparta and Lakonia, A Regional History 1300–362 BC, London, Routledge, 2001 (originally published in 1979). ISBN 0-415-26276-3
- Paul Cloché, "La politique extérieure de Lacédémone depuis la mort d'Agis III jusqu'à celle d'Acrotatos, fils d'Areus Ier", Revue des Études Anciennes, 1945 47 n°3-4, pp. 219–242.
- Ephraim David, Sparta between Empire and Revolution (404-243 B.C.), Internal Problems and Their Impact on Contemporary Greek Consciousness, New York, 1981.
- Ioanna Kralli, The Hellenistic Peloponnese: Interstate Relations, A Narrative and Analytic History, from the Fourth Century to 146 BC, Swansea, The Classical Press of Wales, 2017. ISBN 978-1-910589-60-1
- Gabriele Marasco, Sparta agli inizi dell'età ellenistica, il regno di Areo I (309/8-265/4 a.C.), Firenze, 1980.
- ——, Commento alle Biografie plutarchee di Agide e di Cleomene, Rome, Edizioni dell'Ateneo, 1983.
- E. I. McQueen, "The Eurypontid House in Hellenistic Sparta", Historia: Zeitschrift für Alte Geschichte, Bd. 39, H. 2 (1990), pp. 163–181.
- Pat Wheatley & Charlotte Dunn, Demetrius the Besieger, Oxford University Press, 2020. ISBN 978-0-19-883604-9

Preceded by Eudamidas I	Eurypontid King of Sparta c. 300 BC – c. 275 BC	Succeeded by Eudamidas II
