= Aristodicus of Cyme =

Aristodicus (Ancient Greek: Ἀριστόδικος) of Cyme in Asia Minor, and son of Heracleides. When his fellow citizens were advised, by an oracle, to deliver up Pactyes to the Persians, Aristodicus dissuaded them from it, saying that the oracle might be a fabrication, as Pactyes had come to them as a suppliant.

Aristodicus was then sent himself to consult the oracle; but the answer it gave was the same as before; and when Aristodicus, in order to avert surrendering a suppliant -- which was in context an impious act -- endeavored to demonstrate to the god Apollo (the source of the oracle), that he had given an unjust command, the oracle still persisted in it, and added that it was intended to bring ruin upon Cyme, as punishment for even considering giving up a supplicant.
