= Agesistrata =

Agesistrata (died 241 BC), was a Spartan queen, married to king Eudamidas II of Sparta.

She was the daughter of king Eudamidas I and Archidamia. She and her mother were the wealthiest women in Sparta. She and her mother were initially unwilling to support her son's radical reforms, but was convinced to do so by her brother Agesilaus, and donated their fortunes to finance the reforms. When her son, Agis IV was deposed in 241, both she and her mother were killed.

Issue

- Agis IV
- Archidamus V
