= Archidamus V =

King of Sparta from 228 to 227 BC

Archidamus V (Ancient Greek: Ἀρχίδαμος Ε΄) was the 27th of the Kings of Sparta of the Eurypontid line, reigning during 228 and 227 BC.

He was the son of Eudamidas II and Agesistrata and through him the grandson of Archidamus IV, after whom he was named.

After his brother Agis IV was murdered in 241 BC, he fled to Messenia. In 228 (or 227) he was ordered back to Sparta by King Cleomenes III of the Agiad line, who had no counterpart on the throne by then, after the death of Eudamidas III, the son of Agis IV. He was assassinated shortly afterwards. Polybius claims that he was killed by Cleomenes.

| Preceded by Eudamidas III | Eurypontid King of Sparta; 228–227 BC | Succeeded by Eucleidas |
