= Agiatis =

Spartan queen

Agiatis (Ancient Greek: Ἀγιᾶτις) (died 224 BC), was a Spartan queen, married first to king Agis IV and secondly to king Cleomenes III of Sparta.

== Life ==
She was the daughter of the rich Spartan citizen Gilippo.

Agiatis was described as a beautiful, and was the owner of a large private fortune. She firstly married king Agis IV, and actively supported his radical reforms. After the death of Agis IV, the co-king Leonidas forced her to marry his son and heir, the future Cleomenes III. Agiatis is credited with having convinced Cleomenes of the need to continue the reforms of her first husband, and to have changed his initial dislike of them. When he succeeded to the throne, he introduced the reforms of her first husband. She died in 224 BC.

== Issue ==
- Eudamidas III
