= Epitadeus =

Fictional ephor in ancient Sparta

Epitadeus was an early 4th-century BCE Spartan ephor, who strengthened class distinctions by allowing gifts of land to independent citizens (Spartiates). This 4th century rhetra allowed the Spartiatai to dispose of their private land at will rather than by conventional hereditary descent. This information is derived from a passage Plutarch's Life of Agis, who describes Epitadeus as headstrong and violent, and changing the rule as the result of a quarrel with his son. Epitadeus is mentioned by no other ancient sources, and may well be a fictional character employed to explain the decline in the alleged equality of Sparta.
