= Pactyes =

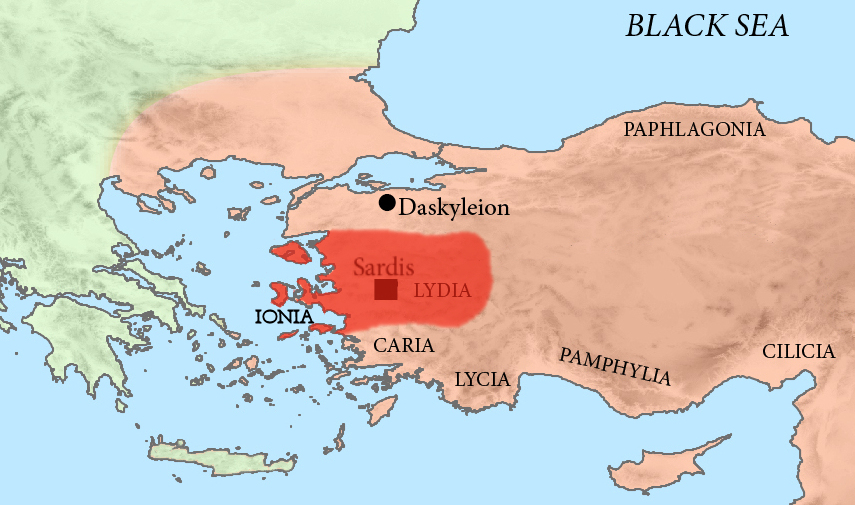
Pactyes the Lydian was put in charge of the civil administration of Lydia, under the Persian satrap Tabalus.

Pactyes was the Lydian put in charge of civil administration and gathering Croesus's gold when Lydia was conquered by Cyrus the Great of Persia around 546 BC:

Presently, entrusting Sardis to a Persian called Tabalus, and charging Pactyes, a Lydian, to take charge of the gold of Croesus and the Lydians, he (Cyrus the Great) himself marched away to Ecbatana, taking with him Croesus, and at first making no account of the Ionians. For he had Babylon on his hands and the Bactrian nation and the Sacae and Egyptians; he was minded to lead an army himself against these and to send another commander against the Ionians.

— Herodotus 1.153

He led a revolt against Cyrus and Tabalus, the Persian military commander or satrap whom Cyrus had put in charge of Lydia:

But no sooner had Cyrus marched away from Sardis than Pactyes made the Lydians to revolt from Tabalus and Cyrus; and he went down to the sea, where, as he had all the gold of Sardis, he hired soldiers and persuaded the men of the coast to join his army. Then marching to Sardis he penned Tabalus in the citadel and besieged him there.

— Herodotus 1.154

When Pactyes discovered that Cyrus intended to send an army against him, he fled to Cyme, whose citizens considered handing him over to the Persians but were dissuaded by Aristodicus of Cyme, who then passed him on to Mytilene, from which he fled to Chios, and was finally captured by the Persians.

== See also ==
- History of Anatolia
- Lydia (satrapy)
