= Samian War =

5th century BCE military conflict between Athens and the island of Samos

Date	440–439 BC
Location	Samos 37°45′N 26°50′E
Result	Athenian victory; Samian surrender

Belligerents
Athens	Samos

Commanders and leaders
Pericles	Melissus of Samos
- Location of Samos

The Samian War (440–439 BC) was an Ancient Greek military conflict between Athens and Samos. The war was initiated by Athens's intervention in a dispute between Samos and Miletus. When the Samians refused to break off their attacks on Miletus as ordered, the Athenians easily drove out the oligarchic government of Samos and installed a garrison in the city, but the oligarchs soon returned, with Persian support.

A larger Athenian fleet was dispatched to suppress this agitation. This fleet initially defeated the Samians and blockaded the city, but Pericles, in command, was then forced to lead a substantial portion of the fleet away upon learning that the Persian fleet was approaching from the south. Although the Persians turned back before the two fleets met, the absence of most of the Athenian fleet allowed the Samians to drive off the remaining blockaders and, for two weeks, control the sea around their island; upon Pericles's return, however, the Athenians again blockaded and besieged Samos; the city surrendered nine months later. Under the terms of the surrender, the Samians tore down their walls, gave up hostages, surrendered their fleet, and agreed to pay Athens a war indemnity over the next 26 years.

During the course of the war, the Samians had apparently appealed to Sparta for assistance; the Spartans were initially inclined to grant this request, and were prevented from doing so primarily by Corinth's unwillingness to participate in a war against Athens at the time. In 433 BC, when Corcyra requested Athenian assistance against Corinth, the Corinthians would remind the Athenians of the good will they had shown at this time.

== Prelude and dispute ==
In 440 BC, Samos was at war with Miletus about Priene, an ancient city of Ionia on the foot-hills of Mycale. Worsted in the war, the Milesians came to Athens with loud complaints against the Samians. Miletus was militarily weak, having been compelled to disarm and pay tribute after rebelling from Athens twice, once in the 450s and again in 446 BC; Samos, meanwhile, was one of only three remaining fully independent states in the Delian League. The Athenians, for reasons that scholars continue to disagree over—some believe that the Athenians were influenced by a desire to protect the Milesian democracy against the Samian oligarchs, while others believe that they were concerned for the credibility of their rule if they failed to protect a state that they themselves had disarmed—intervened on behalf of Miletus. A fleet of forty triremes commanded by Pericles was dispatched to Samos; Pericles established a democracy, and then, after taking 100 hostages to the island of Lemnos and leaving a garrison at Samos, returned home. This had all been achieved with remarkable ease, and this, in comparison with the stiff resistance that the Samians put up later, suggests that they had not expected such a harsh response from the Athenians.

== Rebellion ==
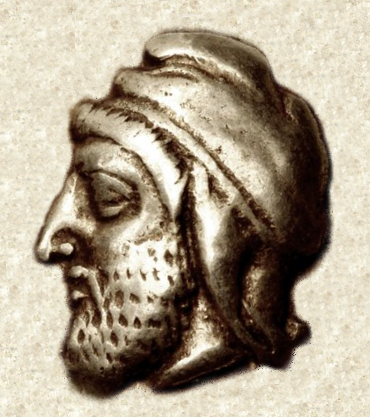
Pissuthnes, the Satrap of Lydia and Ionia supported the Samian revolt.

The settlement thus imposed did not last long, however. A group of oligarchs fled to the mainland, secured the support of Pissuthnes, the Persian satrap of Lydia, who provided them with mercenaries and also rescued their hostages from Lemnos. With their hands thus freed, the oligarchs, collaborating with allies in the city, invaded with the 700 mercenaries of Pissuthnes, defeated the democrats, and handed all the Athenians in the city over to Pissuthnes for imprisonment. Athens now found itself facing a serious crisis in the open revolt of a powerful subject state, and the situation was made more severe by simultaneous revolts in other parts of the empire, the most critical of which occurred in Byzantium; the powerful city of Mytilene, meanwhile, stood ready to revolt upon receiving a promise of Spartan support. The Athenians immediately dispatched 60 ships to deal with the situation in the Aegean. 16 of these ships were sent on various independent missions, leaving only 44 to face the Samian fleet of 50 triremes and 20 transports. In a battle off the island of Tragia, the Athenians were victorious, and the Samians soon found themselves blockaded by land and sea. The Athenians constructed walls around the city of Samos, and meanwhile were reinforced by 65 more ships from Athens, Chios, and Lesbos.

At this point, with the rebellion seemingly well in hand, Pericles received word that the Persian fleet was on its way to attack him, and, taking 60 ships with him, he sailed off to Caria to meet it. In his absence the Samians made a sally and drove the Athenians off. For 14 days they ruled the sea and brought in supplies, but at the end of that period Pericles returned and reestablished the blockade. The siege lasted 9 months, at the end of which the Samians surrendered, tore down their walls, converted their government to a democracy, gave up their fleet, and agreed to pay Athens a war indemnity of 1,300 talents over a period of 26 years. The end of the revolts elsewhere in the empire followed rapidly on this success.

== Sparta ==
Although Athens did succeed in restoring order to the empire, the situation in 440 BC was very severe, particularly because of the threat of Spartan intervention. Thucydides reports that in 433 BC, when Corinthian and Corcyraean ambassadors were making their cases at Athens regarding Corcyra's request for assistance against Corinth, the Corinthians stated that in 440, "when the rest of the Peloponnesian powers were equally divided on the question whether they should assist [the Samians],...we told them to their face that every power has a right to punish its own allies." Modern scholars have generally regarded this as an accurate report, and have taken it to mean that Sparta was willing to go to war against Athens, but that the Corinthians, whose powerful navy would have been necessary for the Peloponnesians to participate effectively in such a war, derailed the plan with their opposition.
