= Foreign War =

War between Knossos and Lyttos (346–343 BC)

Date	346 BC–343 BC
Location	Crete, Greece
Result	Lyttian and Spartan victory
Territorial changes	Knossos' expansion stopped for a period

Belligerents
Lyttos, Sparta	Knossos, foreign mercenaries

Commanders and leaders
Archidamus III	Phalaikos †

Strength
Unknown	Unknown

The Foreign War (Ancient Greek: Ξενικὸς Πόλεμος, Xenikos Polemos) was fought between the forces of Knossos with the help of mercenaries under the ousted Phocian leader Phalaikos and the forces of Lyttos who received help from the Spartans (who were founders of their city) under their King Archidamus III. The war took place in 346 BC.

Knossos wanted to strengthen their hegemony of Crete, but received opposition from the Lyttians. In response Knossos employed foreign mercenaries under the former Phocian leader Phalaikos. In 346, Knossos declared war against Lyttos. Phalaikos, who was given command of the forces of Knossos and of the mercenaries, was about to seize Lyttos when the Lyttians asked the Spartans for help. The Spartans, under King Archidamus, rushed to help the Lyttians. The Spartans came in time to save Lyttos and defeat Phalaikos. Phalaikos then turned against Kydonia. This decision proved fatal for Phalaikos who was slain in the siege and his army was destroyed.

This war proved to be a turning point in Cretan history since it was the first time foreign forces had come to Crete and interfered in Cretan affairs.

== Sources ==
- Theocharis Detorakis, (1994). A History of Crete. Heraklion: Heraklion. ISBN 960-220-712-4
