= Mandrocleides =

Ancient Greek person

Mandrocleides was an influential follower of Agis IV of Sparta's reforms re-establishing the institutions of Lycurgus in the 3rd century BC.
