= Eudamidas II =

King of Sparta (d. 244 BC)

Eudamidus II of Sparta
- Born: Sparta
- Died: 244 BC
- Children: Agis IV; Archidamus V
- Parent: Archidamus IV
- Relatives: Agesistrata (wife)

Eudamidus II (Ancient Greek: Εὐδαμίδας) was the 24th King of Sparta of the Eurypontid dynasty. He was the son of King Archidamus IV, nephew of Agesistrata and grandson of Eudamidas I and Archidamia. He ruled from 275 BC to 244 BC. He married his aunt, Agesistrata.

Two of his sons, his successor Agis IV and Archidamus V, went on to become Eurypontid kings of Sparta.

Regnal titles
Preceded by Archidamus IV	Eurypontid King of Sparta c. 275 BC – c. 244 BC	Succeeded by Agis IV
