= Agis IV =

King of Sparta from 244 to 241 BC

- King of Sparta
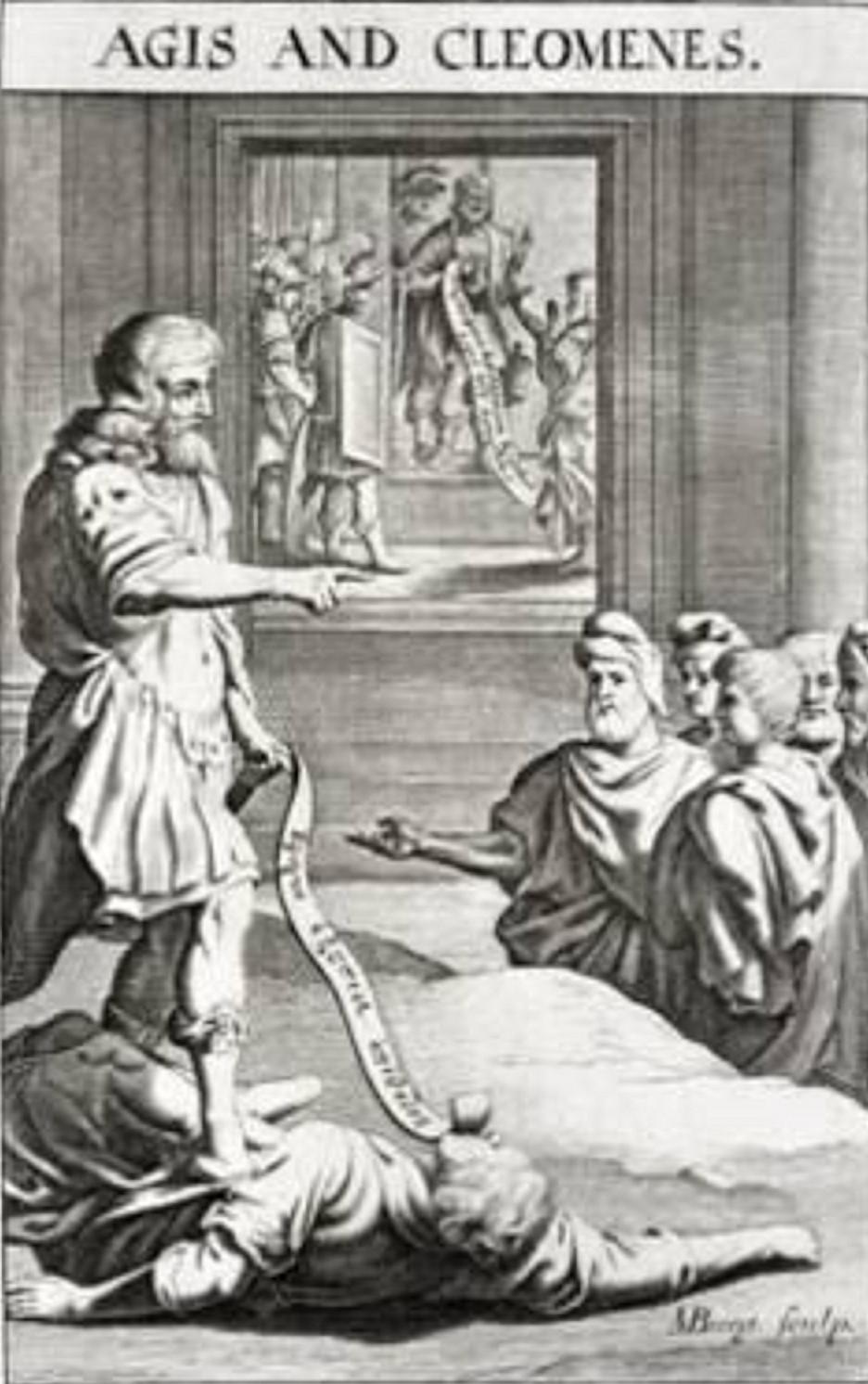
- Kings Agis and Cleomenes, late 17th century engraving.
- Reign: 245–241 BC
- Predecessor: Eudamidas II
- Successor: Eudamidas III
- Died: 241 BC; Sparta
- Consort: Agiatis
- Dynasty: Eurypontid
- Father: Eudamidas II
- Mother: Agesistrata

Agis IV (Ancient Greek: Ἄγις; c. 265 BC – 241 BC), the elder son of Eudamidas II, was the 25th king of the Eurypontid dynasty of Sparta. Posterity has reckoned him an idealistic but impractical monarch.

== Family background and accession ==
Agis was the son of Eudamidas II (r. c.275–c.245) and grandson of Archidamus IV (r. c.300–c.275), who belonged to the Eurypontid dynasty, one of the two royal families of Sparta (the other being the Agiads). The reign of Agis marks a re-emergence of the Eurypontids, who had disappeared from the records since the defeat of Archidamus IV against Demetrios Poliorketes in 294. His father is indeed the most obscure of all the Spartan kings, perhaps due to a mental or physical disability. Eudamidas II's dates of reign are therefore very conjectural. The traditional year of his death is c.245, but he may have died earlier (up to 263), in which case a regent was appointed during Agis' minority, as he was born c.265. The most likely candidate is his uncle Agesilaus, who played an important role during Agis' reign.

Agis' mother was Agesistrata, daughter of Archidamia (also mother of Agesilaus) who played an important role during the siege of Sparta by Pyrrhus in 272. Plutarch tells that they were the richest people in Sparta. Agis also had a younger brother named Archidamus.

== Reforms ==
Agis succeeded his father as king in 245 BC, at around the age of 20, and reigned four years. The interest of his reign, however, derived from the domestic crisis of Sparta at the time of his succession. According to sources, the influx of wealth and luxury, with their concomitant vices, led to the Spartan way of life degenerating from the ancient simplicity and severity of manners, and an extreme inequality in the distribution of wealth. Fewer than 700 families of the genuine Spartan stock (i.e. full citizens or homoioi) remained, and in consequence of the innovation introduced by Epitadeus, who procured a repeal of the law which secured to every Spartan head of a family an equal portion of land, the landed property had passed into the hands of very few individuals, so that fewer than 100 Spartan families held estates, while the poor were greatly burdened with debt.

Agis' program was in four points:

- cancellation of debts: or more precisely, mortgages taken out on citizens' klaros (plot of land), as citizens often got into debts to pay for their contribution to the syssitia, and many had lost their status when the burden became too high.
- redistribution of land: civic lands were redistributed in equal shares between Spartan citizens, former citizens who had lost their status because they could not afford the syssitia, periokoi, and even foreigners—probably mercenaries living in Laconia. In total, Agis created 4500 new lots of land for his new civic body: 700 for the remaining citizens, about 2000 for the degraded citizens, and the rest between periokoi and mercenaries.
- restoration of the agoge, the rigorous military education in Sparta, which had disappeared after the late 270s.
- restoration of the original syssitia, the collective messes, which had evolved into lavish banquets.

Agis, who from his earliest youth had shown his attachment to the ancient discipline, undertook to reform these abuses, and re-establish the institutions of Lycurgus. To this end he proposed the abolition of all debts and a new partition of the lands. Another part of his plan was to give landed estates to the Perioikoi capable of bearing the arms, and to the Metic women, "who had a beautiful appearance and were in prime of their life". His schemes were warmly seconded by the poorer classes and the young men, and as strenuously opposed by the wealthy. He succeeded, however, in gaining over three very influential persons: his uncle Agesilaus (a man of large property, but who, being deeply involved in debt, hoped to profit by the innovations of Agis), Lysander (a descendant of the victor of Aegospotami) and Mandrocleides. Having arranged for Lysander to be elected one of the six ephors, he laid his plans before the senate. He proposed that the Spartan territory should be divided into two portions, one to consist of 4500 equal lots, to be divided amongst the Spartans, whose ranks were to be filled up by the admission of the most respectable of the Perioikoi and resident aliens; the other to contain 15,000 equal lots, to be divided amongst the remaining Perioikoi.

The senate could not at first come to a decision on the matter. Lysander, therefore, convened the assembly of the people, to whom Agis submitted his measure, and offered to make the first sacrifice, by giving up his own lands and money, telling them that his mother, Agesistrate, and grandmother, who were both possessed of great wealth, with all his relations and friends, would follow his example. His generosity drew the applause of the multitude. The opposite party, however, headed by Leonidas II, Agis' Agiad co-monarch, who had formed his habits at the luxurious court of Seleucus II Callinicus, got the senate to reject the measure, though only by one vote. Agis decided to rid himself of Leonidas. Lysander accordingly accused him of having violated the laws by marrying a stranger and living in a foreign land. Leonidas was deposed, and was succeeded by his son-in-law, Cleombrotus, who cooperated with Agis.

== Loss of support ==
Soon afterwards, however, Lysander's term of office expired, and the ephors of the following year were opposed to Agis, and looked to restore Leonidas. They brought an accusation against Lysander and Mandrocleides, of attempting to violate the laws. Alarmed at the turn events were taking, these two convinced the king to take the unprecedented step of deposing the ephors by force and to appoint others in their stead. Leonidas, who had returned to the city, fled again, to Tegea, protected from Agis by Agesilaus, who persuaded Agis and Lysander that the most effective way to secure the consent of the wealthy to the distribution of their lands, would be to begin by cancelling the debts. Accordingly, the debts were cancelled, and all bonds, registers, and securities were piled up in the market place and burned.

Agesilaus, having achieved his goal, contrived various pretexts for delaying the division of the lands. Meanwhile, the Achaean League appealed to Sparta for assistance against the Aetolian League. Agis was accordingly sent at the head of an army. The cautious movements of the Achaean leader, Aratus of Sicyon, gave Agis no opportunity to distinguish himself in battle, but he gained great credit by the excellent discipline he preserved among his troops. During his absence Agesilaus so angered the poorer classes by the continued postponement of the division of the lands, that they made no opposition when the enemies of Agis openly brought back Leonidas II and set him on the throne. Agis and Cleombrotus fled for sanctuary, the former to the temple of Athena Chalcioecus in Sparta, the latter to the temple of Poseidon (or Apollo) at Taenarum.

== Execution and legacy ==
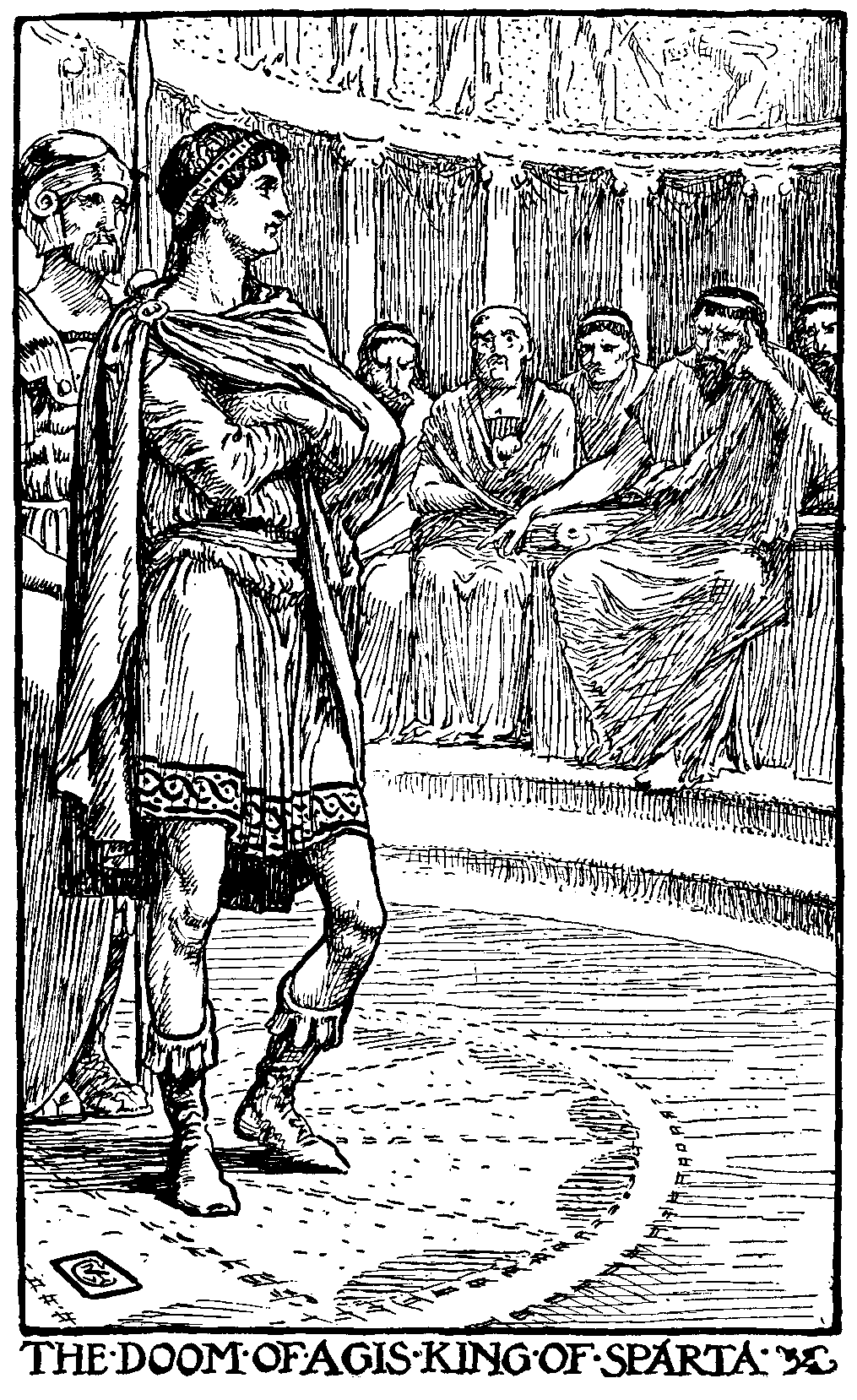
The Doom of Agis, king of Sparta - early 20th-century engraving

Cleombrotus was allowed to go into exile; he escaped death only because of the influence of his wife, Leonidas' daughter Chilonis. While Agis was campaigning against the Aetolian Alliance, the oligarchs succeeded in restoring Leonidas to power and canceling the reforms that Agis had implemented. In 241 Agis was betrayed by some friends and thrown into prison. Leonidas immediately came with a band of mercenaries and secured the prison, while the ephors entered it and went through the mockery of a trial. When asked if he did not repent of what he had attempted, Agis replied that he should never repent of so great a design, even in the face of death. He was accused of seeking tyranny, and quickly executed by strangulation, the ephors fearing a rescue, as a great crowd of people had assembled around the prison gates.

Agis, observing that one of his executioners was moved to tears, said, "Weep not for me: suffering, as I do, unjustly, I am in a happier case than my murderers." His mother Agesistrate and his grandmother Archidameia were strangled on his body. Agis was the first king of Sparta to have been put to death by the ephors. Pausanias, who, however, is undoubtedly wrong, says that he fell in battle. His widow Agiatis was forcibly married by Leonidas to his son Cleomenes III, but nevertheless the two developed for each other a mutual affection and esteem.

Considered by many writers too weak and good-natured to cope with the problems which confronted him, Agis was characterized by a sincerity of purpose and a blend of youthful modesty with royal dignity, which render him perhaps the most attractive figure in the whole of Spartan history. His life and death caught the romantic imagination of several ancient writers. He is the subject of a lost biography by Phylarchus, which was apparently very heavily relied upon by Plutarch when he wrote his own biography of the king.

Agis was succeeded by his son Eudamidas III.

== Agis IV in fiction ==
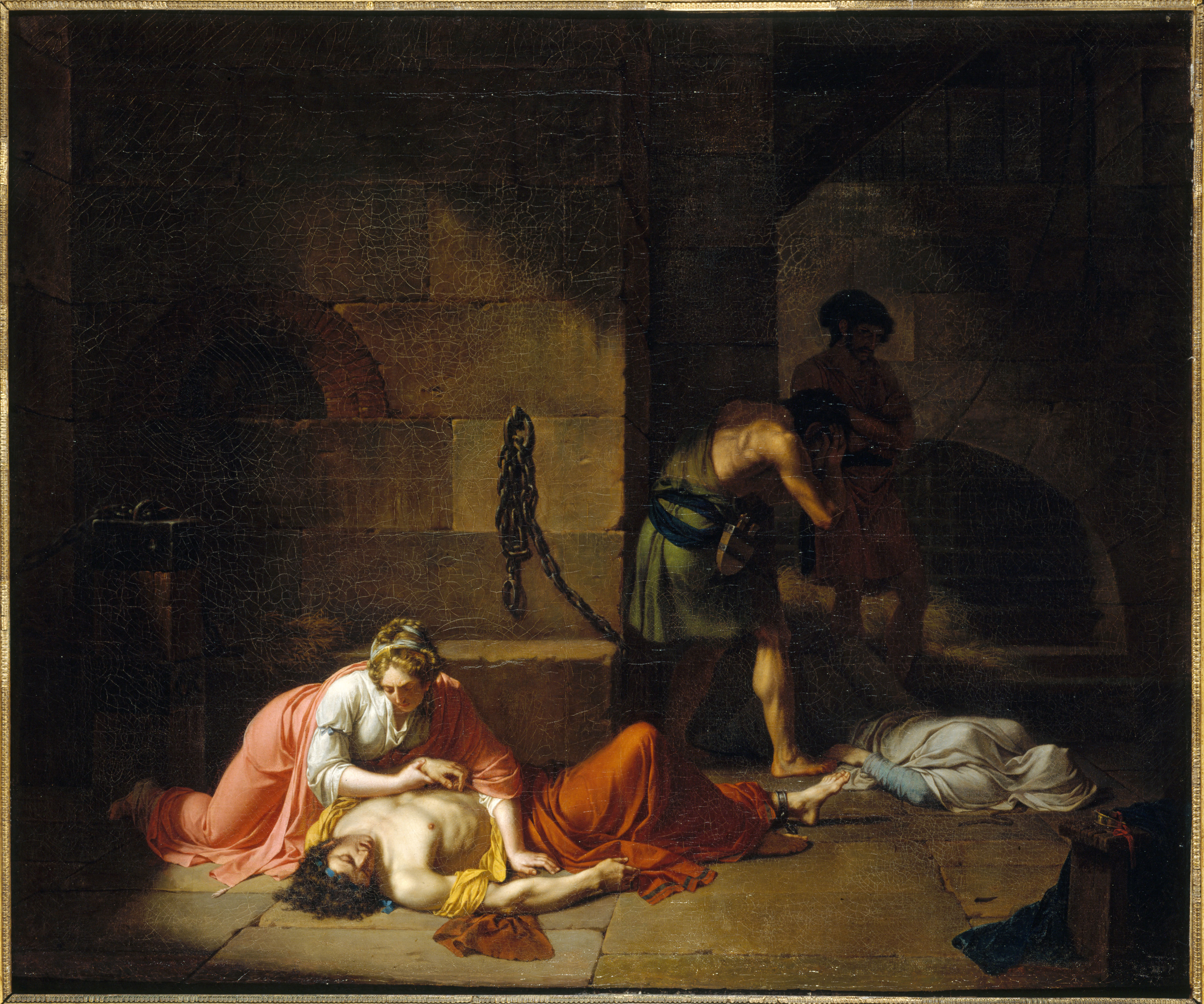
The Death of Agis by Nicolas-André Monsiau, 1789

Agis is the main character in the book Król Agis (King Agis) by the Polish writer Halina Rudnicka. He is also mentioned in the two other books by Halina Rudnicka: Syn Heraklesa (Heracles' son) and Heros w okowach (Hero in manacles). Moreover, he is the main character in the book Αγις (Agis) by the Greek writer Lili Mavrokefalou.

Agis also appears in the play Agis, a blank verse tragedy by the Scottish dramatist John Home.

== Bibliography ==
- Paul Cartledge, Sparta and Lakonia, A Regional History 1300–362 BC, London, Routledge, 2001 (originally published in 1979). ISBN 0-415-26276-3
- E. I. McQueen, "The Eurypontid House in Hellenistic Sparta", Historia: Zeitschrift für Alte Geschichte, Bd. 39, H. 2 (1990), pp. 163–181.

== Sources ==
Preceded by Eudamidas II	Eurypontid King of Sparta c. 245 BC – 241 BC	Succeeded by Eudamidas III
