= Amorges =

Carian rebel leader (executed 412 BC)

Amorges (Old Iranian: (H)umarga, Ancient Greek: Ἀμόργης), son of the Persian rebel satrap Pissouthnes (Πισσούθνης) of Lydia, was the leader of a Carian rebellion against king Darius II Nothus in 413 BC. He was captured by Tissaphernes and executed in 412 BC. During his Carian rebellion, he occupied and was sheltered in the port of Iasus. Athens was sympathetic to him during the Peloponnesian War against Sparta.

Darius II ordered a Persian nobleman named Tissaphernes to stop Amorges, and did so by forming an alliance with Sparta. Tissaphernes created a treaty with Sparta which noted "if anyone revolts from the King, he shall be the enemy of the Spartans as well." Spartans sailed to Iasus in the winter of 412–411 and were welcomed by inhabitants due to a belief that their ships belonged to the Athenian navy. Amorges was arrested and handed over to Tissaphernes.
