= Battle of Megalopolis =

Battle won by Macedonia against Sparta, 331 BC

- Part of the Wars of Alexander the Great
Date	331 BC
Location	Megalopolis 37.4011°N 22.1422°E
Result	Macedonian victory

Belligerents
Macedon: Hellenic League	Sparta

Commanders and leaders
Antipater	Agis III †

Strength
40,000	20,000 Infantry; 2,000 cavalry

Casualties and losses
3,500 dead	5,300 dead
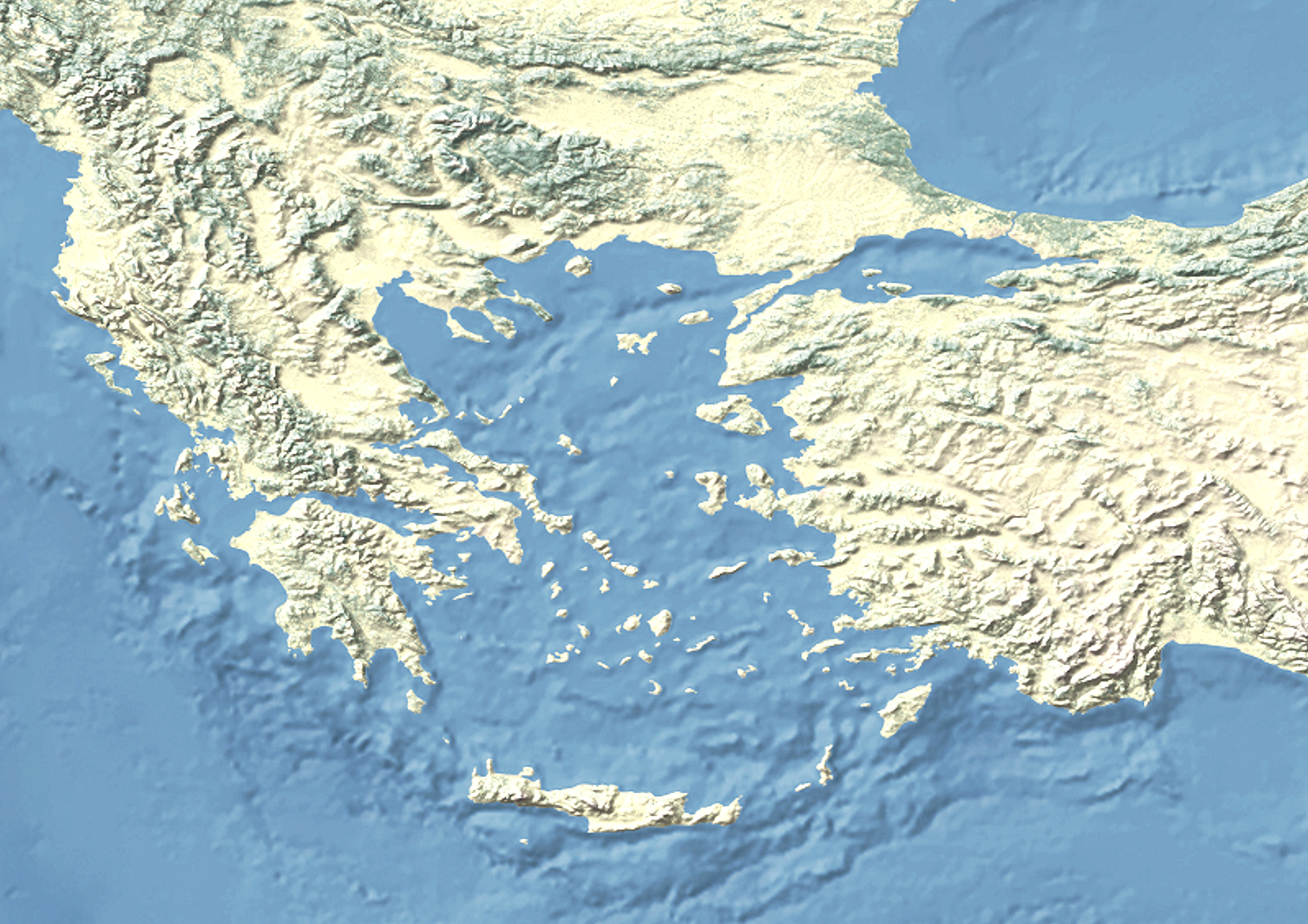
- Approximate location of the Battle of Megalopolis. Battle of Megalopolis (Greece)

The Battle of Megalopolis was fought in 331 BC between Spartan-led forces and Macedonia. Alexander's regent Antipater led the Macedonians to victory over King Agis III. Alexander, warring in Asia at the time, called it a "battle of mice" (Ancient Greek: μυομαχίᾱ), according to Plutarch.

== Background ==
In the autumn of 333 BC, the Spartan King Agis III had met with the Persian commanders Pharnabazus and Autophradates, somewhere in the Aegean Sea, and revealed to them his plans for a war against Alexander—in Greece itself. The Persians agreed to support Agis; however, they could only spare for him 30 talents and 10 ships. Agis also recruited the Greek mercenary survivors of the Battle of Issus - who had served in the Persian army – a force of 8,000 veterans. In the summer of 331 BC, Agis defeated Coragus, the Macedonian general in command of the Peloponnese and the garrison of Corinth. Agis asked for help from the Peloponnesians and Athens, though Athens refused to help the Spartans.

Meanwhile, Antipater, Alexander's regent in Macedonia, was occupied in Thrace where the Macedonian general, Memnon, was involved in a rebellion. After the rebellion was resolved, Antipater marched against King Agis. Antipater had recruited a large force, over 40,000 strong, with a core of Macedonian troops and substantial numbers of tribal warriors from the northern fringes of Macedonia, reinforced with troops from his Greek allies. Antipater received aid from Alexander of 3,000 talents to support in what Arrian names the Lacedaemonian (Spartan) War.

== Battle ==
The final battle, fought near Megalopolis in Arcadia, ended in defeat for the Spartans. Early in the battle Antipater's lines broke, but in the end it was the sheer weight of numbers that brought victory to the Macedonians. It is written that 5,300 died on the Spartan side and 3,500 on the Macedonian side, though it may have been as little as 1,000 for the Macedonians, Curtius agrees that there were 5,300 Spartans killed. For the Spartans that meant a death toll of over 25 percent.

King Agis, now wounded and unable to stand, ordered his men to leave him behind to face the advancing Macedonian army so that he could buy his men time to retreat. Diodorus states that the Spartan king slew several enemy soldiers before being finally killed by a javelin.

== Aftermath ==
After the battle, Antipater remained apart from the peace talks (which did not please Alexander), instead leaving it to the Peloponnesians to organise their own peace terms (Curt. 6.1.17-19). The Spartans were forced to send ambassadors to Alexander, the Tegeans (apart from its "ringleaders") were pardoned and the Achaeans and the Eleans gave 120 talents to Megalopolis for laying siege to their city (Curt. 6.1.20). According to Plutarch, Antipater demanded fifty Spartan boys as hostages, but the Ephor Eteocles explained that such a demand could never be accepted, since it would mean the boys will miss the agoge and be lost forever as citizens.

== See also ==
- Megalopoli
