= Agesilaus (uncle of Agis IV) =

3rd-century BC Spartan noble

Agesilaus (/əˌdʒɛsəˈleɪəs/; Ancient Greek: Ἀγησίλαος; fl. 3rd-century BC) was a Spartan statesman, the uncle of Agis IV, and the father of Hippomedon. When Agis IV began his constitutional reforms in Sparta, Hippomedon entered warmly into the schemes of Agis, and was instrumental in gaining over Agesilaus to their support. Agesilaus was a man of large property, but who, being deeply involved in debt, hoped to profit by the reforms of Agis. Under the cloak of patriotism, and during the absence of Agis on his expedition to Corinth to support Aratus, Agesilaus gave so much dissatisfaction by his administration at Sparta, that Leonidas II was recalled by the opposite party, and Agesilaus was compelled to flee the city, aided by his son.
