= Pissuthnes =

Achaemenid satrap of Lydia from c. 440 to 415 BCE

- Πισσούθνης
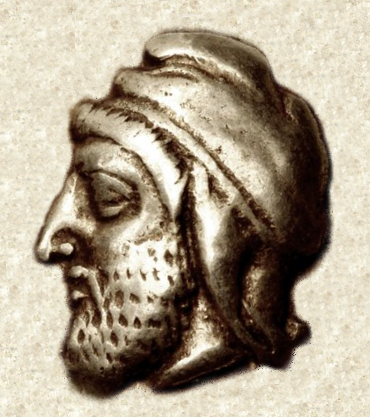
- Anonymous portrait of a Satrap of Asia Minor, around the time of Pissuthnes. From a coin of Ionia, Phokaia, circa 478-387 BCE.

Satrap of Lydia
- In office 440 – 415 BCE
- Preceded by: Artaphernes
- Succeeded by: Tissaphernes

Personal details
- Born: 5th century BCE
- Died: 5th century BCE Susa, Lydia, Persian empire

Military service
- Allegiance: Achaemenid Empire

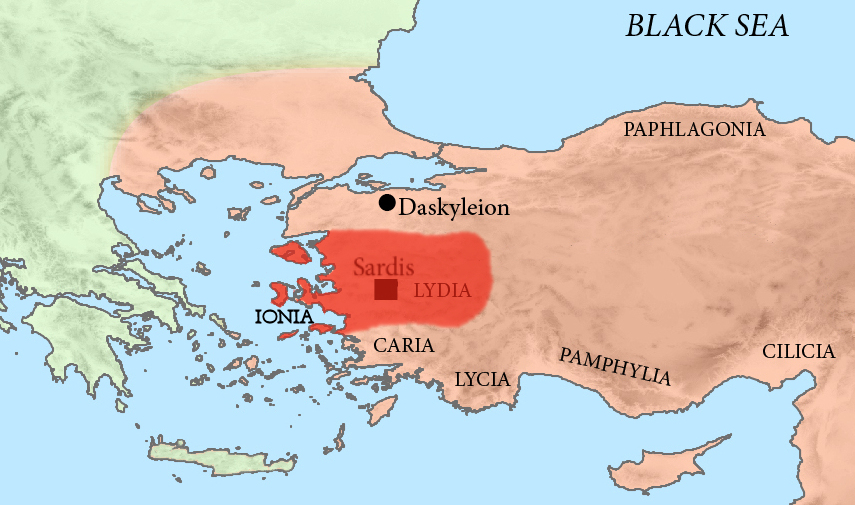
Pissuthnes was satrap of Lydia, including Ionia.

Pissuthnes, also known as Pissouthnes, (Old Persian: *Pišišyauθnah; Ancient Greek: Πισσούθνης Pissoúthnēs) was an Achaemenid satrap of Lydia, which included Ionia, circa 440–415 BCE. His capital was Sardis. He was the son of Hystaspes, probably himself the son of Darius I, which shows his Persian origin and his membership of the Achaemenid dynasty. He held the satrapy for over twenty years, and became extremely rich as a consequence.

He helped the Samians in the Samian Revolt against Athens, and supported various oligarchical movements against Athens along the coast of Asia Minor.

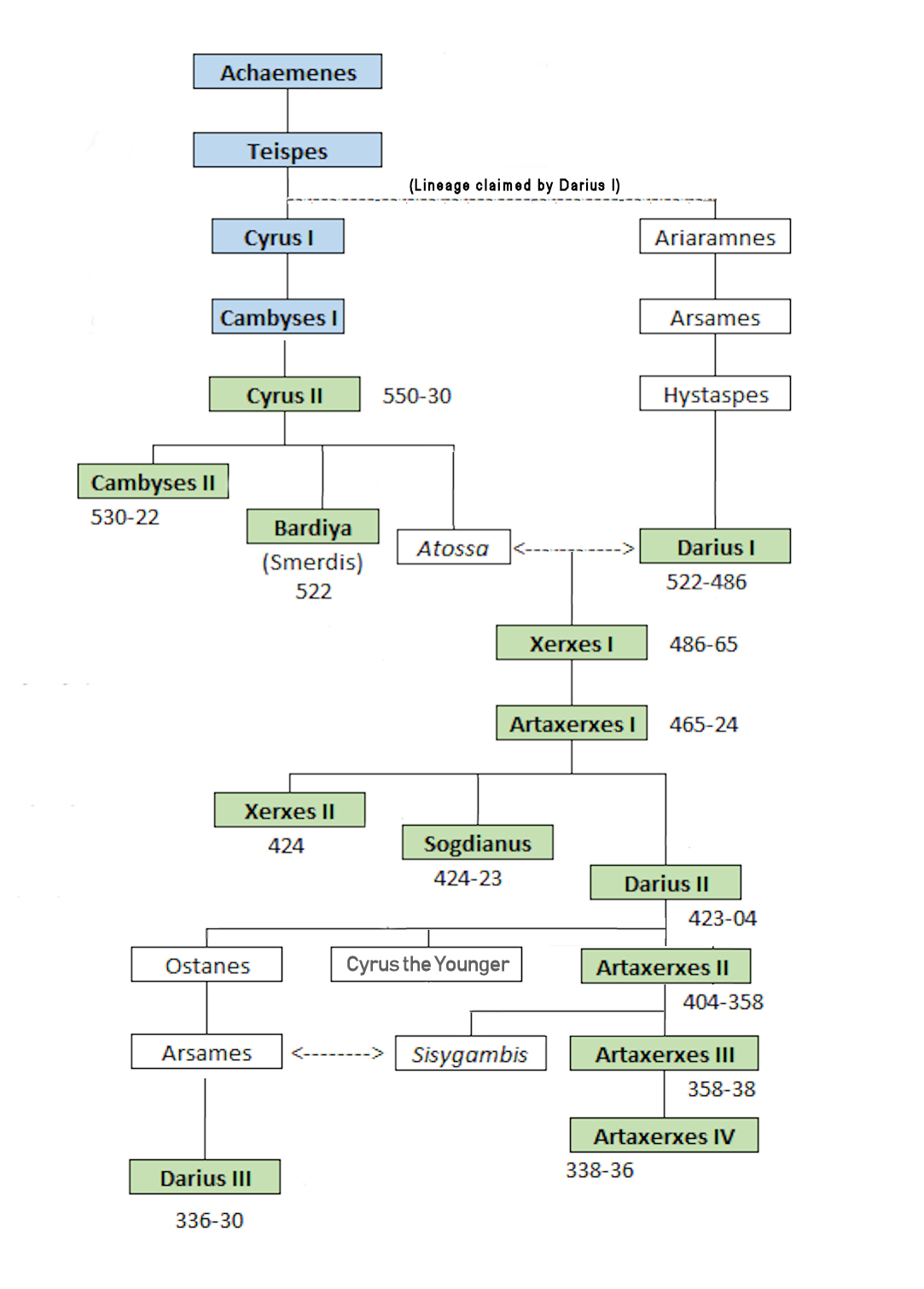
Pissuthnes was probably a grandson of Darius I.

He revolted against the Persian king Darius II Nothus between 420-415 BCE. He recruited Greek mercenaries under the generalship of Lycon for his campaigns. Tissaphernes, who was sent by the King to suppress the revolt of Pissuthnes, managed to bribe Lycon, and then brought Pissuthnes to Susa where he was executed. Tissaphernes became his successor as Satrap of Lydia.

Pissuthnes had a natural son named Amorges, who continued the rebellion against the Persian king.
