= Heraclitus of Cyme =

Heracleitus (Ancient Greek: Ἡράκλειτος) of Cyme, in Aeolis, was appointed by Arsinoe II, the wife of Lysimachus, to the government of Heraclea Pontica, when that city was given to her by her husband. By his arbitrary and tyrannical administration he inflicted a great injury on the prosperity of Heraclea, and alienated the minds of the citizens, so that after the death of Lysimachus in 281 BCE they rose in revolt against him, and, uniting with the mercenaries under his command, took Heracleitus prisoner, and re-established the liberty of their city. In the second passage where he is mentioned by the historian Memnon of Heraclea, his name is written "Heracleides": it is uncertain which is the correct form.
