= Eudamidas III =

King of Sparta from 241 to 228 BC

Eudamidas III (Ancient Greek: Εὐδαμίδας; reigned from 241 to 228 BC), son of Agis IV and Agiatis, daughter of Gylippus, was king of Sparta and a member of the Eurypontid dynasty. When his father was murdered he had just been born. Due to his minor age he never reigned and was succeeded by his uncle Archidamus V.

Preceded by Agis IV	Eurypontid King of Sparta; 241 BC – 228 BC	Succeeded by Archidamus V
