= Agis III =

King of Sparta from 338 to 331 BC

Agis III Ἄγις

King of Sparta
- Reign: 2 August 338 – 331 BC
- Predecessor: Archidamus III
- Successor: Eudamidas I
- Died: 331 BC (aged c. 29); Megalopolis
- Father: Archidamus III

Agis III (Greek: Ἄγις, died 331 BC) was the eldest son of Archidamus III, and the 21st Eurypontid king of Sparta between 338 and 331 BC. He tried to lead a revolt against Macedonian hegemony over Greece, but was defeated by Antipater—Alexander the Great's regent in Greece—at the Battle of Megalopolis in 331 BC, where he died.

== Life ==
Agis was the son of King Archidamus III (r. 360–338 BC) and the grandson of Agesilaus II (r. 400–360 BC), who belonged to the Eurypontid dynasty, one of the two royal families of Sparta (the other being the Agiads).

Following its defeat at Leuctra against Thebes in 371 BC, Sparta lost its great power status within the Greek world, as well as a number of territories. In 351 BC, Archidamus and Agis waged a war in the Peloponnese to recover these territories, notably against Megalopolis, a city established by the Thebans on its northwestern border in order to pose a permanent threat to Sparta. There were operations against Argos as well, which had received support from Theban troops. Despite the support of 3,000 mercenaries from Phocis, the campaign was fruitless.

At the beginning of 338 BC, Archidamus III left Greece to serve as a mercenary commander for Taras, a city founded by Sparta in Magna Graecia. Several states were at the time struggling for hegemony over Greece: the kingdom of Macedonia and the city-states led by Athens and Thebes. The fact that Archidamus left while the decisive battle was about to take place shows that he did not think that the Greeks had a chance to win. Archidamus III died fighting the Lucanians the same day as the Battle of Chaeronea, on 2 August 338 BC, when king Philip II decisively defeated Athens and Thebes. Agis, who had hitherto been regent in the absence of his father, became king once his death was known, probably at the end of August.

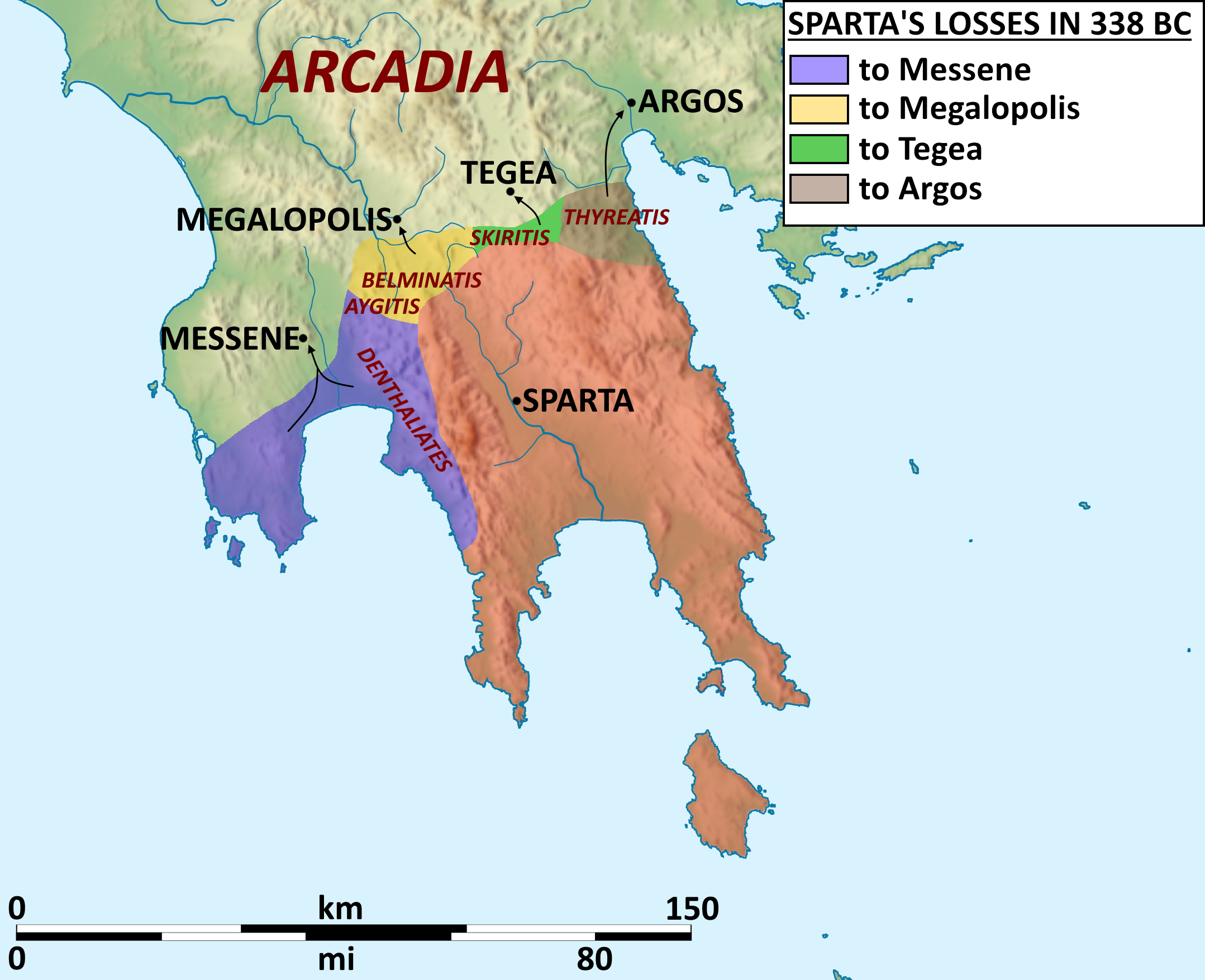
In 338 BC, Philip II gave some Spartan territories to Messene, Megalopolis, Tegea, and Argos.

After his victory at Chaeronea, Philip II founded the League of Corinth, a coalition of Macedonia and all the Greek city-states. Agis is likely behind the Spartan decision to reject joining the Corinthian League, which prompted Philip to campaign in Laconia in autumn 338 BC. Polybius tells that Philip was brought into the Peloponnese by the Messenians and the Arcadians, but the exact sequence of events is not known. Philip therefore gave several territories that belonged to Sparta to its neighbours and enemies: Denthaliates to Messene, Aygitis and Belminatis to Megalopolis, Skiritis to Tegea, and Thyreatis to Argos. It seems that he used a Panhellenic tribunal, perhaps the League of Corinth itself, to ratify his land transfers.

Because of the failure of Archidamus' campaign and the punitive operation of Philip, Agis III preferred to take the time for Sparta to recover its losses and wait for a good opportunity, rather than opposing Macedonia directly. Thus Sparta remained completely quiet for five years after Chaeronea. It did not join the revolt of Thebes against the new Macedonian king Alexander III in 335 BC. Agis' first move came in 333 BC, when the Persian king Darius III launched a counter-offensive after Alexander went into Asia in a bid to conquer Persia. He sent a Spartan named Euthycles to Darius' court in Susa. This man had connections in this city; he was a relative to—or perhaps the same man as—another envoy to the Persian king at Susa in 367 BC, also named Euthycles.

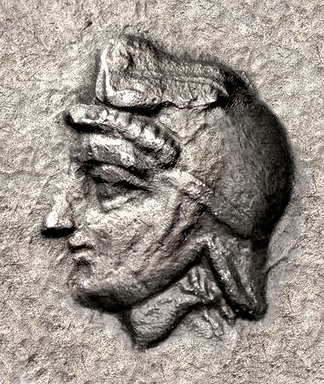
Agis III received the financial and military support of Autophradates, Achaemenid satrap of Lydia, against Alexander the Great.

In 333 BC, Agis went with a single trireme to the Persian commanders in the Aegean Sea, Pharnabazus III and Autophradates, to request money and armaments for carrying on hostile operations against Alexander the Great in Greece. The satraps agreed to support Agis; however, they could only spare for him 30 talents and 10 ships. The news of the Battle of Issus in 333 BC, however, put a check upon their plans. He sent his brother Agesilaus with instructions to sail with them to Crete, that he might secure that island for the Spartan interest. In this he seems in a great measure to have succeeded.

=== War against Macedon ===
Two years after this Spartan success (331 BC), the Greek states which were in league against Alexander seized the opportunity that had risen from the military disaster of the Macedonian general Zopyrion's campaign against the Scythians, combined with the Thracian revolt, to declare war against Macedonia. Agis was invested with the command and with his Spartan troops, and a body of 8,000 Greek mercenaries who had been present at the Battle of Issus, gained a decisive victory in the Peloponnese over a Macedonian army under Coragus.

Having been joined by the other forces of the league (Elis, Achaea and Arcadia), Agis laid siege to Megalopolis. The city held out until Antipater came to its relief. In the subsequent Battle of Megalopolis, Agis' army fought a larger Macedonian force, but was finally defeated, Agis himself died trying to gain his surviving men time to withdraw to safety.

On the manner of his death, Diodorus comments:

He had fought gloriously and fell with many frontal wounds. As he was being carried by his soldiers back to Sparta, he found himself surrounded by the enemy. Despairing of his own life, he ordered the rest to make their escape with all speed and to save themselves for the service of their country, but he himself armed and rising to his knees defended himself, killed some of the enemy and was himself slain by a javelin cast. He had reigned nine years.

Agis was succeeded by his brother Eudamidas I.

== Bibliography ==
- Ernst Badian, "Agis III", Hermes, Vol. 95 (1967), pp. 170–192.
- Paul Cartledge & Antony Spawforth, Hellenistic and Roman Sparta, A tale of two cities, London and New York, Routledge, 2002 (originally published in 1989). ISBN 0-415-26277-1
- Ioanna Kralli, The Hellenistic Peloponnese: Interstate Relations, A Narrative and Analytic History, from the Fourth Century to 146 BC, Swansea, The Classical Press of Wales, 2017. ISBN 978-1-910589-60-1
- D. J. Mosley, "Euthycles: One or Two Spartan Envoys?", The Classical Review, Vol. 22, No. 2 (Jun., 1972), pp. 167–169.
- Graham Shipley, "The Extent of Spartan Territory in the Late Classical and Hellenistic Periods", The Annual of the British School at Athens, Vol. 95 (2000), pp. 367–390.
- Françoise Ruzé & Jacqueline Christien, Sparte, Histoire, mythe, géographie, Malakoff, Armand Colin, 2017. ISBN 220061814X
- Stephen Ruzicka, "War in the Aegean, 333-331 B. C.: A Reconsideration", Vol. 42, No. 2 (Summer, 1988), pp. 131–151.

Preceded by Archidamus III	Eurypontid King of Sparta; 338–331 BC	Succeeded by Eudamidas I
