= Mazares =

Median general

Mazares (Median: Mazdara, Ancient Greek: Μαζάρης) was a Median general who defected to Cyrus the Great when the latter overthrew the Median king Astyages and formed the Persian Empire. Mazares is mentioned by Herodotus as a Median general in the service of Cyrus the Great who died while putting down a revolt in Asia Minor.

== Repression of the Lydian revolt ==
After Cyrus' conquest of Lydia in 539 BC, a Lydian official named Pactyas, whom Cyrus had honored by making him a treasury official in his own government, raised an army of Lydians and Ionian Greeks. He revolted against Tabalus, Cyrus' Satrap at Sardis in Lydia, besieging the Persian forces in the royal enclosure and stealing from the famed Lydian Hoard (the riches of King Crœsus) to finance his revolt.

Cyrus, upon hearing of the revolt, was enraged and made plans to punish the Lydians by burning Sardis to the ground. King Crœsus, who had been made an advisor to Cyrus' court after his defeat, entreated Cyrus to leave his former capital unharmed. According to Herodotus, Crœsus' recommendation was to disarm the population and enact trade laws that would turn the minds of the people to habits of luxury and pleasure:

"By doing this," Crœsus advised, "the people will, in a short time, become so enervated and so effeminate that you will have nothing to fear from them."

Cyrus, who was to become known for the mercy he showed to the peoples he conquered, agreed and sent his commander Mazares to put down the insurrection according to Crœsus' wishes, with instructions to return Pactyas alive for punishment. But Pactyas fled when Marzares' forces approached the city and found refuge in Ionian Greece.

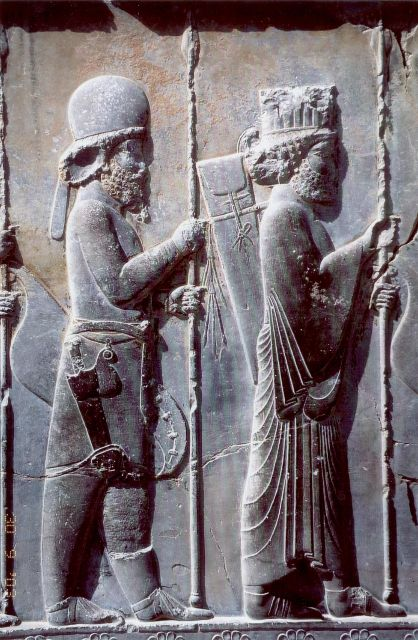
The Apadana Palace, northern stairway, 5th century BC Achaemenid bas-relief shows a Mede soldier behind a Persian soldier, in Persepolis, Iran

Mazares gave chase, conquering the Ionian Greek city-states of Priene and Magnesia, capturing Pactyas after several attempts and sending him back to Cyrus for punishment. Mazares then continued the conquest of Asia Minor, but died of unknown causes while on campaign:

Pactyes being then delivered up by the Chians, Mazares presently led his army against those who had helped to besiege Tabalus, and he enslaved the people of Priene, and overran the plain of the Maeandrus, giving it up to his army to pillage, and Magnesia likewise. Immediately after this he died of a sickness.

— Herodotus 1.161

== Succession ==
Cyrus then sent his leading general, Harpagus, to take his place. Harpagus completed Mazares' conquests of Asia Minor, Lycia, Cilicia and Phoenicia, using the hitherto unknown technique of building earthworks to breach the walls of besieged cities:

After his death Harpagus came down to succeed him in his command, a Median like Mazares; this is that Harpagus who was entertained by Astyages the Median king at that unnatural feast, and who helped win the kingship for Cyrus. When he came to Ionia, he took the cities by building mounds; he would drive the men within their walls and then build mounds against the walls and so take the cities.

— Herodotus 1.162
