= Lydia (satrapy) =

Province of the Achaemenid Empire (546-334 BC)

Lydia (satrapy)
𐎿𐎱𐎼𐎭, Sparda

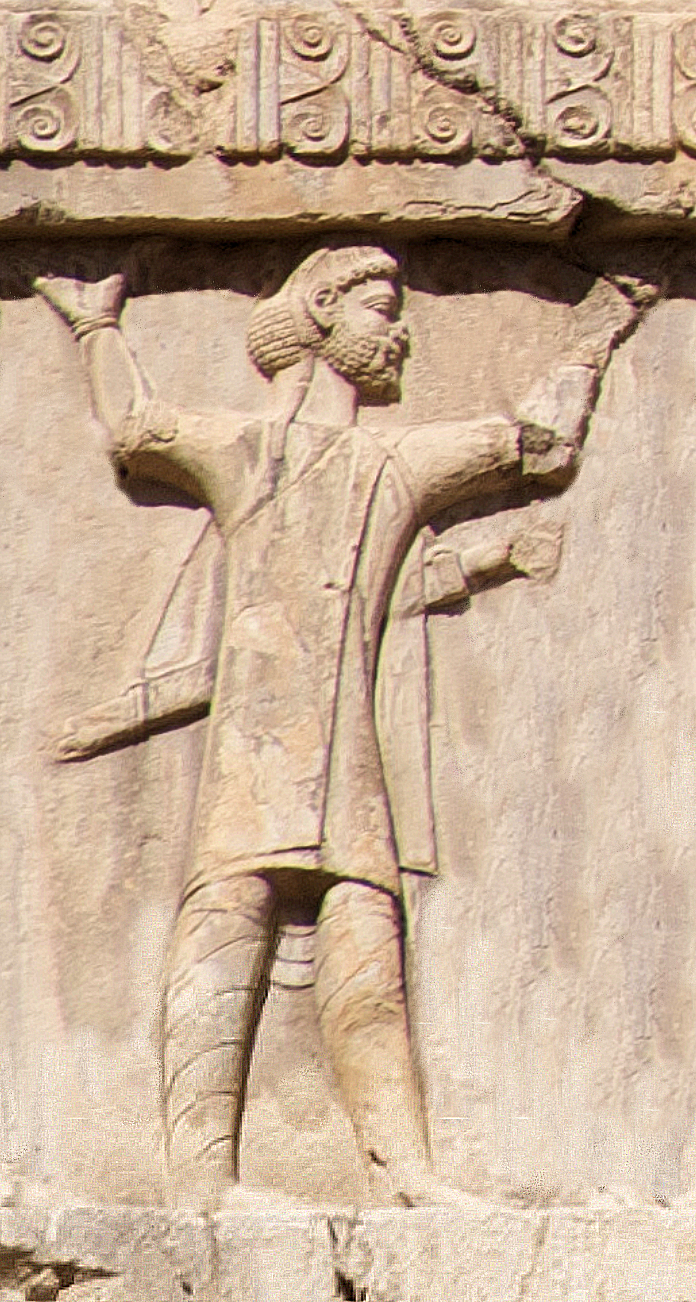
Lydian soldier of the Achaemenid army, c. 480 BC.. Xerxes I tomb relief.

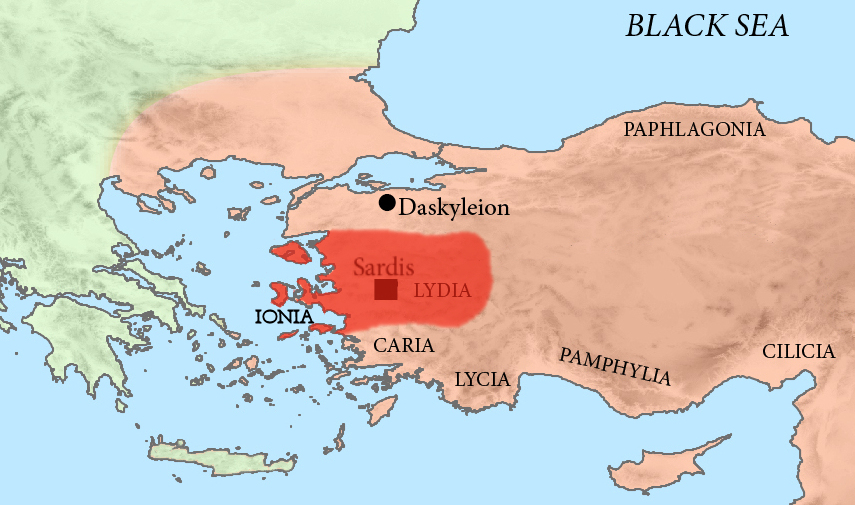
Lydia, including Ionia, during the Achaemenid Empire.

The Satrapy of Lydia, known as Sparda in Old Persian (Old Persian cuneiform 𐎿𐎱𐎼𐎭, Sparda), was an administrative province (satrapy) of the Achaemenid Empire, located in the ancient kingdom of Lydia, with Sardis as its capital.

== Achaemenid satrapy ==
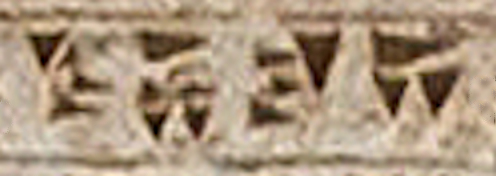
The name for Lydia as an Achaemenid territory in the DNa inscription of Darius the Great (c. 490 BC): Sparda (𐎿𐎱𐎼𐎭).

Tabalus, appointed by Cyrus the Great, was the first satrap; however, his rule did not last long as the Lydians revolted. The insurrection was suppressed by general Mazares and his successor Harpagus. After Cyrus' death, Oroetus was appointed as satrap. Oroetus ruled during the reign of Cambyses, and after the chaotic period that followed the Persian king's death, he conquered the Greek isle of Samos, killing its ruler Polycrates. Due to his growing power, Darius the Great had Bagaeus kill Oroetus. Bagaeus himself may have become satrap for a short period, but the next rulers were Otanes and Darius' younger brother, Artaphernes.

== Ionian revolt (499 BC) ==
During the Ionian revolt in 499 BC, Sardis was sacked by the Greeks. Five years later, the rebellion was suppressed and to the surprise of the Greek world, Artaphernes was very lenient in his treatment of the rebels.

After this period, many Persians settled in Lydia. The worship of eastern gods such as Anahita, as well as persified Lydian deities, began. Although members of the Persian aristocracy were given estates in the region following the Greek revolt, Greeks loyal to the Persian Empire were also given estates.

== Invasion of Greece (480-479 BC) ==
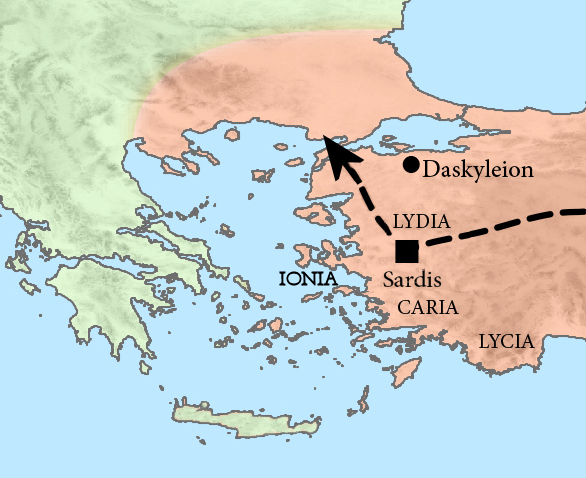
Xerxes stationed in Sardis with all his invasion force during the winter of 481-480 BC.

Artaphernes was succeeded as satrap in 492 BC by his son Artaphernes II. Lydians enrolled in the Achaemenid army, and participated to the Second Persian invasion of Greece (480–479 BC). Sardis was where all the troops of Xerxes stationed during the winter of 481-480 BC to prepare for the invasion of Greece.

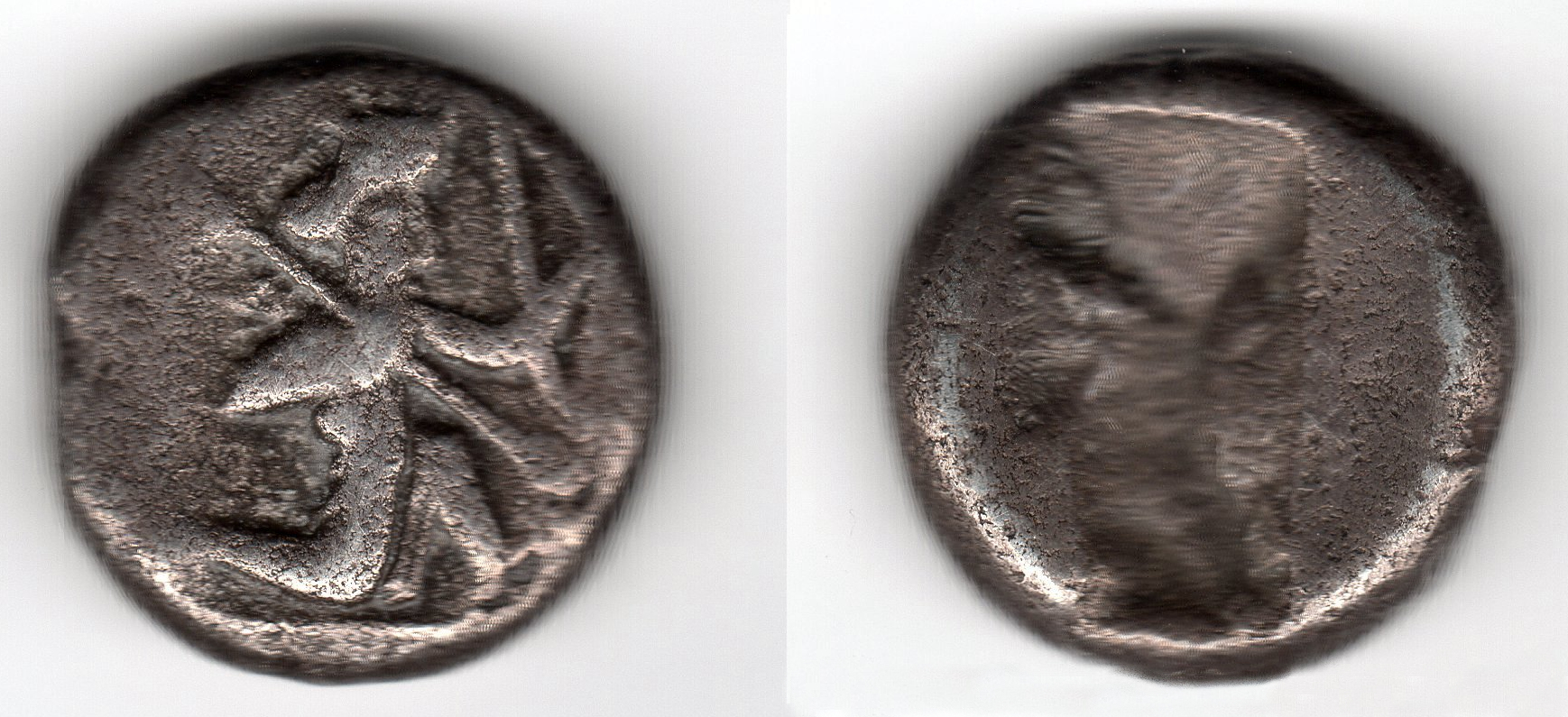
Achaemenid Era silver shekel made in Sardis between 500 and 450 BC showing a warrior-king holding a bow and a lance.

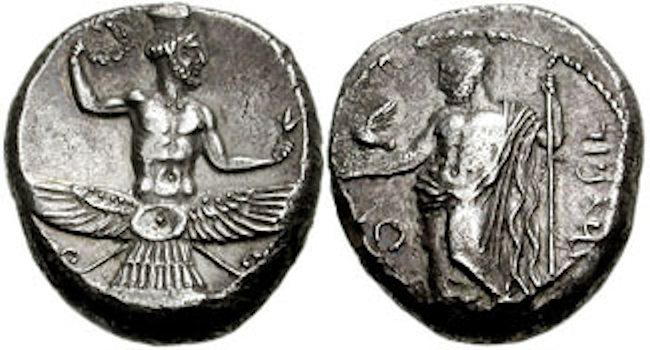
Coinage of Tiribazos, Satrap of Lydia, with Ahuramazda on the obverse. c. 388 — 380 BC.

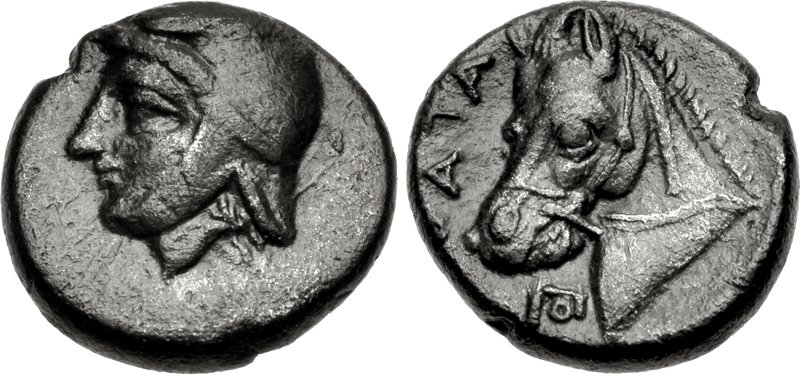
Coin of Autophradates, Achaemenid Satrap of Sparda (Lydia and Ionia), c. 380 — 350 BC.

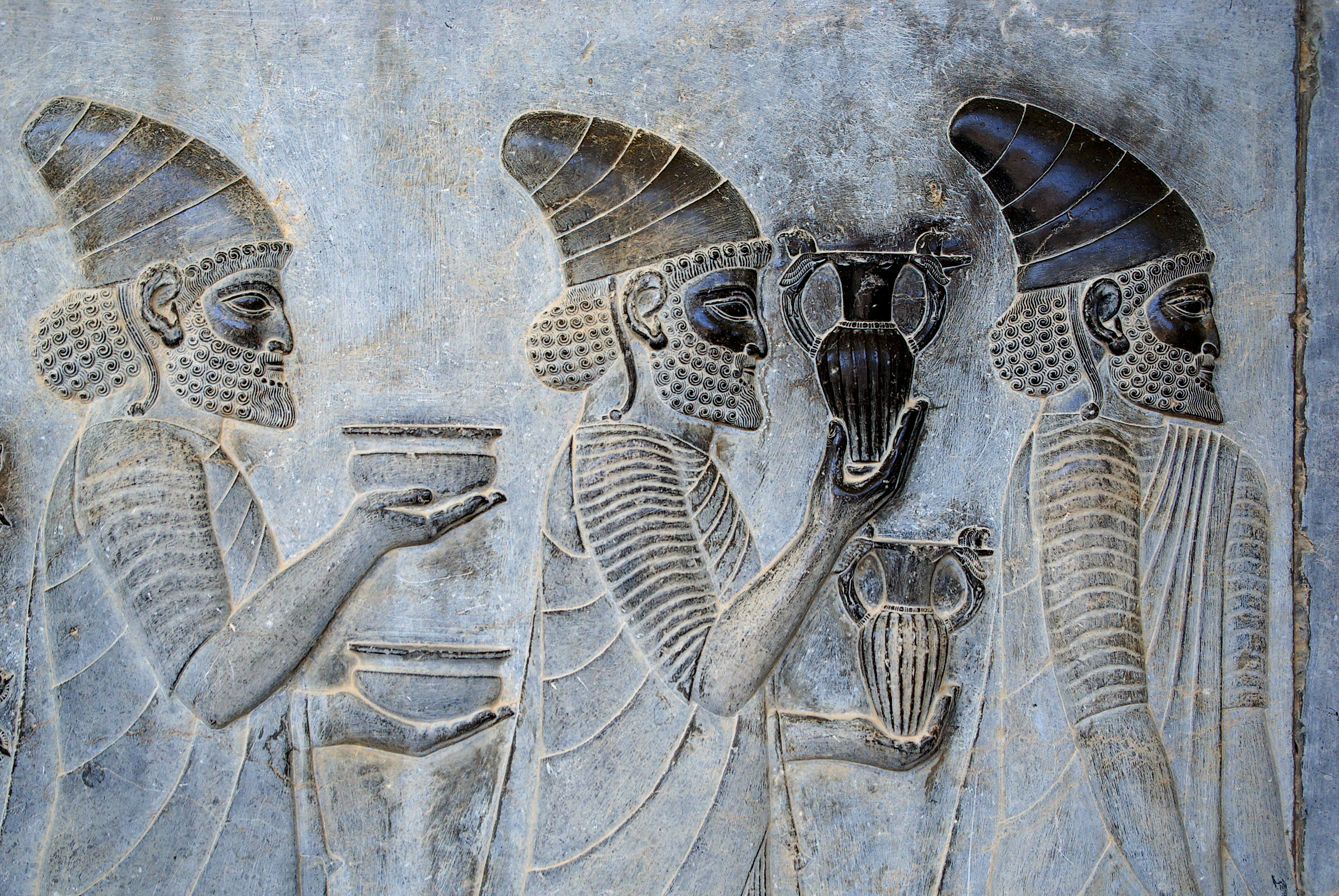
Lydian delegation at Apadana of Persepolis, c. 500 BC.

From the period of 480 BC to 440 BC, there is little historical information about the satrap of Lydia. In 440 BC, the satrap Pissuthnes attempted to retake Samos, which had rebelled against Athens, but failed. In 420 BC, Pissuthnes revolted against the Persian king Darius II. The Persian soldier and statesman Tissaphernes (Pers. Tiθrafarna, Gr. Τισσαφέρνης), a grandson of Hydarnes, was sent by Darius II to Lydia to arrest and execute Pissuthnes. Tissaphernes became satrap of Lydia in 415 BC and continued to fight Amorges, son of Pissuthnes.

After Sparta had defeated Athens, the Greeks invaded Lydia. Tissaphernes overcame the invasion of Thibron in 399 BC but was defeated at Sardis by the Spartan King Agesilaus II. The satrap was executed and replaced by Tiribazus, who restored order in Lydia and was responsible for a series of treaties between the Persian king and the Greek city states.

Autophradates was probably Tiribazus' direct successor, and was loyal to the Achaemenid monarch during a series of revolts in 370 BC. The last satrap of Lydia was Spithridates, who was killed by Alexander the Great at the battle of Granicus.

== Satraps ==
- Tabalus (c. 546–545 BC)
- Mazares (c. 545–544 BC)
- Harpagus (c. 544 BC)
- Oroetus (before c. 530–520 BC)
- Bagaeus (c. 520 BC)
- Otanes (c. 517 BC)
- Artaphernes I (c. 513–492 BC)
- Artaphernes II (492–after 480 BC)
- Pissuthnes (before c. 440–415 BC)
- Tissaphernes (c. 415–408 BC)
- Cyrus the Younger (c. 408–401 BC)
- Tissaphernes (c. 400–395 BC)
- Tiribazus (born c. 395 BC)
- Autophradates (c. 365 BC)
- Spithridates (died before c. 334 BC)

== See also ==
- Gökçeler relief
