= Archidamus III =

King of Sparta from 360 to 338 BC

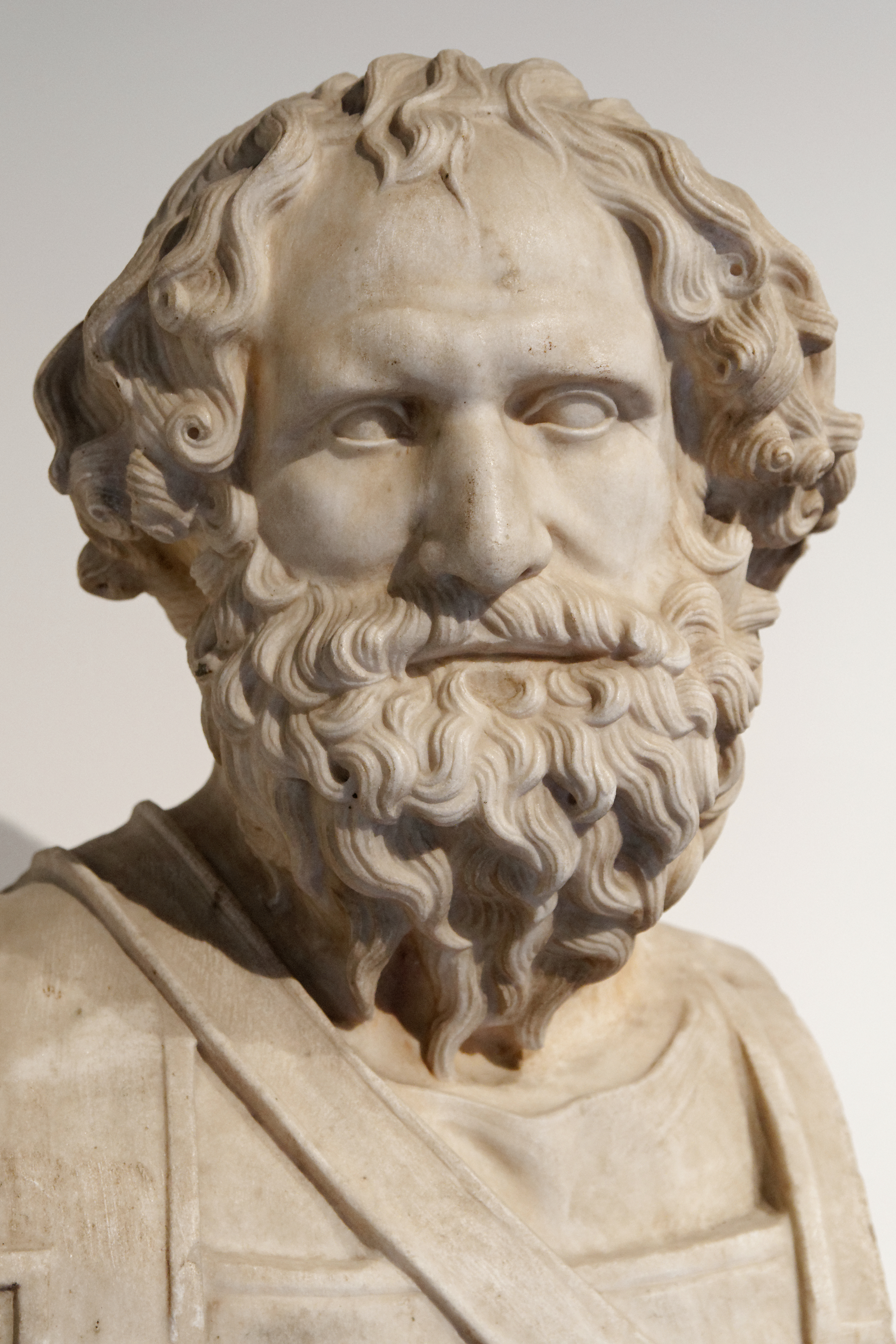
Bust of Archidamus III from the Villa of the Papyri in Herculaneum, now in the National Archaeological Museum, Naples

Archidamus III (died 338 BC) /ˌɑːrkɪˈdeɪməs/ (Ancient Greek: Ἀρχίδαμος Archídamos) was the son of Agesilaus II and king of Sparta from 360 to 338 BC.

== Biography ==
While still a prince, he was the eispnílas (εἰσπνήλας, inspirer, or pederastic lover) of Cleonymus, son of Sphodrias. He interceded with his own father to spare his aḯtas's (ἀΐτας, hearer, or pederastic beloved) father's life in a legal matter, an action which further intensified friction between Athens and Sparta. He later led the Spartan forces both before and during his rule. Archidamus headed the force sent to aid the Spartan army after its defeat by the Thebans at the Battle of Leuctra in 371 BC, and was commander later during the fighting in the Peloponnese. Four years later he captured Caryae, ravaged the territory of the Parrhasii and defeated the Arcadians, Argives and Messenians in the "tearless battle", so called because the victory did not cost the Spartans a single life. However, he was in turn defeated by the Arcadians in 364 BC at Cromnus.

In 362 BC, he showed great courage in the defense of Sparta against the Theban commander Epaminondas. As king, Archidamus supported the Phocians against Thebes in the Sacred War of 355–346. In 346 BC, he went to Crete to help Lyttos in their struggle against Knossos in the Foreign War. In 343 BC, the Spartan colony Tarentum asked for Sparta's help in the war against the Italic populations, notably the Lucanians and the Messapians. In 342 BC, Archidamus arrived in Italy with a fleet and a mercenary army and fought against the barbarians, but in 338 BC he was defeated and killed under the walls of the Messapian city of Manduria. He was succeeded by his son Agis III, and was also the father of Eudamidas I and another son named Agesilaus.

Preceded by Agesilaus II	Eurypontid King of Sparta; 360–338 BC	Succeeded by Agis III
