= Autophradates =

4th-century BC Persian satrap of Lydia

- Vadfradad
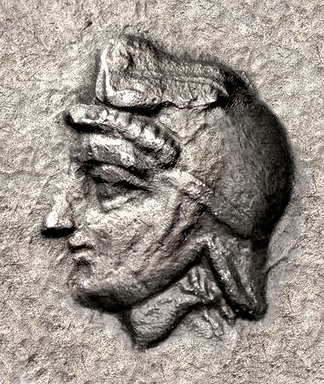
- Autophradates, from his coinage.

Satrap of Lydia
- Preceded by: Tiribazus
- Succeeded by: Spithridates

Personal details
- Born: 4th century BC
- Died: 4th century BC

Military service
- Allegiance: Achaemenid Empire
- Battles/wars: Great Satraps' Revolt; Wars of Alexander the Great

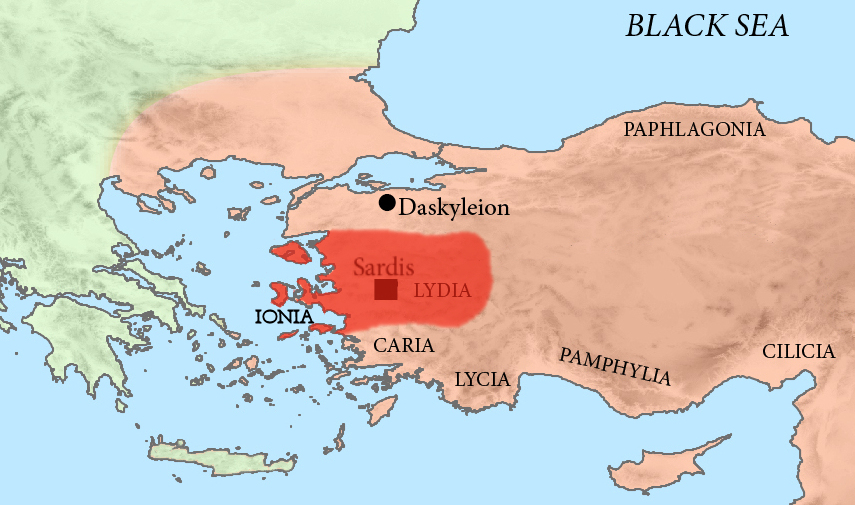
Autophradates was satrap of Lydia, including Ionia.

Autophradates (Old Persian: *Vātafradātah; Ancient Greek: Αὐτοφραδάτης, romanized: Autophradátēs, lived 4th century BC) was a Persian Satrap of Lydia, who also distinguished himself as a general in the reign of Artaxerxes III and Darius III.

== Rule as a satrap of Lydia ==
During the reign of the Artaxerxes II, Autophradates captured Artabazus, the satrap of Lydia and Ionia who had revolted against the Persian king, and made him his prisoner, but afterwards was forced to set him free.

Autophradates was also directed by Artaxerxes to put down the rebellion of the satrap of Cappadocia Datames. He went with a large army, but was obliged to retreat with heavy loss.

Autophradates later joined the Revolt of the Satraps.

=== Resistance to Alexander the Great ===
Autophradates participated to the Achaemenid resistance against the campaigns of Alexander the Great in Asia Minor. Together with Pharnabazus III he supported militarily and financial the king of Sparta Agis III who was organizing resistance against the Macedonians. After the death of the Persian admiral, Memnon, in 333 BC, Autophradates and Pharnabazus III, satrap of neighbouring Hellespontine Phrygia, undertook the command of the fleet, and reduced Mytilene, the siege of which had been begun by Memnon. Pharnabazus now sailed with his prisoners to Lycia, and Autophradates attacked the other islands in the Aegean Sea which supported Alexander the Great. But Pharnabazus soon after joined Autophradates again, and both sailed against Tenedos, which was induced by fear to surrender to the Persians.

== Tomb of Payava ==
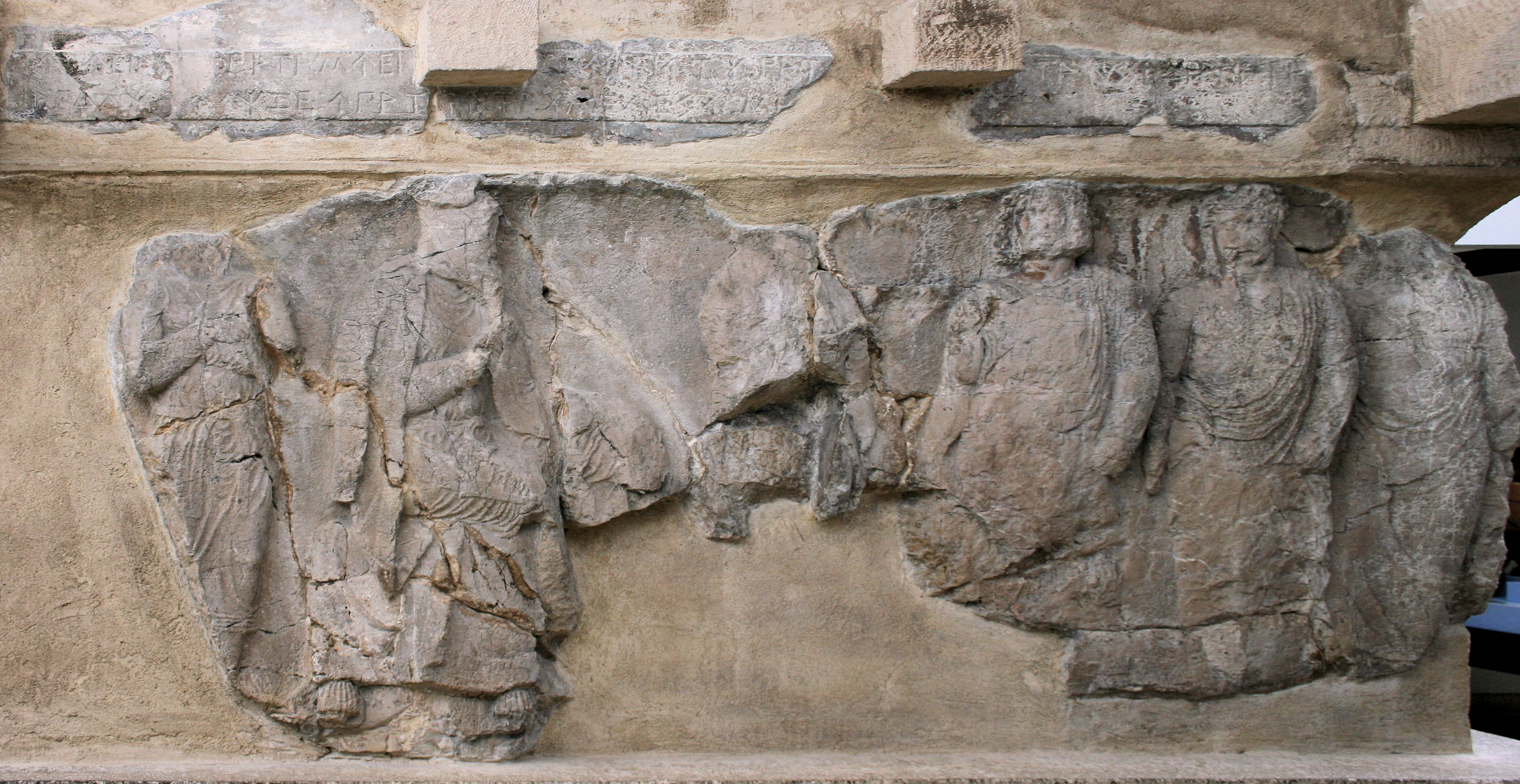
Achaemenid Satrap Autophradates with visitors, on the Tomb of Payava, circa 375 BCE. "Satrap Autophradates" is mentioned on the inscription on top of the frieze.

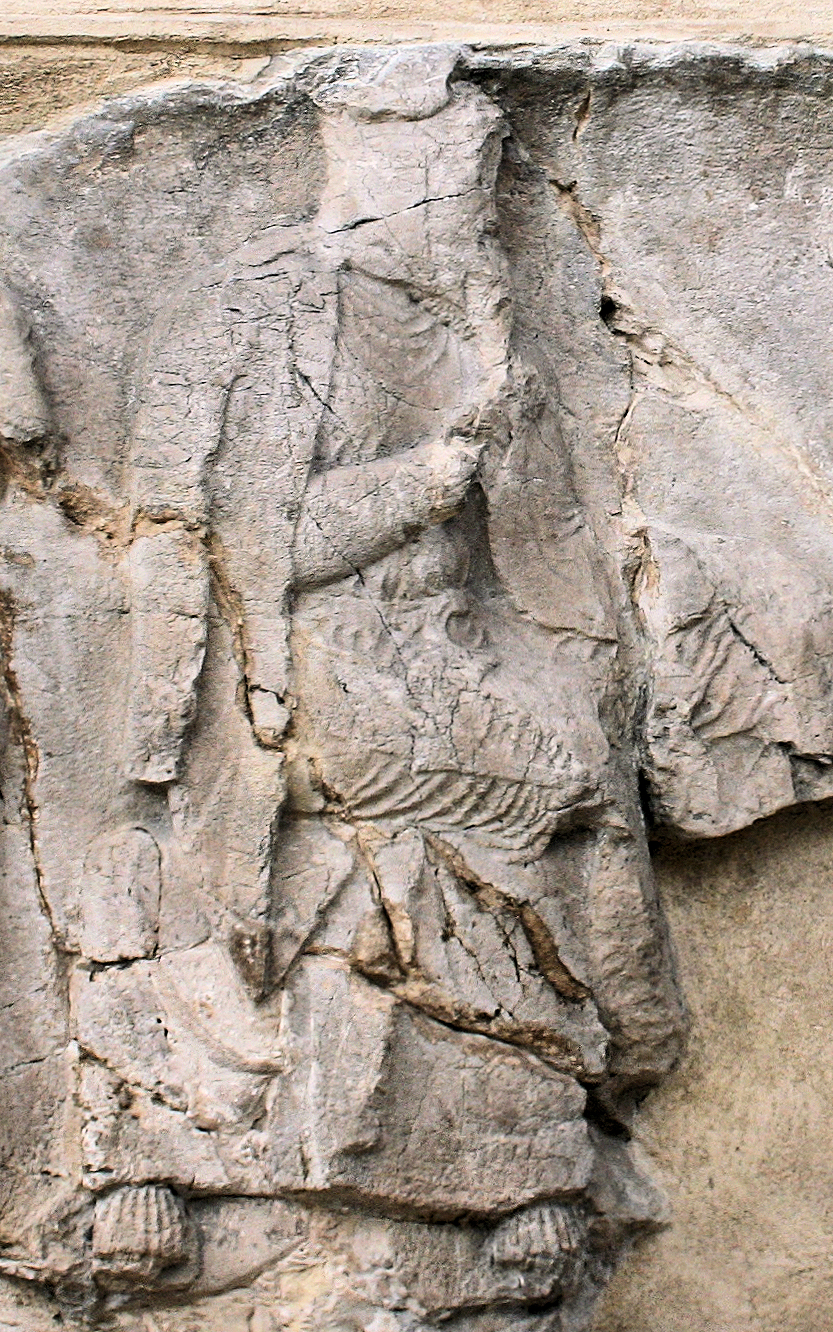
Satrap Autophradates sitting for an audience, on the Tomb of Payava, circa 375 BCE. "Satrap Autophradates" is mentioned on the inscription above the frieze.

Autophradates appears as a seated satrap in audience on the tomb of the Lycian dignitary Payava, now visible in the British Museum. Arthur Hamilton Smith in the British Museum catalogue describes the scene as follows:

"A Persian figure is seated to the right; he wears a long-sleeved tunic girt at the waist, a Persian cap and a mantle, and has a sheathed dagger by the right thigh, according to the Persian habit. He is seated on a stool covered with a cloth, and having legs with knobs of a common Persian form; his right hand is raised as if stroking his beard. On the left an attendant stands with his hands folded across his breast in Oriental manner; he wears a sleeved tunic girt at the waist. On the right are four standing figures turned towards the

Persian; a male figure, much mutilated, a bearded and long-haired figure similar to that on the short side, in tunic and himation; two younger male figures. Above is the Lycian inscription, which has been read:

dhdiya : [hryivata : mdiyd piydtq. : vat[apr]data : kssadrapa : pa[rzz\a : pddq, : tdlqzi; dpattd : trmmilisd : ma ....

It contains the name of "Autophradates, Persian Satrap", and may record the granting of an authorization for the tomb."

— Arthur Hamilton Smith in the British Museum catalogue.

== Coinage ==
The coinage of Autophradates shows the portrait of the satrap, and uses the legend "ΟΑΤΑ" in Greek script as an abbreviation for his name in Greek (ΟΑΤΑΦΡΑΔΑΤΗΣ).

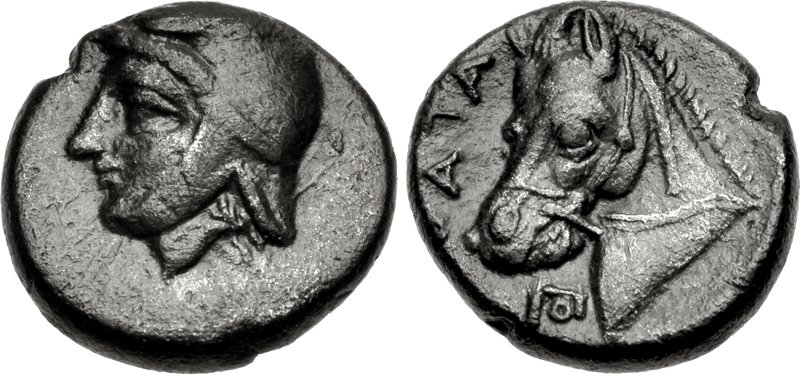
Coin of Autophradates. Satrap of Sparda (Lydia and Ionia), circa 380s-350s BCE.

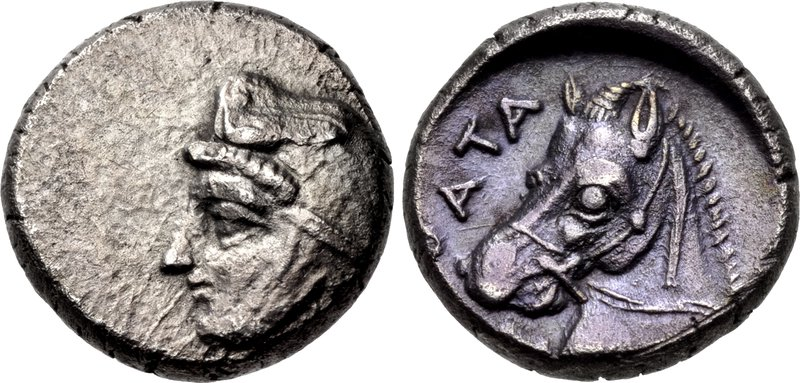
Coinage of Autophradates.

== See also ==
- List of satraps of Lydia
