= Tabalus =

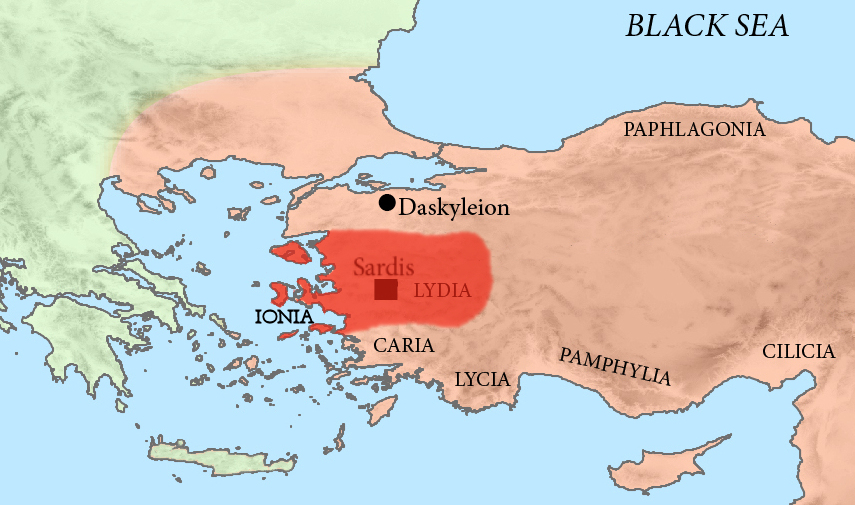
Tabalus was the first satrap of Lydia, with his capital in Sardis.

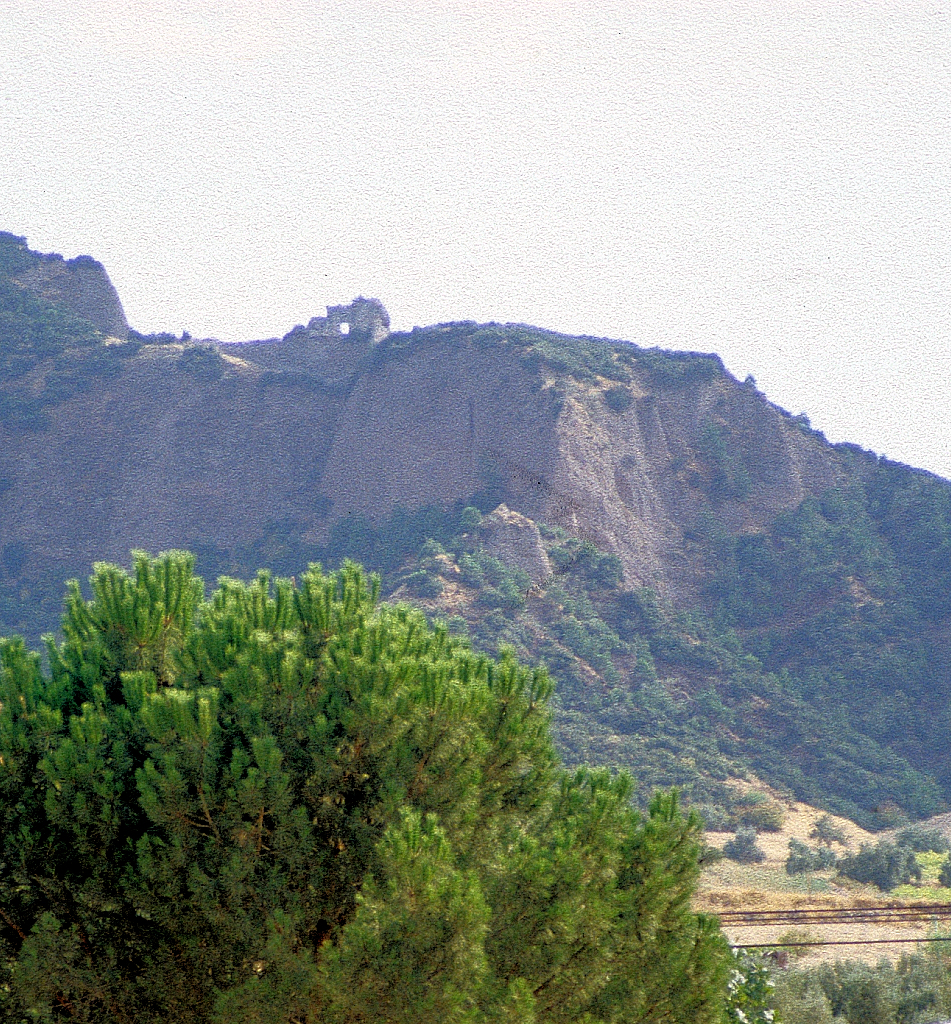
Remains of the acropolis of Sardis where Tabalus took refuge from the Lydian revolt.

Tabalus the Persian ,Greek: Τάβαλος, was the first Persian satrap of Sardis. Cyrus the Great of Persia put him in place after conquering Lydia and annexing it into the Persian Empire in 546 BC. Herodotus mentions him in his histories (Hdt 1. 153-4):

Presently, entrusting Sardis to a Persian called Tabalus, and charging Pactyes, a Lydian, to take charge of the gold of Croesus and the Lydians, he (Cyrus the Great) himself marched away to Agbatana, taking with him Croesus, and at first making no account of the Ionians. For he had Babylon on his hands and the Bactrian nation and the Sacae and Egyptians; he was minded to lead an army himself against these and to send another commander against the Ionians.

— Herodotus 1.153

This was the same Tabalus whom Pactyes the Lydian trapped in the acropolis when he revolted and marched upon Sardis later that year:

But no sooner had Cyrus marched away from Sardis than Pactyes made the Lydians to revolt from Tabalus and Cyrus; and he went down to the sea, where, as he had all the gold of Sardis, he hired soldiers and persuaded the men of the coast to join his army. Then marching to Sardis he penned Tabalus in the citadel and besieged him there.

— Herodotus 1.154
