= Eudamidas I =

Eurypontid king of Sparta from 331 to c.300 BC

Eudamidas I (Greek: Εὐδαμίδας) was Spartan king between 331 and c. 300 BC. He succeeded his brother Agis III, who died at the battle of Megalopolis against Macedonia. Eudamidas' reign was therefore peaceful as Sparta recovered from this disaster. He even refused to join the other Greek states in the Lamian War in 323, and was later noted for his interest in philosophy—peculiar for a Spartan king.

== Life and reign ==
Eudamidas was the son of king Archidamus III (r. 360–338) and grandson of Agesilaus II (r. 400–360) who belonged to the Eurypontid dynasty, one of the two royal families of Sparta (the other being the Agiads). His mother was Deinicha, probably the daughter of Eudamidas, himself brother of Phoebidas, a Spartan commander who captured the acropolis of Thebes in 382. As Phoebidas was a friend of Agesilaus II, the king had arranged the marriage of his son Archidamus with his friend's niece, which explains how the name Eudamidas entered the catalogue of names of the Eurypontids.

Archidamus had two other sons beside Eudamidas; the eldest was king Agis III (r. 338–331) and the third one was Agesilaus. Considering the prestige of the latter's name, it has been suggested that he was the second son and Eudamidas the youngest. It would therefore means that Agesilaus died in 331 together with Agis III at the Battle of Megalopolis, which prompted Eudamidas' accession to the throne.

Eudamidas' reign was peaceful and uneventful. In 323, he notably refused to join other Greek states in their revolt against Macedonia, which dominated Greece since the Battle of Chaeronea in 338, but was shaken by the death of Alexander the Great. Sparta at the time was still recovering from its disastrous defeat at Megalopolis in 331, after which Macedonia additionally kept 50 Spartan hostages. Moreover, the Greek coalition was led by Athens, which had refused to join Agis III in 331, and counted Sparta's bitter enemies Argos and Messene. During his reign, perhaps at the occasion of the raid of Cassander (the Macedonian regent) to Messenia in 317, Sparta built its first city-wall, while it had hitherto relied on its military might to fend-off enemies. Although the wall was merely a palisade, it shows that Sparta's power had seriously waned at the end of the fourth century. Eudamidas might nevertheless have passively resisted against Macedonia, as in 314 he let Antigonos Monophtalmos recruit mercenaries at Tenarion (within Spartan territory) in order to wage war against Cassander.

Eudamidas visited Athens when Xenocrates was the head of the Academy (between 339 and 314). The reason of his visit was probably diplomacy, but Plutarch reports that Eudamidas actually discussed philosophy with Xenocrates there, a stark contrast from the military role hitherto assumed by the Spartan kings.

Eudamidas' date of death is not known. He was presumably still alive in 302, because Diodorus of Sicily does not mention his death in his list of royal deaths for this year. As his book is fragmentary after this date, Eudamidas' death must have been mentioned in one of the text's subsequent lacunae. He was certainly dead by 294, when his son Archidamus IV is mentioned as king. Scholars usually place his death between c.302 and c.300.

== Bibliography ==
=== Ancient sources ===
- Diodorus Siculus, Bibliotheca Historica.
- Plutarch, Moralia.

=== Modern sources ===
- Paul Cartledge, Sparta and Lakonia, A Regional History 1300–362 BC, London, Routledge, 2001 (originally published in 1979). ISBN 0-415-26276-3
- ——, Agesilaos and the Crisis of Sparta, Baltimore, Johns Hopkins University Press, 1987. ISBN 978-0-7156-3032-7
- George L. Cawkwell, "Agesilaus and Sparta", The Classical Quarterly 26 (1976), pp. 62–84.
- Paul Cloché, "La politique extérieure de Lacédémone depuis la mort d'Agis III jusqu'à celle d'Acrotatos, fils d'Areus Ier", Revue des Études Anciennes, 1945 47 n°3-4, pp. 219–242.
- Ephraim David, Sparta between Empire and Revolution (404-243 B.C.), Internal Problems and Their Impact on Contemporary Greek Consciousness, New York, 1981.
- Ioanna Kralli, The Hellenistic Peloponnese: Interstate Relations, A Narrative and Analytic History, from the Fourth Century to 146 BC, Swansea, The Classical Press of Wales, 2017. ISBN 978-1-910589-60-1
- E. I. McQueen, "Some Notes on the Anti-Macedonian Movement in the Peloponnese in 331 B.C.", Historia: Zeitschrift für Alte Geschichte, Bd. 27, H. 1 (1st Qtr., 1978), pp. 40–64.
- ——, "The Eurypontid House in Hellenistic Sparta", Historia: Zeitschrift für Alte Geschichte, Bd. 39, H. 2 (1990), pp. 163–181.
- Graham J. Shipley, The Early Hellenistic Peloponnese: Politics, Economies, and Networks 338-197 BC, Cambridge University Press, 2018. ISBN 978-0-521-87369-7
- C. G. Thomas, "On the Role of the Spartan Kings", Historia: Zeitschrift für Alte Geschichte, Bd. 23, H. 3 (3rd Qtr.,1974), pp. 257–270.

Preceded by Agis III	Eurypontid King of Sparta; 331 BC – c. 300 BC	Succeeded by Archidamus IV
