= Siege of Sparta =

Failed Epirote siege of Sparta

- Part of Pyrrhus' invasion of the Peloponnese
- The Siege of Sparta by Pyrrhus; François Topino-Lebrun
Date	Spring 272 BC
Location	Sparta 37°04′55″N 22°25′25″E
Result	Spartan–Antigonid victory

Belligerents
Epirus	Sparta; Antigonid Macedon

Commanders and leaders
Pyrrhus; Ptolemy †	Areus I Acrotatus II; Ameinias the Phocian

Strength
27,000 men, 24 elephants	2,000 Spartan Youths, Periokoi, and Helots; 6,000–7,000 Spartan women

The siege of Sparta took place in 272 BC and was a battle fought between Epirus, led by King Pyrrhus, (r. 297–272 BC) and an alliance consisting of Sparta, under the command of King Areus I (r. 309–265 BC) and his heir Acrotatus, and Antigonus Gonatas. The battle was fought at Sparta and ended in a Spartan-Antigonid victory.

Following his defeat in Italy by the Roman Republic, Pyrrhus was forced to retreat back to Epirus. On his return to Epirus, he declared war against Antigonus Gonatas (r. 283–239 BC), managing to take control of Macedon except for some coastal parts. In 272 BC, he was approached by a Spartan prince, Cleonymus, a claimant to the Spartan throne who had been overlooked. Pyrrhus saw this invitation as an opportunity to extend his wars of conquest to the Peloponnese and invaded Sparta. Despite the majority of the Spartan army campaigning in Crete, the remaining Spartans were able to mount a defence led by the Spartan Crown Prince Acrotatus. The Spartans were able to withstand the Epirote assaults until the arrival of the main Spartan army, led by King Areus I, and Antigonid reinforcements, prompting Pyrrhus to abandon the siege.

After this failure, Pyrrhus ravaged the Spartan hinterland whilst fending off counter-attacks by the victorious Spartans. On the invitation of an Argive ally, Pyrrhus attempted to seize Argos. The assault culminated in a fiasco with Pyrrhus being attacked by his Argive opponents, the pursuing Spartan army of Areus and a Macedonian army commanded by Antigonus Gonatas. Pyrrhus was killed in the ensuing battle in the streets of Argos, ending Epirote hopes of establishing a hegemony in Greece.

== Background ==
Map depicting the campaigns of Pyrrhus in southern Italy and Sicily and the location of Epirus in Greece

In 281 BC, at the request of the Greek city of Tarentum, Pyrrhus, the King of the Greek state of Epirus, began the Pyrrhic War taking an army of 25,500 men and 20 elephants to Italy to help fight the Romans. The Romans had succeeded in conquering most of Italy and were now moving in to take the Greek cities in Magna Graecia. After arriving in Italy in 280 BC, Pyrrhus defeated a Roman army at the Battle of Heraclea, near Tarentum. Pyrrhus repeated his success against the Romans by defeating another army at the Battle of Asculum.

These victories proved to be very costly to Pyrrhus and he diverted his attention to Sicily, where the Greek states on the island were appealing for his help against Carthage. Despite defeating the Carthaginians and occupying most of the island, Pyrrhus' behaviour alienated him from his Greek allies and he was forced to abandon Sicily and return to the Italian mainland. Pyrrhus attacked the rebuilt Roman army and after the inconclusive Battle of Beneventum, Pyrrhus returned to Epirus after leaving a garrison at Tarentum.

The war in Italy had drained Pyrrhus' financial and military resources. To increase his resources and bolster his standing, he declared war on King Antigonus II Gonatas of Macedon. He ravaged part of the country before managing to defeat Antigonus at the Battle of the Aous. This defeat compelled Antigonus to flee to Thessaloniki, where he was protected by his strong navy. Following Antigonus' flight, Pyrrhus was able to gain control of most of Macedon and Thessaly, declaring himself King of Macedon.

== Prelude ==
Upon his seizure of the Macedonian throne, Pyrrhus was approached by a Spartan Prince, Cleonymus who was serving as an officer in his army. The Spartan persuaded Pyrrhus to assist him in his plot to capture Sparta. Cleonymus' motives in wanting to attack Sparta were twofold. Firstly, he bore a grudge because his countrymen had overlooked him in favour of his nephew, Areus I when determining the successor of the Agiad throne. Plutarch, the Greek historian, attributed Cleonymus' non-selection as king to his violent disposition and arbitrariness. Moreover, Cleonymus had been slighted because his new wife, Chilonis, had been seduced by Areus' son, Arcotatus. These perceived insults spurred Cleonymus to leave Sparta and scheme to usurp the throne.

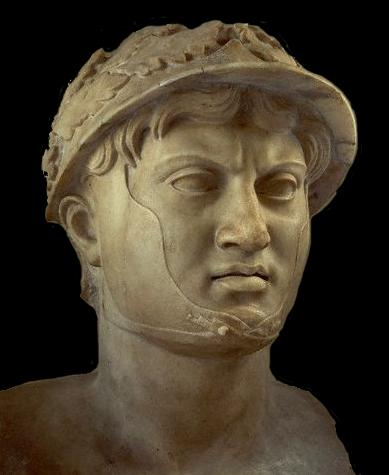
A bust of Pyrrhus, King of Epirus, at the National Archaeological Museum of Naples

Pyrrhus was receptive to Cleonymus' appeals to install him on the Spartan throne and agreed to assist him. To achieve this, the Epiriote King assembled an army of 27,000 men. It consisted of 25,000 infantry, 2,000 cavalry and was supplemented by 24 war elephants. The size of Pyrrhus' expedition indicates that he viewed aiding Cleonymus as an opportunity to extend his hegemony into the Peloponnese and secure Sparta as an ally. An alternate theory is that Pyrrhus undertook his invasion of the Peloponnese as a means of cutting off any support that Antigonus was still receiving from the southern Greek poleis. After mustering his force, Pyrrhus marched south through central Greece and through to the Peloponnese. N. G. L. Hammond speculates that Pyrrhus' army marched down to Pleuron on the Aetolian side of the Gulf of Corinth and crossed from there into the Peloponnese. This suggests that the invasion was facilitated by the Aetolian League, a power confederate in Central Greece, which was hostile to Antigonus.

Upon his arrival in the Peloponnese, Pyrrhus was welcomed in Achaia before continuing his march to Megalopolis. There he was met by Spartan ambassadors as well as those from Messene, Athens and the Achaean League. Pyrrhus appears to have received support for his invasion from some of Sparta's neighbours, namely Elis, Megalopolis and some Achaian cities which would profit from reduced Spartan power. In response to the Spartan emissaries' inquiries as to his intentions, the Epiriote King managed to deceive them. Pyrrhus asserted that his aim in invading the Peloponnese was to liberate the cities still held by Antigonus and to send his sons to Sparta to be educated in the agoge. After the withdrawal of the ambassadors, the Epiriote army advanced into Laconia, followed the Eurotas River south and started ravaging the territory of the Spartan perioeci. Pyrrhus' deceit prompted outrage in Sparta and the ambassadors were again dispatched to the Epiriote to upbraid him for his perfidy.

== Battle ==
=== First day ===
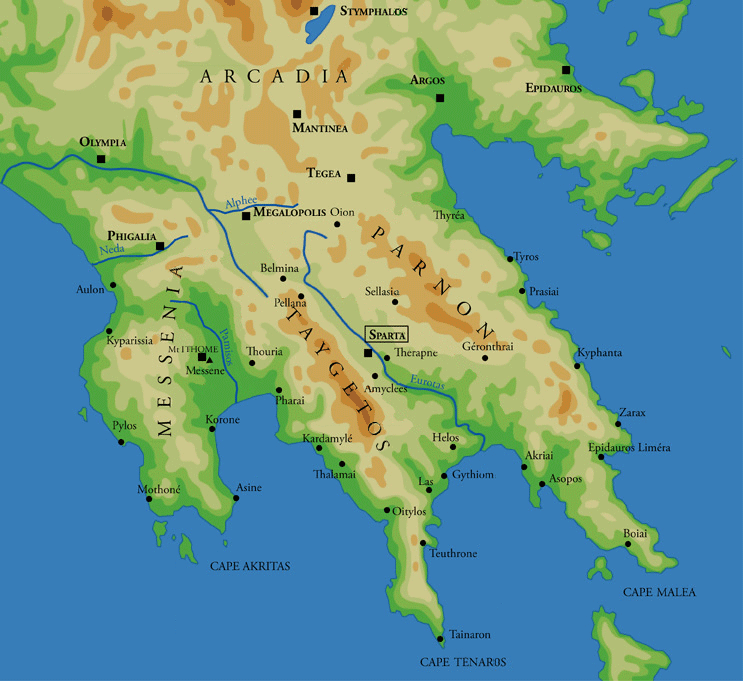
A map of the southern and central Peloponnese (the southernmost area of Greece) showing important cities

At the time of the invading army's entry into Laconia, Sparta was only lightly defended. The majority of the Spartan army had accompanied Areus on campaign in Crete, where the Lacedaimonians were supporting the polis of Gortyn. As such, Sparta must have seemed like an easy target to Pyrrhus. Arriving outside Sparta in the evening, Cleonymus advised Pyrrhus to attack immediately to take advantage of the dearth of defenders. Pyrrhus decided against launching an immediate offensive as he feared the destruction that would be wrought by his Gallic soldiers if they were to enter the city at night. Anticipating no resistance, Pyrrhus ordered his army to make camp and prepared to enter Sparta in the morning.

The appearance of the Epirote army before their city caught the Spartans unprepared. Despite the Lacedaimonian gerousia being in favour of sending the women to Crete for their protection, this was opposed by Arachidamia, the former queen and grandmother of the Eurypontid King Eudamidas II, who ensured that the Spartan women would remain to assist with the protection of the city. After the arrangements for the women were reached, the Spartans began bolstering the settlement's defences. The defenders were aware that the Epiriotes had brought elephants and to counteract them, the older men and women dug a trench parallel to Pyrrhus' camp with wagons sunken into the ground at the flanks to hinder the enemy's advance. The trench was a formidable obstacle, spanning 800 feet in length with a depth of six feet and a width of nine feet. Pausanias recounts that the meagre Spartan garrison was assisted during the siege by allies who had arrived from Argos and Messene. Additionally, the Spartans sent messengers to both Areus summoning him back to Sparta and to Antigonus, seeking assistance from him despite the fact that Sparta and Macedon had historically been enemies.

When daybreak approached and the Epiriote army was preparing its attack, the Spartans assumed defensive positions behind their trench. They were encouraged by the women who had remained and by the sight of Chilonis, who had placed a halter around her neck, declared that she would commit suicide rather than return to Cleonymus if Pyrrhus captured the city. The besiegers, led by Pyrrhus in person, attempted to storm the Spartan defences but were repulsed as they were unable to secure firm footing in the face of Spartan attacks, rendering the trench impassable.

Seeking to circumvent this obstacle, Pyrrhus sent a force of 2,000 Gauls and some picked Chaonians under the commander of his son Ptolemy to go around the trench. These troops found their path blocked by the wagons which the Lacedaimonians had sunken into the soil. The wagons were planted so deeply that they hindered not only the Epiriote assault but also Spartan efforts to repel the foray. Eventually the Gauls managed to remove some of the wagons, giving them the opportunity to burst into the city. Acrotatus, seeing the danger, exploited a series of depressions in the terrain to lead a force of 300 men undetected against the Epiriote rear. This manoeuvre evoked panic amongst the Gauls who were compelled to abandon their attempt to enter the city and had to turn around to confront the attack to their rear. After a hard-fought battle, the Epiriote flanking group was pushed back into the trench with heavy casualties inflicted upon them. The Spartans, elated by Arcotatus' leadership, told him to withdraw from the battle and return to Chilonis so as to beget more children like him for Sparta.

=== Second day ===
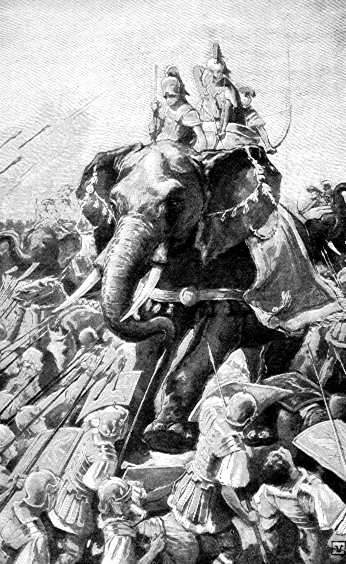
A depiction of Pyrrhus and his war elephants. He brought 24 elephants with him to besiege Sparta.

Pyrrhus failed to breach the Lacedaimonian defences and when night fell, he withdrew back to his camp. According to Plutarch, Pyrrhus received an omen during the night. As he slept, he dreamt of Sparta being smitten and set alight by thunderbolts coming from his own hand. While Pyrrhus and most of his counsellors interpreted the dream as indicating that they would seize Sparta by storm, his friend Lysimachus warned him that places struck by thunderbolts were usually avoided and that Pyrrhus was destined not to enter Sparta. Pyrrhus dismissed this interpretation and buoyed by what he deemed to be a portentous sign, he prepared his men for a further assault.

In the face of the renewed Epiriote offensive, the Spartans held their defences with vigour. Due to the lack of manpower, the Spartan women were active in offering missiles to the defenders as well as taking away the wounded and providing food and drink to those who required it. To nullify the advantage of the Spartans' position, the Epiriotes began filling up the trench with materials which they were bringing to the front line as well as the bodies of their slain comrades. The efforts of the besiegers were hindered by the Spartans who were aware of the importance of maintaining their defensive obstacles.

In response to the Spartan counter-attack against the Epiriotes filling the trench, Pyrrhus decided to personally lead a charge against the Spartan lines. Mounted on his horse, the Epiriote King was able to force his way through the trench, over the wagons and into the city with a group of his companions. The sudden onslaught of Pyrrhus sparked panic amongst the defenders of this section. At this point Pyrrhus' horse was wounded by a javelin which pierced its belly causing it to throw the King to the ground. The fall of the King threw his companions into a state of confusion and enabled the Spartans to rally. The Spartans launched a barrage of missiles at the King's comrades, felling many of them. Despite the deaths of many of his guards, Pyrrhus was successfully taken to the safety of the main Epiriote lines.

=== Fighting retreat ===
Following this unsuccessful foray, Pyrrhus ordered his army to fall back. He hoped that the Spartans would now be willing to come to terms due to the heavy casualties they had suffered. Pyrrhus' hopes of a Spartan capitulation were thwarted by the arrival of reinforcements. Upon hearing of Pyrrhus' intention to conquer Sparta, Antigonus Gonatas had dispatched his general, Ameinias the Phocian, from Corinth with a group of mercenaries to relieve the Lacedaimonians. Shortly after this, the defenders' numbers were further augmented by the arrival of Areus with 2,000 men from Crete. The arrival of these reinforcements greatly reduced the strain on the Spartans, with women and those who were not of military age being able to withdraw from the front line.

Bolstered by the fresh troops, the Spartans and their Macedonian allies prepared themselves for Pyrrhus' next assault against the trench. The presence of more adversaries intensified Pyrrhus' determination to capture the city and he ordered another attack on the trenches. He was unable to accomplish anything and suffered further losses. The failure of this attack convinced Pyrrhus about the futility of persevering with the siege and he decided to lift it and withdraw.

Pyrrhus intended to spend the winter in Laconia, possibly with the purpose of launching a fresh attack on Sparta and sent his army to begin ravaging the surrounding countryside. At this point, Pyrrhus received an emissary from Aristeas, a prominent citizen of the major Peloponnesian polis of Argos, seeking his assistance to overthrow the regime of Aristippus, which was supportive of Antigonus and the Macedonians. Pyrrhus hastened to seize the opportunity to capture Argos and began to withdraw from Laconia, heading north to Argolis.

His retreating army was continuously harried by the Spartans under the command of Areus. By setting ambushes and occupying important positions along the Epiriote line of retreat, the Spartans were able to inflict significant casualties on Pyrrhus' rearguard of Gauls and Molossians. In an attempt to counter the panic and crumbling morale of his rear which was engaging the Spartans, Pyrrhus sent his son Ptolemy to take command. By doing this, Pyrrhus' hope was that his son's presence would rally the rearguard and give him enough time to extricate the rest of his army from the narrow pass through which they were marching. The battle intensified around Ptolemy's position and he was set upon by a picked Spartan band led by Evaclus. In the fight that ensued, Ptolemy was slain and his remaining troops were overwhelmed by the triumphant Spartans. Upon hearing of his son's death and the disintegration of his rearguard, Pyrrhus charged the Spartans with his Molossian cavalry, killing Evaclus with his own hand before destroying the remainder of his picked Spartan troops. With the defeat of Evaclus' force, Pyrrhus was able to withdraw the rest of his army from Laconia.

== Aftermath ==
After their evacuation of Laconia, Pyrrhus directed his army towards Argos. Upon learning that Antigonus was in the vicinity, Pyrrhus pitched his camp at Nauplia. After a series of negotiations between the Argives, Macedonians and Epiriotes, Pyrrhus agreed to withdraw from Argos. During the night, he entered Argos accompanied by his army with Aristeas' aid. In the ensuing melee, the Epiriotes were set upon by the Argives as well as Antigonous' Macedonians and a body of Spartans led by Areus, which had been brought into the city by Aristippus' faction. While attempting to retreat, Pyrrhus was struck on the head by a tile and while lying stunned, was decapitated by Antigonus' troops.

Pyrrhus' defeat in the Peloponnese led to the diminution of Epirus' power and the loss of its Macedonian and Thessalian conquests. Antigonus capitalised on his Peloponnesian victory to wrest back control of Macedonia and become the preeminent power in Greece. The establishment of Macedonian dominance led to a breakdown of the Spartan-Macedonian alliance. In a bid to further his own royal ambitions, Areus influenced Sparta to join a coalition of Greek poleis and fought Macedon in the Chremonidean War. The war ended in a crushing Spartan defeat, with Antigonus defeating and killing his former ally Areus in a battle on the Isthmus of Corinth in 265 BC. The defeat was so disastrous for Sparta that it would not rise to be a regional power again until the reign of Cleomenes III thirty years later.

== In popular culture ==
- The siege of Sparta is available to play as one of the historical battles in the award-winning video game, Rome: Total War. The user must command the army of Pyrrhus as he attempts to capture Sparta.
- French painter François Topino-Lebrun painted a work entitled Siège de Sparte par Pyrrhus (Siege of Sparta by Pyrrhus) in 1799–1800 depicting the battle.

== Sources ==
=== Ancient ===
- Pausanias (1918). Description of Greece. Translated by Jones, W. H. S. New York: Harvard University Press.
- Plutarch (1973). Life of Pyrrhus. Translated by Scott-Kilvert, Ian. New York: Penguin Classics. ISBN 0-14-044286-3.

=== Modern ===
- Cartledge, Paul; Spawforth, Antony (1989). Hellenistic and Roman Sparta: A Tale of two Cities. London: Routledge. ISBN 0-415-03290-3.
- Cross, Geoffrey (2015). Epirus. Cambridge: Cambridge University Press. ISBN 9781107458673.
- Fox, Robert Lane (2006). The Classical World. Maryborough: Penguin Books. ISBN 978-0-14-103761-5.
- Green, Peter (1993). Alexander to Actium: The Historical Evolution of the Hellenistic Age. Los Angeles: University of California Press. ISBN 0-500-01485-X.
- Hammond, N. G. L. (1988). A History of Macedonia: 336–167 BC. Oxford: Oxford University Press. ISBN 0198148151.
- Pomeroy, Sarah (2002). Spartan Women. Oxford: Oxford University Press. ISBN 0-415-03290-3.
- Walbank, F. W. (1984). The Cambridge Ancient History, Part 1: The Hellenistic World. Vol. VII. Cambridge: Cambridge University Press. ISBN 0-521-23445-X.
- Wylie, Graham (1999). "Pyrrhus Πολεμιστής". Latomus. 58. II (2). Societe d'Etudes Latines de Bruxelles: 298–313. JSTOR 41538744.
