= Battle of Argos =

272 BC battle between king Pyrrhus of Epirus and a Spartan-Argive-Macedonian alliance

- Part of Pyrrhus' invasion of the Peloponnese
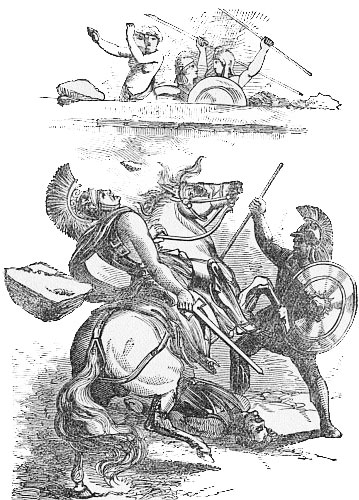
- Death of Pyrrhus. Illustration in Abbott's "History of Pyrrhus", 1901 edition.
Date	272 BC
Location	Argos 37°37′N 22°43′E
Result	Allied victory

Belligerents
Epirus; Macedon (Aeacid)	Argos; Macedon (Antigonid); Sparta

Commanders and leaders
Pyrrhus of Epirus †; Helenus (POW); Aristeas of Argos	Antigonus II Gonatas; Areus I Aristippus of Argos

Strength
Total: 27,000: 25,000 infantry; 2,000 cavalry; 24 war elephants	Unknown: Argives (militia); Antigonid army; 1,000 Cretans and Spartans (Areus)

Casualties and losses
Entire force surrendered	Unknown
- Location within Greece

The Battle of Argos of 272 BC was fought between the forces of Pyrrhus, the king of Epirus, and a spontaneous alliance between the city state of Argos, the Spartan king Areus I and the Macedonian king Antigonus Gonatas. The battle ended with the death of Pyrrhus and the surrender of his army.

== Background ==
In 275 BC, after campaigning in Italy and Sicily for seven years, King Pyrrhus of Epirus returned to Epirus. His treasury depleted by his western campaigns, he planned a new campaign, this time east into Macedonia. When Pyrrhus met with more success than he expected, the expedition turned from a limited raid into a full-scale invasion. After defeating Antigonus Gonatas, the king of Macedonia, at the Battle of the Aous he conquered most of his kingdom. Antigonus held on to several coastal cities due to Pyrrhus' inability to take coastal cities because he lacked a strong fleet. Antigonus himself had a strong fleet and was able to reinforce and supply his coastal holding at will.

Pyrrhus now wasted his victory. Taking possession of Aegae, the ancient capital of Macedonia, he installed a garrison of Gaul mercenaries, who greatly offended the Macedonians by digging up the tombs of their kings and leaving the bones scattered about as they searched for gold. He also neglected to finish off Antigonus; leaving him in control of the coastal cities.

In 272 BC, Cleonymus, a Spartan of royal blood who was denied the throne, asked Pyrrhus to attack Sparta and place him in power. Pyrrhus agreed to the plan, intending to win control of the Peloponnese for himself. Pyrrhus gathered an army of 25,000 infantry, 2,000 cavalry and 24 war elephants and invaded the Peloponnese under the ruse of attacking Antigonid garrisons in southern Greece. He then marched his army through allied country all the way to the south of Sparta and tried to take the city.

Despite the majority of the Spartan army campaigning in Crete, the remaining Spartans were able to mount a defence led by the Spartan prince Acrotatus. The Spartans were able to withstand the Epiriote assaults until the arrival of the main Spartan army, led by King Areus I, and Antigonid reinforcements from Corinth, prompting Pyrrhus to abandon the siege.

After this failure, Pyrrhus ravaged the Spartan hinterland whilst fending off counter-attacks by the victorious Spartans. His retreating army was continuously harried by the Spartans under the command of Areus. By setting ambushes and occupying important positions along the Epiriote line of retreat, the Spartans were able to inflict significant casualties on Pyrrhus' rearguard, killing his son Ptolemy.

Pyrrhus had little time to mourn, as he was immediately offered an opportunity to intervene in a civic dispute in Argos. He was approached by Aristeas, the leader of the democratic faction in Argos, who sought support to counter the pro-Macedonian aristocratic party of Argos led by Aristippus.

== Prelude ==
Pyrrhus' advance on Argos did not go smoothly as his army was constantly harassed by vengeful Spartan troops led by Areus. In an attempt to restore the wavering morale of his rear, Pyrrhus sent Ptolemy to assume its command. Pyrrhus hoped that the presence of his son amongst the troops would stiffen their resolve and enable him to extricate the remainder of his troops from the narrow pass through which they were passing. Ptolemy's position was attacked by a select Spartan war band under the command of Evaclus. In the ensuing struggle, Ptolemy was slain by the Spartans causing his remaining troops to rout. The victorious Spartans pursued the fleeing Epiriote rearguard until they were checked by some Epiriote infantry.

Upon hearing of his son's death and the collapse of his rearguard, Pyrrhus summoned his Molossian cavalry and charged the Spartans. In the battle that followed, Pyrrhus killed the Spartan Evaclus with his own hand and succeeded in annihilating the pursuing Spartan troops. After this skirmish, the Epiriotes continued their march to Argos.

Upon reaching his destination, he found that Antigonus had arrived at Argos first and camped to the city's north. The Macedonian presence compelled Pyrrhus to pitch camp at Nauplion to the south of Argos.

Pyrrhus attempted to goad Antigonus into fighting a pitched battle on the plain in front of Argos but the Macedonian king was unmoved. The Argives sent ambassadors to both kings, beseeching them to respect the city's neutrality. Antigonus agreed to the Argives' terms and gave his son as a hostage in order to demonstrate his sincerity. While Pyrrhus agreed to retreat from Argos, he failed to give a pledge and as a result was regarded with suspicion.

== Battle ==
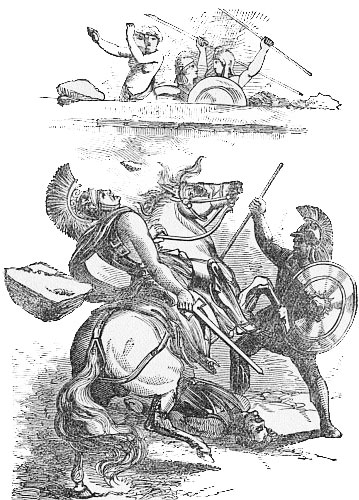
Illustration depicting Pyrrhus's death from a 1901 history book.

Aristeas contacted Pyrrhus and offered to open one of the city gates during the night. Not wanting to waste the opportunity, Pyrrhus sprang into action. During the night he used the opened gate to infiltrate the city and take possession of the market place with his Gallic mercenaries. The gate, however, was too small to admit his war elephants, so their handlers were forced to take off their towers and put them back on again once they were in the city. The darkness and the elephants caused considerable delay.

During this delay the Argives became aware of the Pyrrhic forces in the city and sounded the alarm. They rushed to take control of strong points in the city and sent messages to Antigonus who was still in the vicinity. Antigonus marched back to Argos and sent a relief force into the city to assist in the defence. Meanwhile, Areus had arrived with a 1,000-men strong force of Spartans and Cretans. He was also admitted into the city and his forces bolstered the defences even more.

The Argives, assisted by their allies, launched an assault on Pyrrhus' Gaul mercenaries in the market place. Pyrrhus realized his vanguard was in trouble and pressed his troops forward. There was confused fighting all over the city in the darkness which soon forced the combatants to separate until daybreak.

At dawn Pyrrhus became aware of the forces arrayed against him. He decided it was prudent to withdraw from the city. Not wanting to be delayed by the small gate again, he sent a messenger to his son Helenus, whom he had left in command of the forces outside the city, with orders to tear down part of the city wall in order to make a quick exit. Unfortunately for Pyrrhus, the messenger misheard his orders and instead delivered an order to advance into the city. Helenus marched into the city with the rest of the elephants and the pick of his troops. Pyrrhus was, however, in full retreat and the advancing and retreating forces clashed causing chaos. Meanwhile, the Argives, Spartans, Cretans and Antigonids attacked Pyrrhus' retreating forces.

The disorder was exacerbated when Pyrrhus' largest elephant fell and blocked the gateway and another elephant started running amok after his mahout was felled. In the fighting which ensued, Pyrrhus was wounded by a spear wielded by an Argive. As Pyrrhus turned to strike down his assailant, he was hit on the head by a roof tile thrown by his attacker's mother who was watching the fight from her rooftop. Pyrrhus was either killed by the force of the tile's impact or, alternately, having fallen dazed from his horse he was decapitated by Zopyrus, one of Antigonus' Macedonian soldiers. Halcyoneus, a son of Antigonus, brought Pyrrhus' head to Antigonus, who expressed dismay when he saw it and upbraided his son for acting in such a barbarous manner. Upon Pyrrhus' death, Epiriote resistance crumbled and Antigonus accepted the surrender of Helenus, giving him Pyrrhus' body for burial.

== Aftermath ==
Antigonus emerged from the conflict as the unchallenged ruler of Macedon and the leading power in Greece. After his victory in Argos, Antigonus was able to install his supporter Aristippos as tyrant of Argos and appointed various pro-Macedonian leaders as tyrants in other Greek cities. His support for tyrants over democratic rulers would lead to growing resentment amongst the Greek cities against Macedon. On his journey north to Macedon, Antigonus succeeded in placing garrisons in the cities of Chalcis and Eretria on the important island of Euboia with the outcome being that he further consolidated his power in Greece. The Spartan-Macedon alliance proved to be transient. Angered by Macedon's supremacy and full of ambition, Areus formed a coalition with several Greek poleis, most notably Athens. In the resulting Chremonidean War, Areus was slain by his former ally Antigonus in a battle on the Isthmus of Corinth in 265 BC. The war ended in a defeat that was so crushing for Sparta that it would not rise as a regional power again until the reign of Cleomenes III thirty years later.

== Sources ==
Ancient Sources

- Plutarch, Parallel Lives, Life of Pyrrhus.

Modern Sources

- Jeff Champion, Pyrrhus of Epirus.
