= Pyrrhus's invasion of the Peloponnese =

Pyrrhus's campaigns in the Peloponnese

- The Siege of Sparta by Pyrrhus, by François Topino-Lebrun
Date	272 BC
Location	Peloponnese
Result	Macedonian and Spartan victory
Territorial changes	Epirus loses control of Macedon and Thessaly

Belligerents
Epirus; Macedonia (Aeacid); Argive democratic faction	Macedonia (Antigonid); Sparta; Messene; Argive oligarchic faction

Commanders and leaders
Pyrrhus of Epirus †; Ptolemy †	Antigonus II Gonatas; Areus I Acrotatus

Strength
27,000 troops 25,000 infantry 2,000 cavalry 24 war elephants	Unknown

In 272 BC, Pyrrhus, King of Epirus, invaded the Peloponnese in south Greece. He was opposed by Antigonus Gonatas and a coalition of Greek city-states (poleis), most notably Sparta. The war ended in a joint victory by Antigonus and Sparta.

After being defeated by the Roman Republic in the Pyrrhic War in 275 BC, Pyrrhus (r. 297–272 BC) decided to turn his attention to Greece. He declared war on Antigonus Gonatas (r. 283–239 BC) of Macedon and in a rapid campaign, managed to defeat him and make himself king of Macedon. In 272 BC, Pyrrhus agreed to assist the disgruntled Spartan prince, Cleonymus, who requested his assistance in securing the Spartan throne.

Pyrrhus advanced with his army through central Greece and upon reaching the Peloponnese, he marched against Sparta. The city was sparsely defended at the time as the majority of its army had been taken to Crete by King Areus I (r. 309–265 BC). The Spartans led by Crown Prince Acrotatus were able to withstand a series of Epiriote assaults until Macedonian reinforcements and Areus's army arrived to relieve the defenders.

Following the arrival of the relieving force, Pyrrhus lifted the siege and prepared to winter in Laconia. However, he was approached by an Argive citizen who requested his assistance in overthrowing the government of Argos. Seeking to take advantage of the opportunity, Pyrrhus took his army to Argos, being harried along the way by the Spartans. Whilst attempting to seize Argos by night, Pyrrhus was set upon by his Argive opponents as well as the Spartans and Antigonus's Macedonians. In the ensuing mêlée, Pyrrhus was slain. His death prompted the capitulation of his army and the reestablishment of a Macedonian hegemony over Greece.

== Prelude ==
Map depicting the campaigns of Pyrrhus in southern Italy and Sicily and the location of the Kingdom of Epirus in Greece

Following entreaties from the Greek polis of Tarentum in 281 BC, Pyrrhus, the king of Epirus in northern Greece, invaded Italy with an army of 25,500 and 20 war elephants. The aim of the expedition was to combat the aggression of the Roman Republic, which was increasingly annexing the Greek cities of Magna Graecia. Upon arriving in Italy in 280 BC, Pyrrhus assumed command of an army consisting of the Greeks of Magna Graecia. Adding these forces to his own from Epirus, he engaged and defeated the Roman army at the Battle of Heraclea, near Tarentum in 280 BC. The Epiriote victory caused a number of native groups such as the Samnites and the Lucanians, who were also fearful of Roman expansionism to join Pyrrhus. Subsequently, Pyrrhus advanced towards Rome and at the Battle of Asculum he vanquished another Roman army.

Despite having bested the Romans in their battles, Pyrrhus had sustained heavy casualties. With his Italian allies wavering, Pyrrhus decided to abandon his campaign against Rome. At this point in time, Pyrrhus had two options available. Firstly, he could return to Greece where the throne of Macedon had been left vacant by the death of King Ptolemy Keraunos at the hands of the Gallic invaders of Greece. Pyrrhus had coveted the Macedonian throne and had briefly held it from 287 BC to 285 BC. Alternatively, he could respond to the appeal of the Greek poleis of Sicily which were requesting his assistance to combat Carthaginian aggression.

Ultimately, in 278 BC, Pyrrhus decided to direct his army against the Carthaginians in Sicily. Pyrrhus was highly successful in his campaign against Carthage and by 275 BC had managed to restrict them to the settlement of Lilybaeum in the far west of the island. Despite these victories, Pyrrhus's despotic disposition and pretensions alienated his Sicilian allies who began to abandon him. In light of these developments, Pyrrhus decided to return to mainland Italy to continue his war against Rome. The Epiriotes attacked the Roman army but after the inconclusive Battle of Beneventum, he returned to Epirus. Despite Pyrrhus leaving a garrison there, Tarentum succumbed to Rome in 272 BC.

== War against Macedon ==
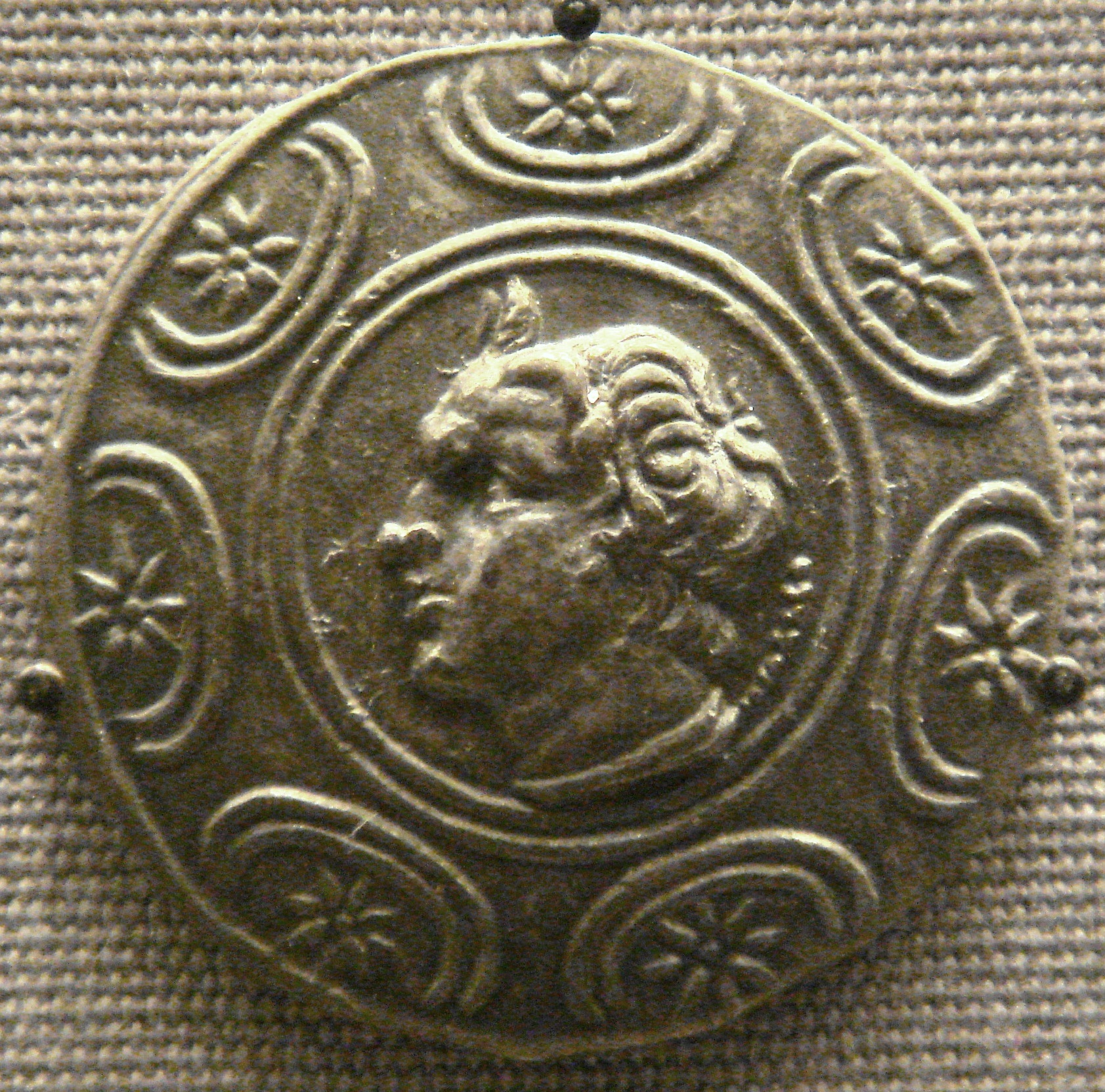
A Macedonian coin depicting King Antigonus II of Macedon (r. 283–239 BC), who managed to reclaim his kingdom after defeating Pyrrhus

On his return to his homeland, Pyrrhus found himself in a difficult position. His Italian sojourn had emptied his coffers and crippled his army, leaving him reliant on Sicilian mercenaries who required payment. In order to secure funds to pay his troops, Pyrrhus planned a war against Antigonus II Gonatas, the new king of Macedon. Citing Antigonus's refusal to provide him with aid during his Italian expedition as a casus belli, Pyrrhus invaded Macedon in the spring of 274 BC. He was accompanied by an army consisting of 8,000 infantry and 500 cavalry although their numbers were probably augmented by Gallic mercenaries. It has been speculated that by invading Macedon, Pyrrhus was acting as the agent of the monarchs of Ptolemaic Egypt, Ptolemy II and Arsinoe II, however N. G. L. Hammond posits that this is highly unlikely.

Initially, Pyrrhus had simply viewed his incursion into Macedon as an opportunity to plunder. However, the capture of numerous towns and the defection to his side of 2,000 Macedonian soldiers caused him to make his objective the seizure of the Macedonian throne. Antigonus marched with his army to western Macedon and was confronted by Pyrrhus at the Battle of the Aous. Pyrrhus began the engagements by slaughtering Antigonus's Gallic rearguard before securing the surrender of the Macedonian war elephants. Demoralised by these sudden reverses, the Macedonian phalangites responded to Pyrrhus's appeals and defected to the Epiriote side. Abandoned by his army, Antigonus managed to escape to Thessaloniki with a small force of cavalry. He was able to entrench himself there, protected by his strong navy which enabled him to maintain links with his possessions in Greece.

Antigonus's flight left Pyrrhus in complete control of the Macedonian hinterland and Thessaly in central Greece. However, not all of Macedon surrendered to the Epirote king and he was compelled to send his general, the Spartan Prince Cleonymus to capture Edessa. Despite initially being welcomed with enthusiasm by the Macedonians, he managed to alienate his new subjects when his Gallic troops ransacked the royal Macedonian tombs at Vergina. By late 274 BC or early 273 BC, Pyrrhus secured the occupation of Macedonia and returned to Epirus, leaving his son Ptolemy to govern the region.

== Advance into the Peloponnese ==
A map depicting the Peloponnese. Pyrrhus advanced from Achaia in the north to Sparta before turning back north-east towards Argos.

Following his Macedonian triumph, Pyrrhus was approached by his officer Cleonymus. The Spartan convinced the Epiriote king to aid him in a scheme to seize control of his homeland. Cleonymus's reasons for seeking to attack Sparta were twofold. Firstly, he was angry that he had been overlooked for the Agiad kingship of Sparta in favour of his nephew, Areus II. Plutarch ascribes Cleonymus's failure to secure the throne to his arbitrariness and violent nature. Furthermore, Cleonymus had become a target of ridicule in Sparta by the fact that his new wife, Chilonis, was engaging in an affair with Acrotatus, the son of Areus.

Pyrrhus's motivation for agreeing to assist Cleonymus is more complex. By installing Cleonymus on the throne, the Epiriote would secure Sparta as an ally. Additionally, by invading the Peloponnese, Pyrrhus would be able to subdue any cities which had remained loyal to Antigonus. In doing so, he could prevent Antigonus using the peninsula as a base from which to launch a counter-attack on Macedon. The size of the force assembled by Pyrrhus is indicative of his intention to extend his hegemony into the Peloponnese. The Epiriote king mustered an army consisting of 25,000 infantry and 2,000 cavalry as well as 24 war elephants. In 272 BC, Pyrrhus marched his army through Central Greece to the city of Pleuron from where they were ferried across the Gulf of Corinth to the Peloponnese. This suggests that the invasion was supported by the Aetolian League, a powerful confederate in Central Greece which was allied with Pyrrhus and hostile to Antigonus.

Antigonus attempted to exploit Pyrrhus's absence from Macedon by launching an invasion to reclaim his kingdom. However, his attack on Macedon was unsuccessful as he was defeated in battle by Pyrrhus's son, Ptolemy. Unperturbed by Antigonus's offensive, Pyrrhus advanced into the Peloponnese where he was welcomed in Achaia. The Epiriote army marched to Megalopolis, a central Peloponnesian city which lay on the border with Sparta. Several of Sparta's neighbours, namely Megalopolis, Elis and many of the Achaians poleis, supported Pyrrhus's invasion as they would profit from the reduction of Spartan influence in the region. While his force was camped at Megalopolis, Pyrrhus received ambassadors from Messene, Athens, the Achaian League and Sparta. In response to the Spartans' inquires as to the reasons for his Peloponnesian incursion, Pyrrhus managed to dupe the envoys. He told the Spartans that he had come to liberate any cities still held by Antigonus and that he hoped to send his sons to Sparta to obtain a traditional education at the agoge. However, when the emissaries returned to Sparta, Pyrrhus advanced into Laconia. He advanced south, following the course of the Eurotas River and ravaging the lands of the Spartan perioeci. It may have been at this time that Pyrrhus assigned Cleonymus a series of independent commands as he is recorded as subjugating the city of Alifeira in Elis as well as sacking Zarax in the Parnon region of Laconia. Pyrrhus's perfidy was met with anger in Sparta and ambassadors were immediately sent to Pyrrhus to rebuke him.

== Siege of Sparta ==
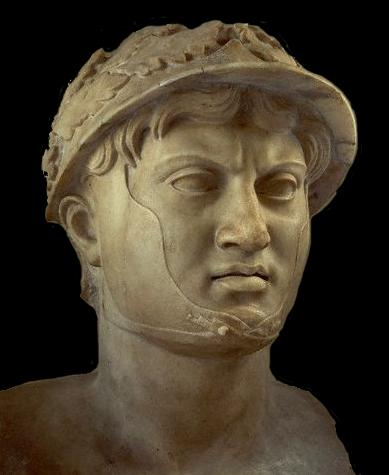
A bust of Pyrrhus, king of Epirus, at the National Archaeological Museum of Naples. Pyrrhus's ambition and recklessness led to his untimely death at Argos.

The Spartans were caught unawares by Pyrrhus's invasion. Areus had taken the majority of the Spartan army with him to Crete, where he was campaigning on behalf of Gortyn at the request of Ptolemaic Egypt. The result was that the settlement was lightly defended. Arriving at Sparta as night fell, Cleonymus advised Pyrrhus to attack the city immediately. However, the Epiriote declined to as he was fearful of the damage that would be wrought by Gallic troops if they entered the city at night and moreover expected the sparsely defended city to surrender in the morning.

The Spartan council of Elders, the gerousia, suggested that the Spartan women be sent to Crete for their protection. They were dissuaded from doing so by Archidamia, the former queen and grandmother of the Eurypontid King Eudamidas II who convinced them that the women could assist in the city's defence. In order to guarantee the fighting men some rest, the women and the elderly began bolstering defences. Aware that Pyrrhus had elephants with him, the defenders dug a large trench and sunk wagons into the ground at its flanks in order to hinder the Epiriote advance. Moreover, messengers were sent both to summon Areus back and to request aid from Antigonus, despite the fact the Sparta and Macedon had traditionally been hostile. Pausanias, the Greek geographer, claims that Sparta received some aid from Messene and the pro-Spartan faction at Argos.

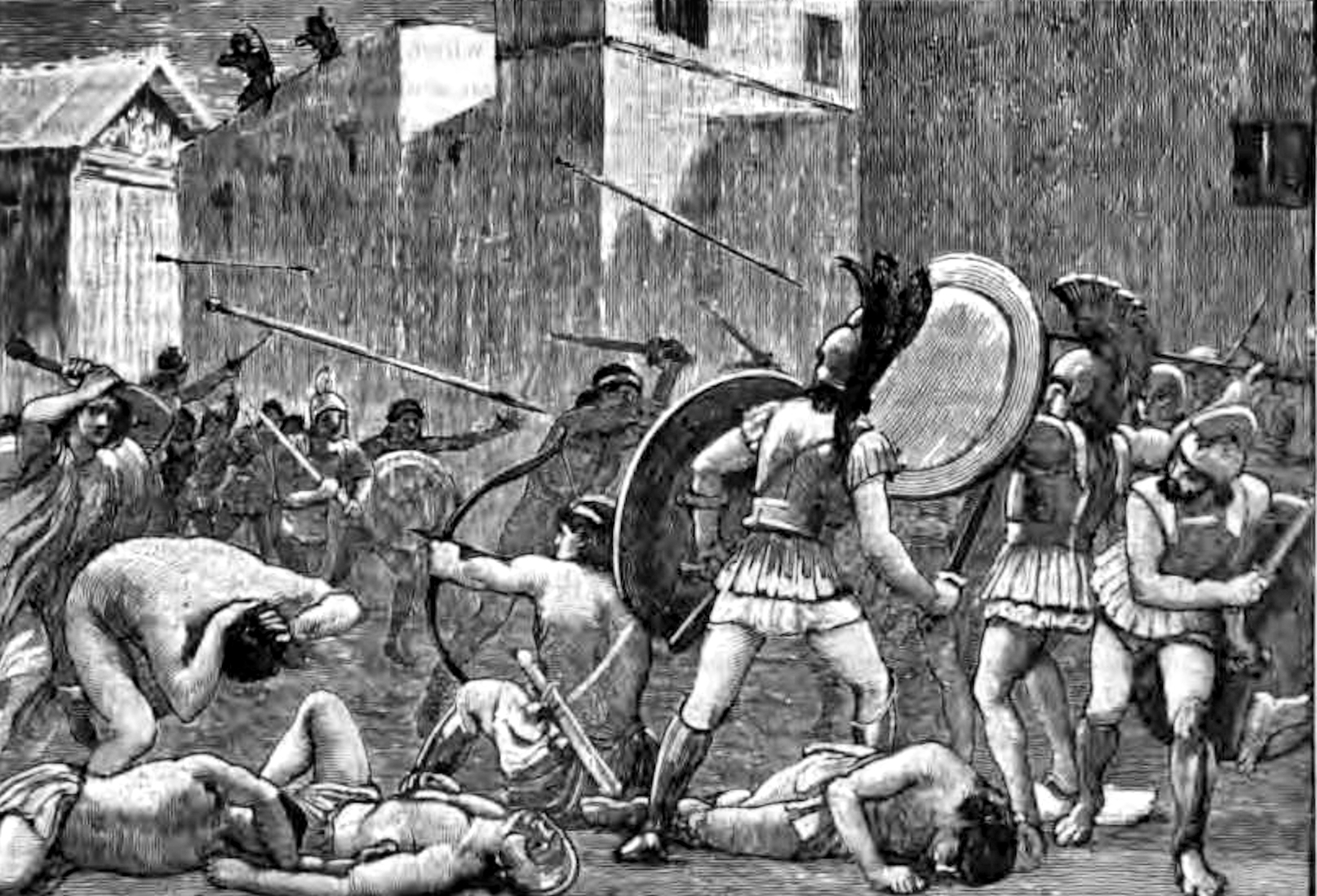
Repulse of Pyrrhus from Sparta

The Epiriotes launched their first assault against the city at daybreak. However, they were unable to get a firm footing because of the trench and were repulsed by the defenders, who were encouraged by the women. In order to circumvent this obstacle. Pyrrhus ordered a 2,000 picked force of Gauls and Chaonians commanded by Ptolemy to attempt to go around the trench. Finding their path blocked by the wagons, they began to pulling them out of the ground. Aware of the danger, Acrotatus used a series of depressions to attack this force from the rear and managed to the push the Epiriote flanking group into the trench after inflicting heavy casualties upon them. Unable to make an impact on the defences, Pyrrhus ordered his troops to withdraw to their camp at nightfall.

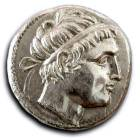
A coin depicting King Areus of Sparta (309–265 BC), whose arrival with reinforcements saved Sparta from Pyrrhus

After receiving a favourable omen during the night Pyrrhus renewed his assault. An effect of the shortage of warriors was that the Spartan women were active in providing the defenders with missiles and refreshments as well as taking away the wounded. In an attempt to nullify the Spartans' advantage, the Epiriotes tried to fill up with trench with debris and bodies but were prevented from doing so by the Sparta. Responding to this Spartan counter-attack, Pyrrhus personally led a charge against the Spartan lines and succeeded in entering the city, spreading panic amongst the defenders. However, at this point his horse threw him after it was wounded by a javelin in the belly. Pyrrhus's fall threw his companions into a state of dismay, permitting the Spartans to rally and they managed to slay many of the companions in a barrage of missiles. Despite this, Pyrrhus was taken safely back to his camp.

Prompted by this unsuccessful foray, Pyrrhus order his army to return to its camp. He now expected the Spartans seek terms as the severity of their casualties would make the defence unsustainable. However, Sparta was saved by the arrival of unexpected reinforcements. In the interim, Antigonus had launched another offensive in northern Greece and succeeded in evicting Pyrrhus's garrisons from Macedon (this possibly accounts for the presence of Ptolemy in Pyrrhus's army). Having reclaimed his kingdom, Antigonus moved south into the Peloponnese, probably using the sea route to avoid a confrontation with the Aetolian League. Upon his arrival in Corinth, he sent his general Ameinias the Phocian with a group of mercenaries to assist the Spartans. The arrival of the Macedonia mercenaries was closely followed by Areus's return from Crete with 2,000 men. Enheartened by the arrival of these reinforcements, the defenders prepared to face Pyrrhus's next assault. The Epiriotes launched an attack in the morning but after this was repelled Pyrrhus became convinced of the futility of the situation and ordered his men to lift the siege.

== March to Argos ==
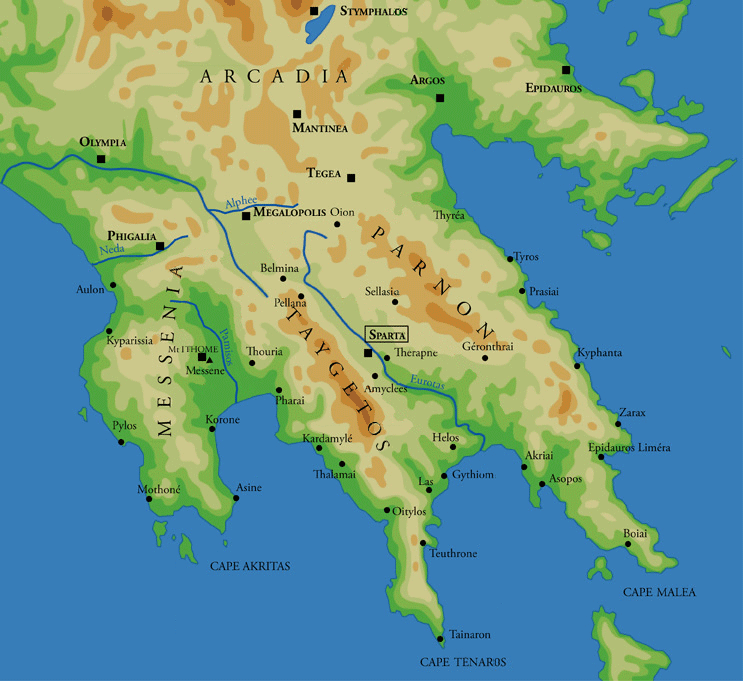
A map of the southern and central Peloponnese (the southernmost area of Greece) showing important cities of the region

Pyrrhus retreated with his army into the Laconian hinterland with the purpose of wintering there before making another attempt against Sparta. However, as his troops were ravaging the surrounding countryside, he received news that Antigonus was marching on Argos from Corinth on his way to trap Pyrrhus in Laconia. Pyrrhus was approached by Aristeas, the leader of the democratic faction in Argos, who sought Epiriote support to counter the pro-Macedonian aristocratic party of Argos led by Aristippos. Accepting Aristeas' proposal, Pyrrhus began his march north to the Argolis.

Pyrrhus's advance on Argos did not go smoothly as his army was constantly harassed by vengeful Spartan troops led by Areus. By setting up ambushes and occupying strategic positions along the Epiriote line of retreat, the Spartans were able to inflict heavy casualties on Pyrrhus's rearguard of Gauls and Molossians. In an attempt to restore the wavering morale of his rear, Pyrrhus sent Ptolemy to assume its command. Pyrrhus hoped that the presence of his son amongst the troops would stiffen their resolve and enable to him to extricate the remainder of his troops from the narrow pass through which they were passing. Ptolemy's position was attacked by a picked Spartan war band under the command of Evaclus. In the ensuing struggle, Ptolemy was slain by the Spartans causing his remaining troops to rout. The victorious Spartans pursued the fleeing Epiriote rearguard until they were checked by some Epiriote infantry.

Upon hearing of his son's death and the collapse of his rearguard, Pyrrhus summoned his Molossian cavalry and charged the Spartans. In the battle that followed, Pyrrhus killed the Spartan leader Evaclus with his own hand and succeeded in annihilating the pursuing Spartan troops. After this skirmish, the Epiriotes continued their march to Argos. However, upon reaching his destination, he found that Antigonus had arrived at Argos first and camped to the city's north. The Macedonian presence compelled Pyrrhus to pitch camp at Nauplion to the south of Argos.

Pyrrhus attempted to goad Antigonus into fighting a pitched battle on the plain in front of Argos but the Macedonian king was unmoved. The Argives sent ambassadors to both kings, beseeching them to respect the city's neutrality. Antigonus agreed to the Argives' terms and gave his son as a hostage in order to demonstrate his sincerity. While Pyrrhus agreed to retreat from Argos, he failed to give a pledge and as a result was regarded with suspicion.

== Battle of Argos ==
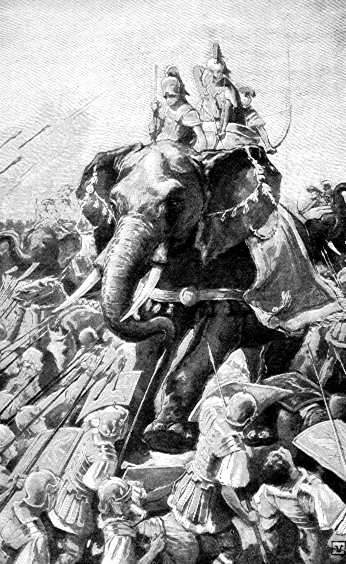
A depiction of Pyrrhus and his war elephants. He brought 24 elephants with him to invade the Peloponnese. Pyrrhus's use of elephants in the Battle of Argos led to his demise.

During the night, Pyrrhus was able to enter Argos. While Pausanias recounts that he did so by force, Plutarch asserts that Diamperes Gate had been left open for the Epiriotes by Aristeas. Hammond opines that it is more likely that Aristeas admitted Pyrrhus into the city. Although Pyrrhus's Gauls were able to occupy the Argive agora, the rest of the army was delayed due to the war elephants being too large to pass through the gate. In order for them to enter, the towers need to be taken off their backs and reattached once they were inside the city. Furthermore, Pyrrhus left the majority of his army outside the city walls under the command of his son Helenus. This delay gave the Argives enough time to reach their citadel, the Aspis, and seek aid from Antigonus. The Macedonian king responded immediately, advancing towards the city walls and sending a relief force inside under the command of his son Halcyoneus.

The situation further deteriorated for Pyrrhus when Areus entered Argos with a force of 1,000 lightly armed Cretans and Spartans. The Argives, assisted by their Spartan and Macedonian allies, launched a counter-attack on Pyrrhus's Gallic troops in the agora and threw them into a state of panic. Due to the labyrinthine layout of the city and the darkness, both Pyrrhus's advancing troops and those of his opponents become scattered throughout Argos. The result was that Pyrrhus, entering the city at the head of his cavalry to assist the Gauls, was unable to effectively communicate his commands to his soldiers. Realising the difficulty of his situation, Pyrrhus ordered his army to retreat from Argos as day broke.

Understanding that the gates were too narrow for his army to exit in an orderly fashion, Pyrrhus ordered Helenus to tear down part of the wall and to be prepared to fend off any enemy counter-attacks against the retreating troops. However, the instructions brought by the messenger were unclear and instead of organising the retreat, Helenus advanced with the rest of the army into Argos. With the majority of his troops streaming in through the gates, Pyrrhus's line of retreat was blocked off. The disorder was exacerbated when Pyrrhus's largest elephant fell and blocked the gateway and another elephant started running amok after his mahout was felled. The weight of the enemy's assault pushed Pyrrhus and his troops from the agora and compelled them to fight in the narrow street leading to the Diamperes Gate. In the fighting which ensued, Pyrrhus was wounded by a spear wielded by an Argive. As Pyrrhus turned to strike down his assailant, he was hit on the head by a roof tile thrown by his attacker's mother. Pyrrhus was either killed by the force of the tile's impact or, alternately, having fallen dazed from his horse he was decapitated by one of Antigonus's Macedonian soldiers, Zopyrus. Pyrrhus's head was brought by Halcyoneus to Antigonus, who expressed dismay when he saw it and upbraided his son for acting in such a barbarous manner. Upon Pyrrhus's death, Epiriote resistance crumbled and Antigonus accepted the surrender of Helenus, giving him Pyrrhus's body for burial.

== Aftermath ==
The expedition into the Peloponnese was a disaster for Epiriote ambitions. Although Helenus was permitted by Antigonus to return to his homeland with the remainder of his army, Epirus ceased to be a regional power. Pyrrhus's son and successor, Alexander II of Epirus was granted generous terms by the Macedonian king. Epirus was able to keep Pyrrhus's conquests of Tymphaea, Parauaea and Atintania in western Macedon. Antigonus realised that an independent Epirus was essential in order to act as a buffer against the Illyrians to the north.

Antigonus emerged from the conflict as the unchallenged ruler of Macedon and the leading power in Greece. After his victory in Argos, Antigonus was able to install his supporter Aristippos as tyrant of the city and appointed various pro-Macedonian leaders as tyrants in other Greek cities. His support for tyrants over democratic rulers would lead to growing resentment amongst the Greek cities against Macedon. On his journey north to Macedon, Antigonus succeeded in placing garrisons in the cities of Chalcis and Eretria on the important island of Euboia with the outcome being that he further consolidated his power in Greece. The Spartan-Macedon alliance proved to be transient. Angered by Macedon's supremacy and full of ambition, Areus formed a coalition with several Greek poleis, most notably Athens. In the resulting Chremonidean War, Areus was slain by his former ally Antigonus in a battle on the Isthmus of Corinth in 265 BC. The war ended in a defeat that was so crushing for Sparta that it would not rise as a regional power again until the reign of Cleomenes III thirty years later.

== Sources ==
=== Ancient sources ===
- Pausanias (1918). Description of Greece. Translated by Jones, W. H. S. New York: Harvard University Press.
- Plutarch (1973). Life of Pyrrhus. Translated by Scott-Kilvert, Ian. New York: Penguin Classics. ISBN 0-14-044286-3.

=== Modern sources ===
- Cartledge, Paul; Spawforth, Antony (1989). Hellenistic and Roman Sparta: A tale of two cities. London: Routledge. ISBN 0-415-03290-3.
- Cross, Geoffrey (2015). Epirus. Cambridge: Cambridge University Press. ISBN 9781107458673.
- Fox, Robert Lane (2006). The Classical World. Maryborough: Penguin Books. ISBN 978-0-14-103761-5.
- Green, Peter (1993). Alexander to Actium: The Historical Evolution of the Hellenistic Age. Los Angeles: University of California Press. ISBN 0-500-01485-X.
- Hammond, N. G. L. (1988). A History of Macedonia: 336–167 BC. Oxford: Oxford University Press. ISBN 0198148151.
- Pomeroy, Sarah (2002). Spartan Women. Oxford: Oxford University Press. ISBN 0-415-03290-3.
- Walbank, F. W. (1984). The Cambridge Ancient History, Volume 7, Part 1: The Hellenistic World. Cambridge: Cambridge University Press.
- Wylie, Graham (1999). "Pyrrhus Πολεμιστής". Latomus. 58. 2 (2). Societe d'Etudes Latines de Bruxelles: 298–313. JSTOR 41538744.
