= Areus I =

King of Sparta from 309 to 265

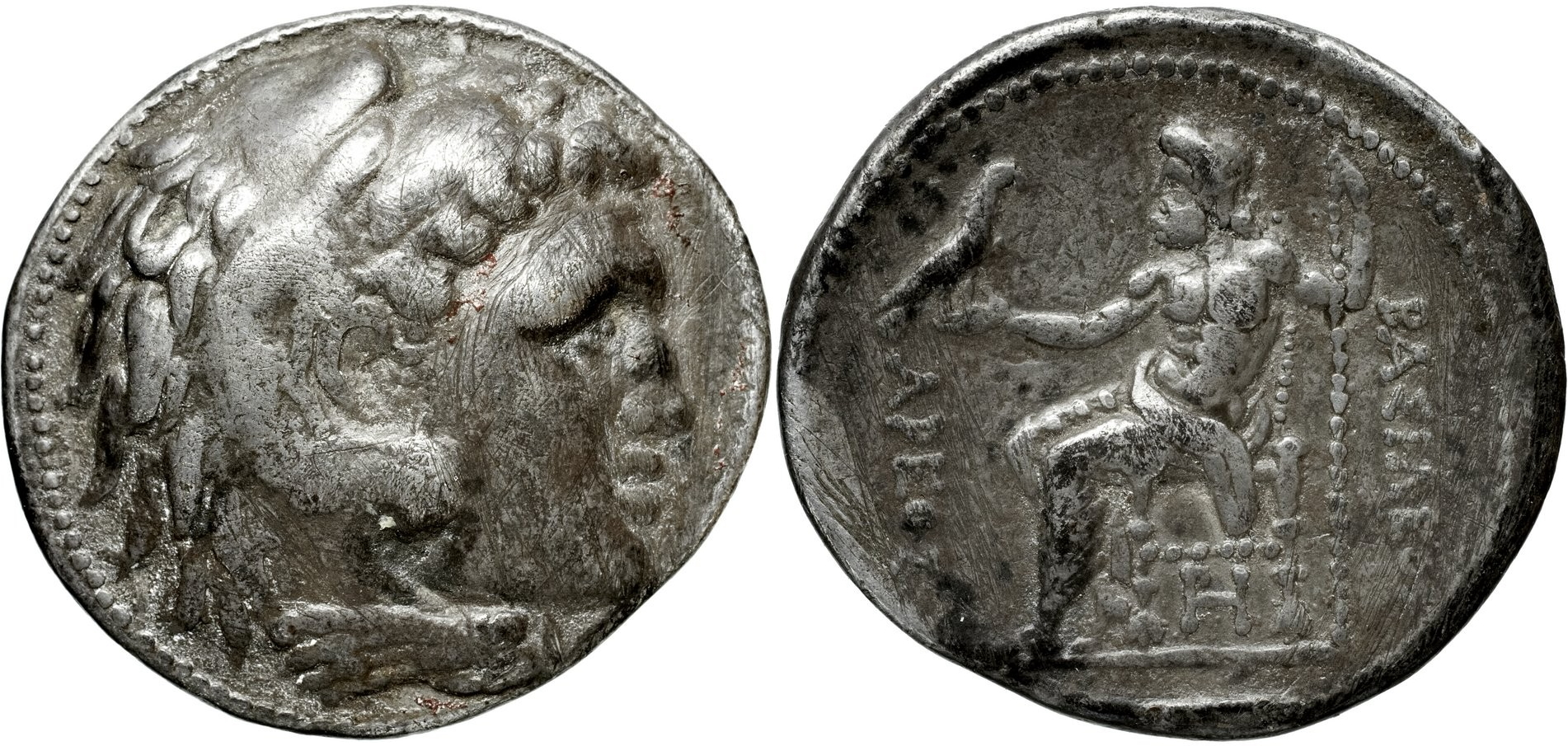
- Tetradrachm of Areus, minted c. 265 BC. The first Spartan coin.

King of Sparta
- Reign: 309–265 BC
- Predecessor: Cleomenes II
- Successor: Acrotatus II
- Died: 265 BC

Areus I (Ancient Greek: Ἀρεύς; c. 320 or 312 – 265 BC) was the Agiad King of Sparta from 309 to 265 BC. His reign is noted for his attempts to transform Sparta into a Hellenistic kingdom and to recover its former pre-eminence in Greece, notably against the kings Antigonos Gonatas of Macedonia and Pyrrhus of Epirus.

The first part of Areus' reign was dominated by the influence of his uncle and regent Cleonymus, a skilled general who campaigned in Greece and abroad at the head of mercenary armies. Areus' first record in the scanty ancient sources was in 281 BC, when he led an alliance of Greek city-states to challenge Macedonian control over Greece, but was rapidly defeated by the Aitolian League (allied with Macedonia). In 275 BC, Cleonymus defected to Pyrrhus of Epirus, who launched an invasion of the Peloponnese in 272 BC. Areus nevertheless repelled the attack and pursued Pyrrhus until his death in Argos. Thanks to the prestige of this victory, Areus established another alliance, in 267 BC with Athens and Egypt against the Macedonian king Antigonos Gonatas. The following Chremonidean War was, however, a disaster for the Spartan-led Greeks; Areus died in battle near Corinth in 265 BC.

Although the military activity of Areus shows that Sparta had temporarily regained some of its former glory, the main interest of his reign is the introduction of Hellenistic features in traditionally austere Sparta. For the first time in centuries, prominent artists are found in Sparta—likely attracted by the sponsorship of Areus, who probably built the first theatre in the city. Areus is also known as the king who first minted coins in Sparta, money having hitherto been banned. His posture as a Hellenistic king brought him considerable international prestige, but altered the constitutional order of the city, notably by eclipsing kings of the other Spartan royal dynasty, the Eurypontids.

In order to facilitate his recruitment of Jewish mercenaries, Areus claimed a shared ancestry with the Jews, who answered favourably and later repeatedly renewed their friendship with Sparta, even though the reality of this Spartan-Jewish connection is disputed.

== Family background and regency ==
Areus was the son of Acrotatus, and the grandson of Cleomenes II (r. 370–309), king of Sparta of the Agiad dynasty, one of the two royal families at Sparta (the other being the Eurypontids). As Cleomenes' reign was very long, his son Acrotatus died before him, and Areus succeeded his grandfather in about 309. Karl Julius Beloch has suggested that Areus was born shortly after his father had come back from a mission in Sicily in 312. Paul Cartledge favours an earlier date, about 320.

Pausanias, a Greek geographer of the 2nd century AD, as well as Plutarch, tell that since Areus was still a young child in 309, Cleomenes' second son Cleonymus contested the claim of his nephew, but the Gerousia—the supreme assembly at Sparta—still upheld the traditional linear succession of the Spartan kingship, and ruled in favour of Areus. However, this story may be a retrojection from Pausanias in light of the later opposition between Areus and Cleonymus. Moreover, succession disputes were normally settled before the ekklesia—the citizen assembly at Sparta—not the Gerousia, as in 400 when Agesilaus II was chosen king against the initial claim of his nephew Leotychidas. Cleonymus was then made the regent of Areus, thus indicating that he did not challenge the oligarchic order.

Cleonymus retained a prominent place during the first half of Areus' reign, commanding mercenary armies with official support, such as in 303, when Sparta sent him to help Tarentum against Lucanians and the Roman Republic. Pausanias further tells that Cleonymus was given the command of the army as a compensation for his denied claim on the throne, but this is probably another invention as there is nothing unusual for the regent to receive such command. For example, in 479, Pausanias won the Battle of Plataea as regent to his younger cousin Pleistarchus.

Nothing is known of Areus until 281, principally because of the loss of several ancient sources, but also because Sparta was now only a regional power of lesser interest for ancient historians, who did not record its activity.

== Reign ==
=== Fifth Sacred War (281–280 BC) ===
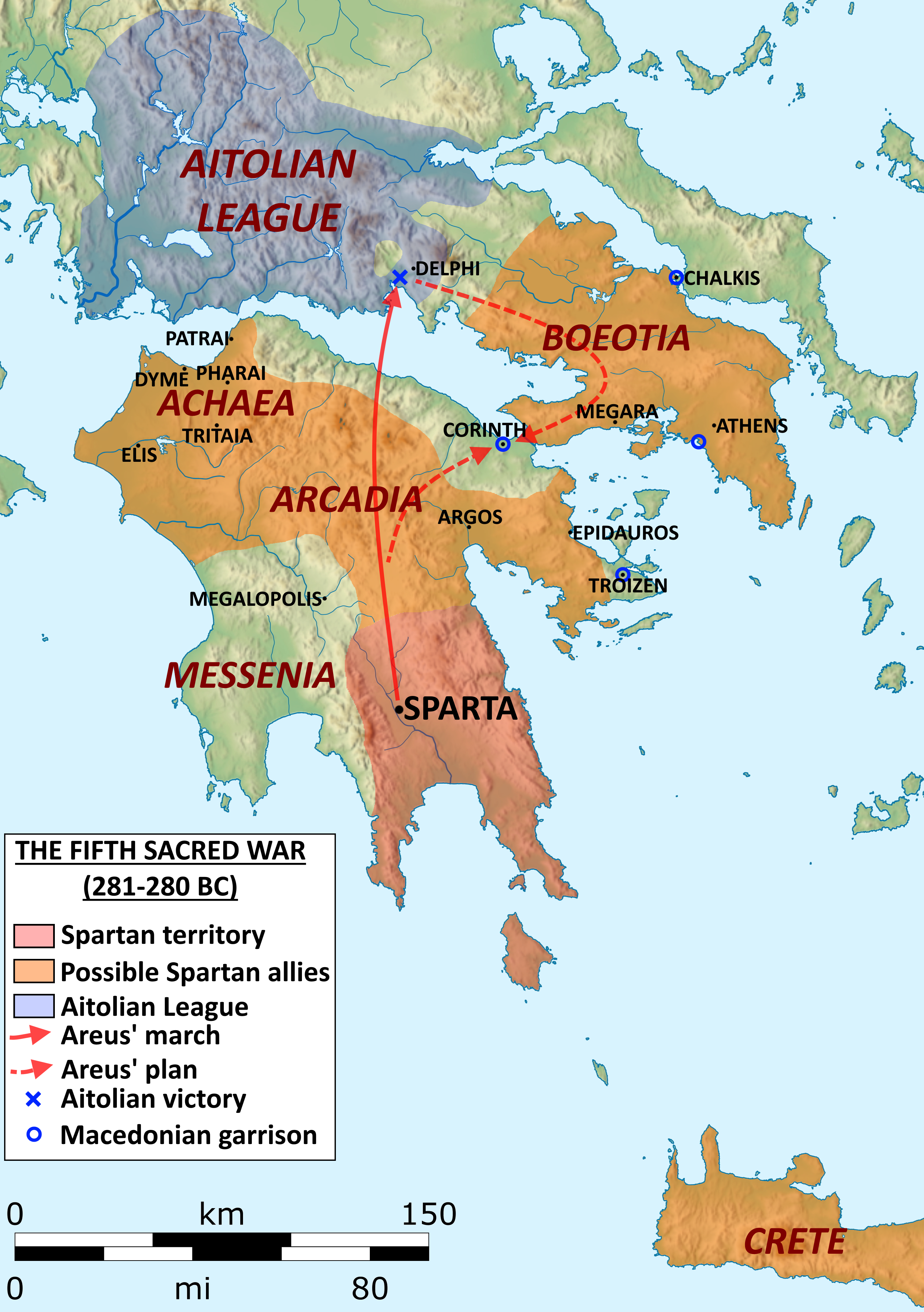
The Fifth Sacred War (281–280 BC), with the hypothetical allies of Sparta, and Areus' plan to take Corinth.

In 281–280, the Wars of the Diadochi—the former generals of Alexander the Great—came to an end with the deaths of Lysimachus, king of Macedonia, and Seleucus, founder of the Seleucid Empire. In Greece, many cities immediately attempted to recover their independence from the new Macedonian king Antigonos Gonatas, and Sparta is found leading allies for the first time since the defeat of Agis III at Megalopolis in 331. Sparta did not frontally attack Macedonia though, targeting instead its weaker ally, the Aitolian League, which had taken control of the Panhellenic sanctuary of Delphi a few years before. Since the Second Sacred War in the 440s, Sparta had assumed the role of Delphi's protector and Areus denounced the profanation of sacred soil by the Aitolians. The attack on the Aitolian League may have been determined by the impossibility of passing through the Isthmus of Corinth, which was heavily garrisoned by Macedonia (in the Acrocorinth fortress); Areus' plan was possibly to win a victory against the Aitolians, then attack Corinth from both the north and south. This war is sometimes called the Fifth Sacred War by modern scholars, named after the other Sacred Wars for the control of Delphi.

Areus was chosen by several other states to lead the alliance against the Aitolians, perhaps because the campaigns of Cleonymus made a good impression, and Sparta was seen as producing capable commanders again. Modern historians however disagree on the extent of this alliance as most of this war is known from Justin, a Roman historian of the 2nd century AD, whose account is very short. The only certain allies of Sparta were the four Achaian cities of Patrai, Tritaia, Dyme and Pharai (which soon after founded the Achaian League), and most of the Arcadians (without Megalopolis), because Areus would not have been able to cross the Peloponnese to Aitolia without their support. Other possible allies were Megara, Boeotia, Argos, Epidauros, Elis, Athens and Western Crete, but the state of evidence is very thin.

Areus then crossed the Corinthian Gulf and landed in the Kirrhan plain, in the southwest of Delphi. Despite posturing as the liberator of Delphi's sacred land, Areus let his soldiers disperse to plunder the area; as a result, the Aitolians inflicted a resounding defeat on Areus' scattered army, although the figures cited by Justin are improbable: he says that 500 Aitolians killed 9000 Spartans and allies. In fact, Areus might have commanded 3,000 men at most. The Spartans likely buried their dead on the spot, either in a polyandrion near Delphi, or in a place called Lakonikon in the Kirrhan plain. The new alliance collapsed following Areus' defeat, likely because his military leadership was by now discredited. Another possibility is that as Antigonos Gonatas was far away campaigning in Asia, the Peloponnesians did not feel threatened enough to stay in the alliance.

=== The defection of Cleonymus (275 BC) ===
After the defeat of Areus, military operations were headed by Cleonymus again. He is recorded in 279 campaigning against Messenia, which prevented them from sending aid to the Aitolians, who were facing an invasion of Gallic tribes. Sparta recovered the border area of Denthaliates, which had been lost after the Battle of Leuctra in 371. Between 279 and 276, Cleonymus took the Macedonian garrison of Troezen in the Argolis and is also mentioned in Crete, acting as peacemaker between the cities of Polyrrennia and Phalasarna. This policy of intervening into Cretan affairs was continued by Areus, as Polyrrennia later built a statue in his honour. The island produced a lot of mercenaries, on which Sparta relied for its operations. Crete was furthermore one of the few places where Sparta could extend its influence without angering any of the big three Hellenistic kingdoms (Macedonian, Ptolemaic, and Seleucid).

Cleonymus was therefore given all the military commands between 279 and 275, probably because he was seen as more capable than Areus following the king's defeat against the Aitolians, a situation that must have concerned Areus. In addition, Plutarch tells that Cleonymus married a much younger woman named Chilonis, who was the daughter of a Leotychidas, a name commonly found in the Eurypontid dynasty, the other royal family of Sparta. As daughters could inherit property in Sparta, Chilonis was a particularly attractive bride, because of her royal descent and wealth. It shows that Cleonymus tried to get closer to the other king, Archidamus IV, and therefore enhance his status within Sparta. However, Areus sent his son Acrotatus to seduce Chilonis in order to thwart the political ambitions of his uncle Cleonymus. In 275, angered Cleonymus left Sparta and went into exile in Epirus, as he had been familiar with its king Pyhrrus since his command in Italy in 303.

=== War against Pyrrhus (272 BC) ===
In 275 Pyrrhus had just come back from Magna Graecia after an unsuccessful expedition against the Roman Republic and Carthage. Plutarch and Pausanias tell that Cleonymus fled to Pyrrhus in order to request his help to become king of Sparta, but this is unlikely, as Pyrrhus' campaign against Sparta only dates from 272. Pyrrhus' first confrontation was instead against Antigonos Gonatas, as he coveted the Macedonian throne, during which he gave Cleonymus the important command of the Epirote phalanx. Clenoymus notably captured Aigai, the historical capital of Macedonia, in 274.

In 272, Pyrrhus assembled a large army of 25,000 foot soldiers, 2,000 cavalry, and 24 elephants, and moved to the Peloponnese. His plan was to take the whole region in order to further weaken Gonatas, while giving Sparta to his friend Cleonymus. The Aitolian League, which had abandoned Gonatas, let him pass through its territory. He likewise received the support of the Achaian League, on the other side of the Corinthian Gulf, as well as Elis, and then settled in Megalopolis, another new ally, where he received embassies from multiple states, notably Argos, which had a strong pro-Pyrrhus faction. Pyrrhus disguised his real intentions to the Spartans, by assuring them that his only ambition was to remove Gonatas' influence from the Peloponnese, and to bring his young sons to Sparta so they could be trained in the Agoge. The Spartans were therefore completely caught off-guard when Pyrrhus attacked them and besieged their city, as Areus was campaigning in Crete, supporting Gortyn in a war against Knossos.

Surprisingly, Sparta received help from Messena. Although its inhabitants had been Spartan helots before the Battle of Leuctra, relationships between the two cities considerably improved during the third century, as evidences show ties between respective aristocrats. Even more unexpected is the help sent by Gonatas, who in fact feared that Pyrrhus would be able to challenge his throne if he took the whole Peloponnese. As a result, thanks to the Macedonian mercenaries headed by Ameinias the Phocian, Pyrrhus had to raise the siege of Sparta. He then ravaged southern Laconia, but retreated to Argos in order to support his faction in the civil war that had just broken out in this city. However, Areus, who had landed in Laconia with a thousand Cretan mercenaries, organised ambushes against Pyrrhus' army; one of which was fatal to Ptolemy, one of Pyrrhus' sons. The final battle took place in Argos, where Pyrrhus was killed during streetfighting against the armies of Areus and Gonatas. Although he had taken the city of Zarax, in the southeastern Peloponnese, Cleonymus had to go into exile after the death of Pyrrhus, likely in Syria.

=== Chremonidean War (267–265 BC) ===
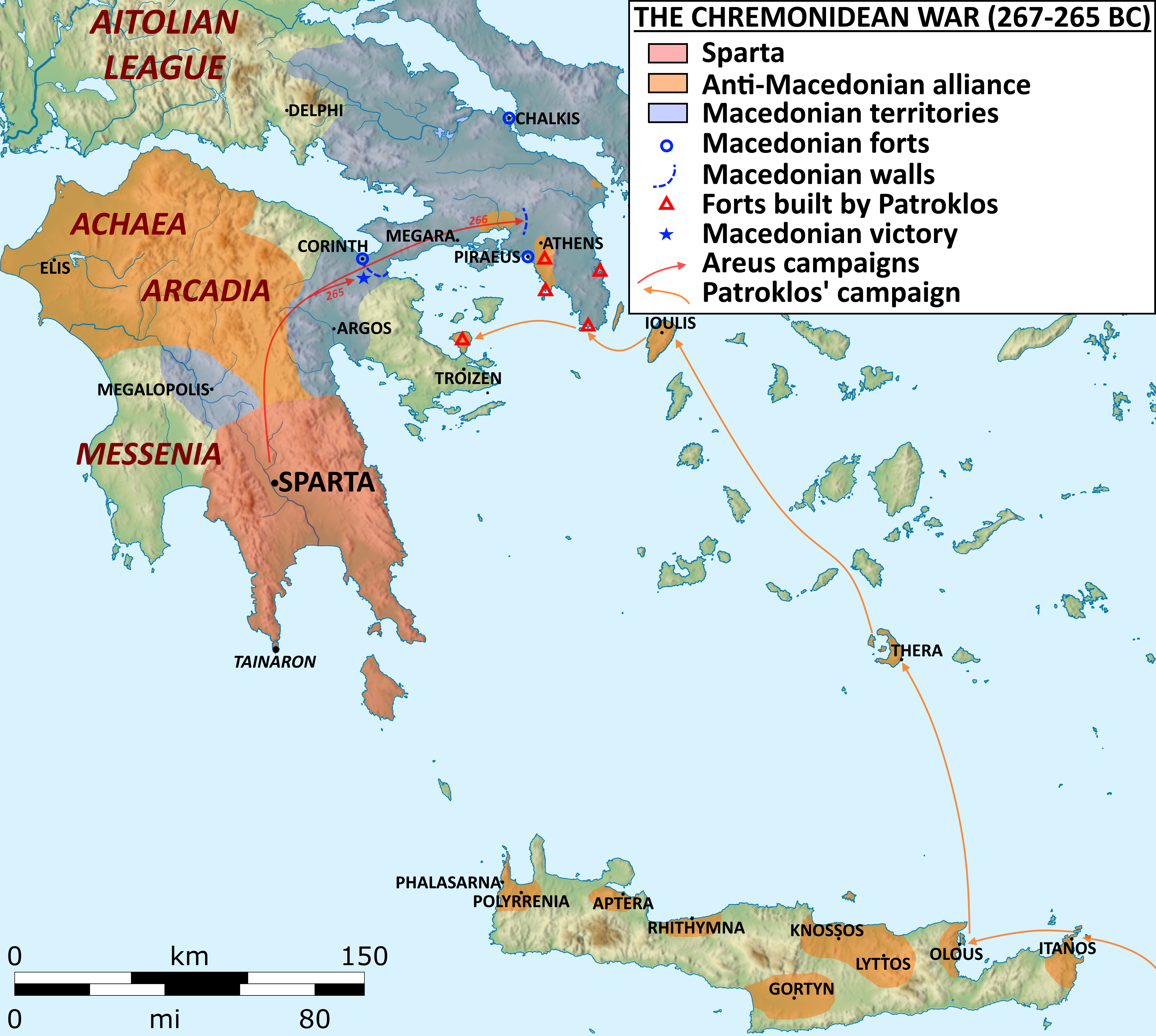
Operations during the first stage of the Chremonidean War (267–265 BC)

The victory against Pyrrhus increased Areus' prestige on the international stage, which turned Sparta into a regional power again. Areus became one of the leaders of a new coalition with Athens directed against Macedonia. As both Athens and Sparta had been allied with Egypt before concluding an alliance between them, it seems that the initiative came from Ptolemy II, who was an enemy of Gonatas and had tried to get a foothold in mainland Greece. Dated from 268 to 267, the text of the Athenian decree sealing the alliance with Sparta is still extent, and is the major source of these otherwise poorly documented events. The Athenian leader behind this alliance was Chremonides—after whom the subsequent war is named—who compared the alliance with Sparta and against Macedonia to the Greek coalition against the Persian emperor Xerxes in 480. Athens had no other ally, but Sparta is described as bringing its own allies into the coalition. Elis, Achaia, and five Arcadian cities (Tegea, Mantineia, Orchomenos, Phigalia, and Kaphyae) are cited; Corinth, Argos, and Megalopolis remained on the side of Gonatas, Messenia was neutral. This set of Spartan allies has been described as a revival of the Peloponnesian League, which used to be the instrument of Sparta's supremacy over southern Greece until its disbandment in 338, although this time Sparta did not dominate its allies. Areus' alliance looked very similar to the alliance set by king Agis III in 331 before the Battle of Megalopolis, showing the enduring support enjoyed by Sparta in the Peloponnese. Areus also counted several allies in Crete: Polyrrenia, Phalasarna, Gortyn, Itanos, Olous, Aptera, Rhithymna, and Lyttos, while Knossos might have joined later. Ptolemy brought his massive fleet to the alliance, as well as military subsidies, which enabled the allies to enlist mercenaries. Areus' army indeed counted numerous mercenaries from his Cretan allies, and from the reopening of the large mercenary market of Tainaron, located on the middle prong of the Peloponnese.

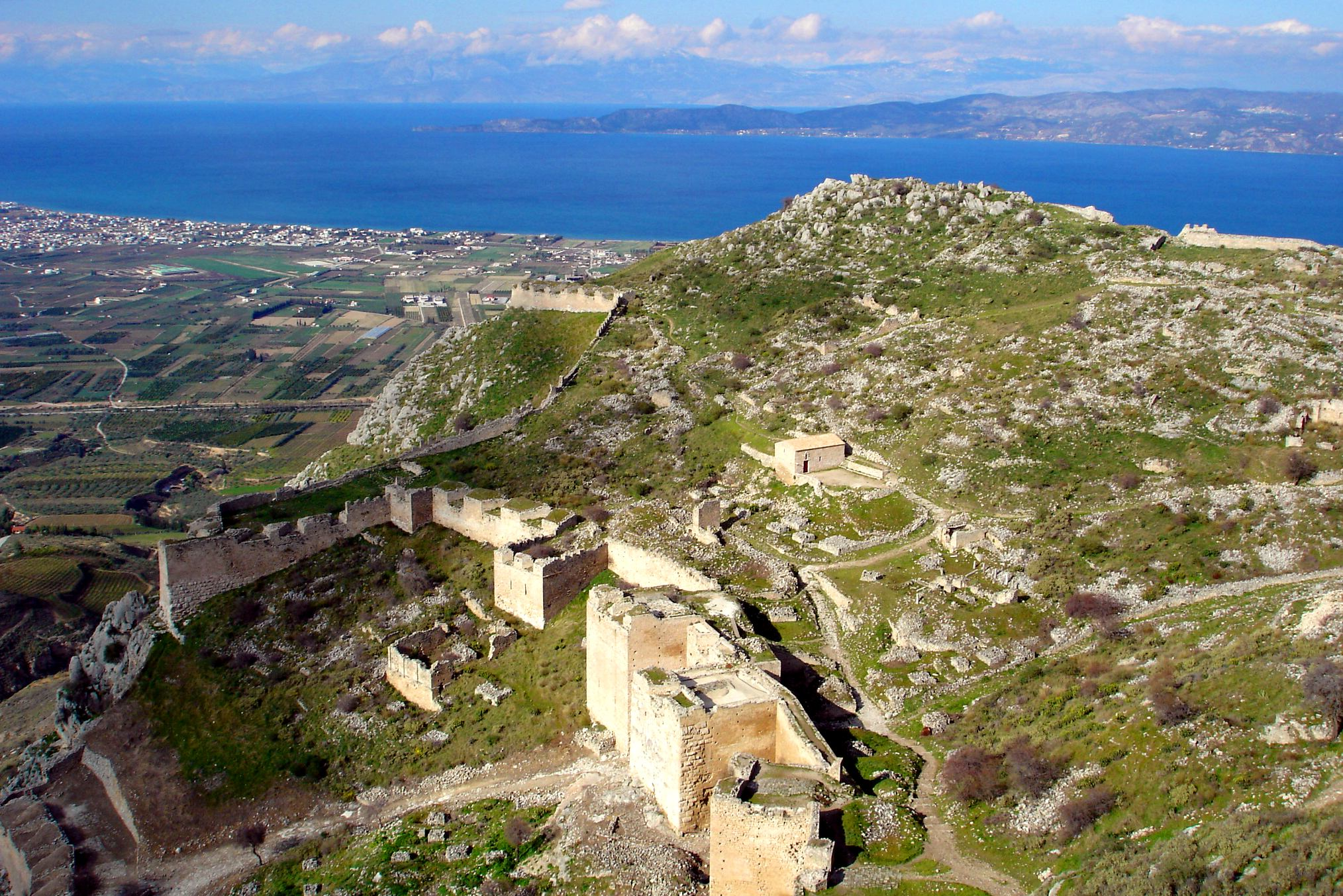
Aerial view of the Acrocorinth fortress, with the Corinthian Gulf in the background. The fortifications date from the Venetian occupation of the area.

The Chremonidean War started in 267–266, but its development is obscure as it is one of the least known wars of Greek history, with only short mentions by Justin and Pausanias. Despite the large number of participants, the anti-Macedonian alliance suffered from the isolation of its individual members, while Gonatas' territories formed one block. Furthermore, Gonatas still had control of the Athenian harbour of Piraeus, which equated to a permanent siege of Athens. Ptolemy helped Athens by sending his admiral Patroklos, but his forces were not sufficient to dislodge Gonatas from Piraeus, although he built several forts on the shore of Attica. The outcome of the war therefore depended on Areus, who apparently passed the Isthmus of Corinth unhindered during the first year of the war, but then could not join with Patroklos because Gonatas had built a wall in Attica to block him. He returned home once his supplies ran out. Gonatas then garrisoned the wall on the Isthmus to prevent Areus from passing through, which he tried to do one or two times (in the years 266–265 and/or 265–264). In about 265, a battle took place near Corinth between the bulk of Gonatas' army and that of Areus, in which the latter was killed, and apparently a lot of his troops as well, because Sparta is not found attacking the isthmus again. Gonatas had not been able to concentrate his troops against Areus the previous year because of a short-lived revolt of his Gallic mercenaries in Megara. Despite the death of Areus, Athens held out until its surrender in 263–262, thus concluding Gonatas' victory.

Areus was succeeded by his son Acrotatus, who died soon after before the walls of Megalopolis, likely in 262.

== A Hellenistic king ==
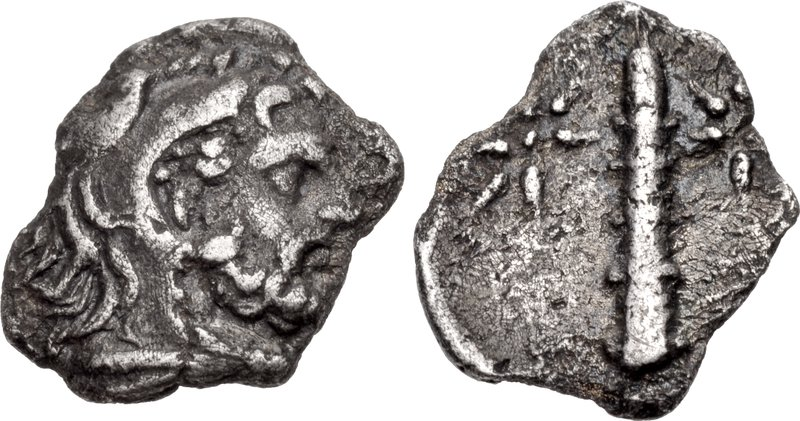
Obol of Areus, minted c. 265 BC. The obverse features the head of Herakles, while there are a club and the stars of the Dioscuri on the reverse. All symbols allude to the ancestry of the Spartan kings.

While the Spartan kingship had been an anachronism in Classical Greece (5th and 4th centuries BC), monarchy became the prevalent form of government during the Hellenistic era. Areus' rule as king shows that he tried to emulate the Hellenistic monarchs, who by now ruled the Greek world, at the expense of the ancestral Spartan constitution written by Lycurgus. Although Sparta was a diarchy, with two kings of equal powers, Areus completely eclipsed the kings of the Eurypontid dynasty. Nothing is known of Areus' co-king Archidamus IV after his defeat against Demetrios Poliorketes in 294, and Archidamus' son Eudamidas II is the most obscure of all the Spartan kings; the dates of their reign are highly conjectural. The Eurypontids were also denied any military command; even when Pyrrhus attacked Sparta while Areus was away, the defence of the city was entrusted to Areus' young son Akrotatus. In the engraved Athenian decree forging the alliance with Sparta before the Chremonidean War, Areus is mentioned by name five times, while his co-king is absent, therefore showing that for the Athenians, Areus was the sole ruler of Sparta.

The most striking feature of this new era is the introduction of coinage in Sparta. The use of coins had been allegedly banned since the time of Lycurgus because money was seen as a source of greed and corruption. Areus' first coins were tetradrachms of the Athenian standard, featuring the head of young Herakles and Zeus seated on a throne, which at the time formed the common imagery on the coins of Alexander the Great and all his successors. The legend reads "King Areus" (Basileos Areos) without mentioning the other king or even the city of Sparta, but is very similar to the coins of the Diadochi. Several dates have been suggested for the production of these tetradrachms, but recent studies support a date at the beginning of the Chremonidean War in order to pay the vast number of mercenaries hired by Areus. They were probably minted outside Sparta, perhaps near Corinth. Areus also produced a second series of smaller coins, which were more likely intended for local circulation within Sparta. These obols feature the head of Herakles and his club, alluding to their ancestry. The Spartan kings were indeed the last of the Heracleidae—the descendants of Herakles—following the extinction of the Argead dynasty of Macedonia in 309 BC, an important source of prestige within the Greek world.

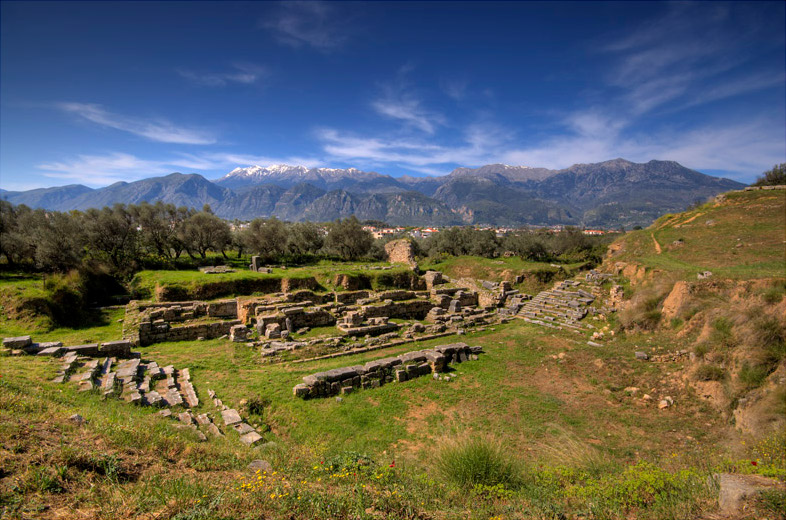
The ancient theatre of Sparta, possibly built under Areus.

Imitating the Ptolemies and Seleucids, Areus furthermore initiated a royal patronage of the arts. c.270 a Spartan comic actor named Nicon won a prize at the Soteria festival in Delphi, which would have been unthinkable in the Classical era, when theatre was held great contempt by the Spartans. Paul Cartledge thinks the first theatre of Sparta was precisely built during his reign. In the 280s or 270s Areus hired the sculptor Eutychides of Sikyon to create an allegory of the Eurotas river, which was praised by Pliny the Elder and perhaps copied as far as Salamis in Cyprus. Eutychides possibly made another statue of Herakles seated and reclining on his mace, because the tyrant Nabis later used this scene typical of Eutychides on his coins. Under Areus, the syssitia—Spartan collective messes—evolved into spectacular banquets. The development of mosaics in Sparta can furthermore be dated from his reign, as they decorated banquet rooms.

Another aspect of Areus' innovativeness was the promotion of his image. He was honoured by an important number of statues, more than any other Spartan king, while a century earlier Agesilaus II had always refused to be portrayed. Pausanias describes three of his statues at the Sanctuary of Olympia. One was dedicated by Ptolemy II and likely placed next to a statue of Ptolemy I and other Diadochi; a second one was an equestrian monument, typical of the new era; the third was dedicated by the city of Elis, another ally of Sparta. Outside Olympia, two statues have also been found in cities allied with Sparta: Arkadian Orchomenos and Polyrrhenia in Crete.

Areus' goals behind this transformation of his role as Spartan king was to picture himself as the peer of the massively more powerful Hellenistic kings. Although he still retained the constitutional framework of Sparta, Areus' enhancement of his kingship dangerously shook the institutional balance in the city, which later lead to the abolition of dyarchy and the reduction the ephorate and Gerousia under Kleomenes III and Nabis.

== Areus and the Jews ==
Areus' letter to the Jews

To Onias, Areus King of the Spartans, greeting.
In a work concerning the Spartans and the Jews
there is a statement that they are brothers and
that they are descended from Abraham.
Now that we have learned this, please be so good
as to write us how you are.
We are ready to write in reply to you, 'Your cattle
and property are ours, and ours are yours.' We
have ordered that you be given a full report on
these matters."

— I Maccabees, translated by Jonathan Goldstein.

Areus makes a surprising appearance in the ancient Jewish literature. The First Book of the Maccabees first reproduces a letter sent by Areus to the High Priest Onias I, then a letter from the High Priest Jonathan c.144, and a third dated c.142 from the Spartans to Simon, Jonathan's successor. Flavius Josephus, a Jewish historian of the 1st century AD, also refers to these letters, which all establish and renew friendship ties between Sparta and Judea.

Both sources describe Areus as a friend of the Jews, who claimed a common ancestry between Jews and Spartans, said to be "brothers" and descendants of Abraham. This puzzling connection between a Greek state and a people subject of Ptolemaic Egypt has attracted considerable attention among modern scholars. Already in 1934 Michael Ginsburg noted that "it is a hard and ungrateful task to wade through the vast literature dealing with this problem". The core of the academic debate is whether the letters reproduced in I Maccabees are forgeries. The growing majority view has been to consider them authentic, with some elaborations from the authors of I Maccabees and Josephus, although the minority—or sceptical—view remains important.

The main argument in favour of the authenticity of Areus' letter is that he was much less famous than other Spartan kings of the Hellenistic era, such as Agis III or Kleomenes III. A forger would presumably have picked a universally known figure. A forger would have also not failed to mention the ephors—the main magistrates at Sparta—while their absence in the letter fits well with Areus' autocratic tendencies. It seems that the letter was originally written in Aramaic; its wording also shows that Areus was well aware of Jewish customs. A Greek writer contemporary of Areus, Hecataeus of Abdera, precisely published a work on the Jews, where he told that the Greek heroes Cadmeus and Danaos were expelled from Egypt at the same time as the Jews. As Danaos was an ancestor of Heracles and therefore the Spartans, it may be the origin for the claim of the kinship between Spartans and Jews. The most common explanation of Areus' claim of such kinship was his need to hire mercenaries, since Jews were known to be good soldiers. The Jewish-Spartan connection was repeated by the High Priest Jason, who attempted to seek shelter to Sparta in 168.

Erich Gruen has been the most vocal critic of the authenticity of Areus' letter. He considers that Areus would have not engaged in independent diplomacy with the Jews, as they were the subjects of his ally Ptolemy II. He adds that Areus would not have needed to highlight his alleged descent from Abraham to hire Jewish mercenaries. The language of the letter is furthermore "suspiciously biblical" ("ours are yours"), which would not have been written by a Greek. Gruen thinks instead that this correspondence is a Jewish invention, which results from the need for them to find their place in the new Hellenistic order that followed the conquest of the Persian Empire by Alexander the Great. He writes that "the Jews attempted to assimilate Greeks into their own tradition", by crafting a kinship with Areus and Sparta, which were still held in high regard by the Greeks of the second century BC, when I Maccabees was written.

== Bibliography ==
=== Ancient sources ===
- Diodorus Siculus, Bibliotheca Historica.
- Justin, Historia Philippicae et Totius Mundi Origines et Terrae Situs.
- Pausanias, Description of Greece.
- Pliny the Elder, Historia Naturalis.
- Plutarch, Moralia, Parallel Lives.

=== Modern sources ===
- Karl Julius Beloch, Grechische Geschichte (2nd edition), Berlin and Leipzig, De Gruyter, 1927.
- Paul Cartledge, Agesilaos and the Crisis of Sparta, Baltimore, Johns Hopkins University Press, 1987. ISBN 978-0715630327
- —— & Antony Spawforth, Hellenistic and Roman Sparta, A tale of two cities, London and New York, Routledge, 2002 (originally published in 1989). ISBN 0-415-26277-1
- Jacqueline Christien, "Iron money in Sparta: myth and history", in Anton Powell and Stephen Hodkinson (editors), Sparta: beyond the mirage, The Classical Press of Wales, Swansea, 2002, pp. 171–190.
- ——, "Areus et le concept de symmachie au IIIe siècle. Les réalités hellénistiques", Dialogues d'histoire ancienne, 2016/Supplement 16, pp. 161–175.
- Paulette Ghiron-Bistagne, Recherches sur les acteurs dans la Grèce antique, Paris, les Belles Lettres, 1976.
- Michael S. Ginsburg, "Sparta and Judaea", Classical Philology, Vol. 29, No. 2 (Apr., 1934), pp. 117–122.
- John D. Grainger, The League of the Aitolians, Leiden, Brill, 1999. ISBN 9004109110
- Denver Graninger, Cult and Koinon in Hellenistic Thessaly, Leiden, Brill, 2011. ISBN 9789004207103
- Christian Habicht, Athens from Alexander to Antony, Harvard University Press, 1997. ISBN 9780674051119
- Jonathan A. Goldstein, The Anchor Bible, I Maccabees, A New Translation, with Introduction and Commentary, New York, 1976. ISBN 0-385-08533-8
- Erich S. Gruen, "The Purported Jewish-Spartan Affiliation", in Robert W. Wallace & Edward M. Harris (editors), Transitions to Empire, Essays in Greco-Roman History, 360–146 B.C., in Honor of E. Badian, University of Oklahoma Press, 1996, pp. 254–269. ISBN 0-8061-2863-1
- ——, "Fact and Fiction: Jewish Legends in a Hellenistic Context", in Paul Cartledge, Peter Garnsey, Erich Gruen (editors), Hellenistic Constructs, Essays in Culture, History, and Historiography, Berkeley, University of California press, 1997, pp. 72–88. ISBN 0520206762
- Hans Hauben, "Callicrates of Samos and Patroclus of Macedon, champions of Ptolemaic thalassocracy", in Kostas Buraselis, Mary Stefanou, Dorothy J. Thompson (editors), The Ptolemies, the sea and the Nile: studies in waterborne power, Cambridge University Press, 2013, pp. 39–65. ISBN 978-1-107-03335-1
- Oliver D. Hoover, Handbook of Coins of the Peloponnesos: Achaia, Phleiasia, Sikyonia, Elis, Triphylia, Messenia, Lakonia, Argolis, and Arkadia, Sixth to First Centuries BC [The Handbook of Greek Coinage Series, Volume 5], Lancaster/London, Classical Numismatic Group, 2011. ISBN 0980238773
- Ioanna Kralli, The Hellenistic Peloponnese: Interstate Relations, A Narrative and Analytic History, from the Fourth Century to 146 BC, Swansea, The Classical Press of Wales, 2017. ISBN 978-1-910589-60-1
- Bernard Legras & Jacqueline Christien, Dialogues d'histoire ancienne Supplément N° 11, Sparte hellénistique, IVe-IIIe siècles avant notre ère, Presses universitaires de Franche-Comté, 2014. ISBN 978-2-84867-493-3
- E. I. McQueen, "The Eurypontid House in Hellenistic Sparta", Historia: Zeitschrift für Alte Geschichte, Bd. 39, H. 2 (1990), pp. 163–181.
- Gabriele Marasco, Sparta agli inizi dell'età ellenistica, il regno di Areo I (309/8-265/4 a.C.), Firenze, 1980.
- Pavel Oliva, Sparta and her Social Problems, Amsterdam, Hakkert, 1972 [translated from the Czechoslovak by Iris Urwin-Lewitova; originally published as Sparta ajeji socialni prolemy, 1971].
- James L. O’Neil, "A re-examination of the Chremonidean War", in Paul McKechnie & Philippe Guillaume (editors), Ptolemy II Philadelphus and his World, Leiden/Boston, Brill, 2008, pp. 65–89. ISBN 978 90 04 17089 6
- Manolis E. Pagkalos, "The coinage of King Areus revisited: use of the past in Spartan coins", Graeco-Latina Brunensia 20, 2015, 2, pp. 145–159.
- Olga Palagia, "Art and Royalty in Sparta of the 3rd Century B.C.", Hesperia: The Journal of the American School of Classical Studies at Athens, Vol. 75, No. 2 (Apr. - Jun., 2006), pp. 205–217.
- Denis Rousset, Le territoire de Delphes et la terre d'Apollon, Athens, Ecole française d'Athènes, 2002. ISBN 9782869581630
- Françoise Ruzé & Jacqueline Christien, Sparte, Histoire, mythe, géographie, Malakoff, Armand Colin, 2017. ISBN 220061814X
- Henri Van Effenterre, La Crète et le monde grec de Platon à Polybe, Paris, 1948.
- D. Alexander Walthall, "Becoming Kings: Spartan Basileia in the Hellenistic Period", in Nino Luraghi (editor), The Splendors and Miseries of Ruling Alone, Encounters with Monarchy from Archaic Greece to the Hellenistic Mediterranean, Franz Steiner Verlag, Stuttgart 2013. ISBN 978-3-515-10259-9
- R. F. Willetts, Aristocratic society in Ancient Crete, London, Routledge and Kegan Paul, 1955.

Preceded by Cleomenes II	Agiad King of Sparta; 309–265 BC	Succeeded by Acrotatus II
