= Aristodemus the Good =

3rd-century BC tyrant of Megalopolis

Aristodemus (Greek: Ἀριστόδημος) was a tyrant of the Greek city of Megalopolis. He was a Phigalian by birth and a son of Artylas, who had been adopted by Tritaeus, an influential citizen of Megalopolis.

He was one of those tyrants who were set up at that time in various parts of Greece by the Macedonian king Antigonus II Gonatas. During his tyranny the territory of Megalopolis was invaded by the Spartans under Acrotatus. Pausanias says this was "Acrotatus I, the eldest son of king Cleomenes", but most probably it was Acrotatus II. The army of Megalopolis had the better of the encounter and Acrotatus was killed, which allows to date the battle to c. 262 BC.

Aristodemus, around the year 252 BC, was assassinated by the "liberator philosophers" Ecdemus and Damophanes, and the city of Megalopolis returned for a few years to democracy.

His sepulchral mound in the neighborhood of Megalopolis was seen by Pausanias in the 2nd century AD.
