= Acrotatus =

Acrotatus can refer to one of two related people in ancient Greek history:

- Acrotatus I, the son of Spartan king Cleomenes II
- Acrotatus II, grandson of the above. Succeeded Areus I as king of Sparta
