= Ameinias =

Ameinias (sometimes spelled Amynias) (Ancient Greek: Ἀμεινίας) is an ancient Greek name which may refer to:

- Ameinias (mythology), a companion and suitor of Narcissus
- Ameinias of Athens or Ameinias of Pallene (5th century BC), a Greek trireme commander in the Battle of Salamis, and younger brother of the playwright Aeschylus
- Ameinias (philosopher) (5th century BC), a Greek philosopher, son of a Pythagorean father named Diochaites and teacher of Parmenides of Elea
- Amynias (also spelled Ameinias) (5th century BC), in 423 BC Eponymous archon in the city of Athens
- Ameinias of Iasus in Caria (4th century BC), the father of Diodorus Cronus
- Ameinias the Phocian (3rd century BC), a Greek "pirate king" and mercenary leader in the service of Antigonus II Gonatas of Macedon
