= Areus II =

King of Sparta from 262 to 254 BC

King of Sparta
- Reign: 262 – 254 BC
- Predecessor: Acrotatus II
- Successor: Leonidas II

Areus II (Ancient Greek: Ἀρεύς Β΄) was Agiad King of Sparta from 262 to 254 BC. He never reigned as he was still a child when he died. He was succeeded by his cousin Leonidas II, who had served as regent.

== Life ==
Areus was the son of Acrotatus (r. 265–262) and Chilonis, who belonged to the Agiad dynasty, one of the two royal families at Sparta (the other being the Eurypontids). He was named after his grandfather Areus I (r. 309–265). His father died early in his reign at the Battle of Megalopolis in 262, towards the end of the Chremonidean War, during which Areus I had likewise fallen in battle three years earlier. Areus II was still a minor at the time, and his cousin Leonidas was appointed regent. Leonidas was the son of Cleonymus, who had also been regent to his nephew Areus I in 309. However, Areus II never reigned as he died still a child in 254, and Leonidas succeeded him (r. 254–235).

Areus II was honoured by a proxeny decree by the city of Delphi in 255/254. This decree shows the transformation of the Spartan kingship in the third century, as the honours received by the infant king are similar to those of the Hellenistic monarchs of the period, whereas Spartan kings usually had a limited role in the Spartan constitution. The decree also mentions Chilonis, Areus' mother, in the manner of the Ptolemaic dynasty of Egypt, which was allied with Sparta at the time and whose court Areus I had tried to emulate.

== Bibliography ==
- D. Alexander Walthall, "Becoming Kings: Spartan Basileia in the Hellenistic Period", in Nino Luraghi (editor), The Splendors and Miseries of Ruling Alone, Encounters with Monarchy from Archaic Greece to the Hellenistic Mediterranean, Franz Steiner Verlag, Stuttgart 2013. ISBN 978-3-515-10259-9

Preceded by Acrotatus II	Agiad King of Sparta; 262–254 BC	Succeeded by Leonidas II
