= Cicysium =

Greek town in ancient Elis

Cicysium or Kikysion (Ancient Greek: Κικύσιον) was the largest of the eight towns of Pisatis in ancient Elis. It is located near the Elean towns of Buprasium and Dymaea, and near Pheraea in Arcadia. Its site is unlocated.
