= Dymaea =

Town of ancient Elis

Dymaea or Dymaia (Ancient Greek: Δυμαία) was a town of ancient Elis, located near the Arcadian border, and near Buprasium and Cicysium. It is unlocated.
