= Agesipolis II =

Agiad king of Sparta from 371 BC to 369 BC

King of Sparta
- Reign: 371 – 369 BC
- Predecessor: Cleombrotus I
- Successor: Cleomenes II
- Died: 369 BC

Agesipolis II (Ancient Greek: Ἀγησίπολις Bʹ; died 369 BC), son of the king Cleombrotus I, succeeded his father and reigned as Agiad King of Sparta. His rule was exceedingly brief; it started in, at most, 371 BC until his death in 369 BC. He was succeeded by his brother Cleomenes II.

Preceded by Cleombrotus I	Agiad King of Sparta; 371–369 BC	Succeeded by Cleomenes II
