= Helenus (son of Pyrrhus) =

- House: Aeacidae
- Father: Pyrrhus I of Epirus
- Mother: Bircenna
- Religion: Ancient Greek religion

Helenus was a prince of Epirus during the Hellenistic period.

== Life ==
He was a son of King Pyrrhus of Epirus and his fourth wife, Bircenna, daughter of Bardylis II of Illyria. Helenus was the youngest of Pyrrhus' sons.

At a very young age he accompanied his father on his ambitious campaign in Italy. It is thought that Pyrrhus, pleased with his successes in Sicily, intended to install his son there as king. However, the tide of fortune changed. When Pyrrhus was forced to abandon both Sicily and Italy, he left Helenus at Taranto, with Milona at the head of the garrison left there, to guard the only city left in his power. Some time later he recalled them to the homeland, because of the new opportunities for expansion that presented themselves in Macedonia and Southern Greece.

Helenus accompanied his father in the campaign he carried out in the Peloponnese in 272 BC. After the fatal night attack on Argos, which cost Pyrrhus his life, Helenus fell into the hands of Antigonus Gonatas, who, however, treated him with magnanimity and the honors befitting his position. He finally sent him safely back to Epirus, where he carried his father's remains.
