= Cleombrotus I =

Agiad King of Sparta from 380 to 371 BC

King of Sparta
- Reign: 380–371 BC
- Predecessor: Agesipolis I
- Successor: Agesipolis II
- Died: 6 July 371 BC; Leuctra, Boeotia
- Issue: Agesipolis II and Cleomenes II
- Greek: Κλεόμβροτος

Cleombrotus I (Greek: Κλεόμβροτος Kleombrotos; died 6 July 371 BC) was a Spartan king of the Agiad line, reigning from 380 BC until 371 BC. Little is known of Cleombrotus' early life. Son of Pausanias, he became king of Sparta after the death of his brother Agesipolis I in 380 BC, and led the allied Spartan-Peloponnesian army against the Thebans under Epaminondas in the Battle of Leuctra. His death and the utter defeat of his army led to the end of Spartan dominance in ancient Greece. Cleombrotus was succeeded by his son Agesipolis II. His other son was Cleomenes II.

Many historians cite Cleombrotus as having pro-Theban tendencies, unlike his fellow king, Agesilaus II. He was blamed for the humiliating defeat at Leuctra by his contemporaries for being biased towards the enemy, though some modern historians do not believe that he was actually pro-Theban. He was the first Spartan king to die in battle since Leonidas at the Battle of Thermopylae.

Preceded by Agesipolis I	Agiad King of Sparta; 380–371 BC	Succeeded by Agesipolis II
