= Chilonis (daughter of Leotychidas) =

3rd-century BC Spartan princess

Chilonis (Greek: Χιλονίς) was a Spartan princess, daughter of Leotychidas, wife of Cleonymus, then Acrotatus, with whom she had Areus II. She is known from Plutarch's "Life of Pyrrhus".

== Biography ==
Her much older husband Cleonymus, a son of Cleomenes II, had not been allowed to succeed to his father's throne because of his violent and tyrannical behaviour, and had spent many years away from Sparta as a soldier of fortune. Chilonis was unfaithful to him with Acrotatus, son of the king Areus I. Areus was away with his army in Gortyn, Crete (272 BC) when Cleonymus attacked his homeland with the help of Pyrrhus of Epirus.

Chilonis preferred death to a return to her husband; in Plutarch's account of the battle, she kept a rope tied around her neck ready to commit suicide in the case of defeat. With the help of their women, the Spartans, led by Acrotatus, were able to withstand the attack, until the return of the king from Gortyn. He was able to defeat Pyrrhus and Cleonymus decisively.

Chilonis and Acrotatus had a child, who later ruled as Areus II, Agiad King of Sparta.
