= The Sacred Wars =

The Sacred Wars can refer to several wars over control of Delphi:

- First Sacred War (595 BC - 585 BC), between the Amphictyonic League of Delphi and the city of Kirrha
- Second Sacred War (449 BC - 448 BC), an indirect confrontation between Athens and Sparta
- Third Sacred War (356 BC - 346 BC), between the forces of Thebes and Phocis for control of Delphi
- Fourth Sacred War (339 BC), between Philip II of Macedon and the city of Amphissa in Lokris
- Fifth Sacred War (281 - 280 BC), between the Aitolian League and the Spartan king Areus I
