= Polyandrion =

Ancient greek burial monument

The polyandrion is the archaeological term for a communal tomb in ancient Greece, where more than one body, usually warriors, are buried.

For the marking of polyandria during the 7th century BCE, in addition to the form of the toumba in Northern Greece, or the Kouros in ancient times, a large stone or marble tombstone was used, like that of the ancient cemetery of Paros, where for at least two centuries there were hero-cults with offerings and sacrifices to the dead, male warriors.

Polyandria of the 5th c. are known in Attica, Central and Northern Greece, but are scarcely associated with extreme historical conditions. An impressive polyandrion is that of ancient Athens, associated with the early years of the Peloponnesian War and the sudden plague that broke out in the city-state.

The sequence of the typology of the monuments ended around 317 BCE following the legislation of Demetrios of Phaleron, who banned the rich sculpture demonstration. Athenian citizens were mentioned either with a monument called a trapeza or with a small pillar. These monuments generally refer to the name of the deceased, the name of his father and the municipality in which the citizen was registered. The simple style of the newer monuments was considered to be an extreme expression of the ideology of isonomia, the fundamental equality of all citizens.
