= Pheraea =

Town in ancient Arcadia

Coordinates: 37°41′49″N 21°47′39″E

Pheraea or Pheraia (Ancient Greek: Φέραια or Φηραία), also Pharaea or Pharaia (Φαραία), was a town in ancient Arcadia. Strabo writes that it was near the border between Arcadia and Elis, and that the cities of Harpina and Cicysium were on the road that went from Olympia to Pheraea.

Pheraea is located at a site in the modern village of Nemouta.
