= Cleomenes II =

King of Sparta from 370 to 309 BC

King of Sparta
- Reign: 370–309 BC
- Predecessor: Agesipolis II
- Successor: Areus I
- Died: 309 BC
- Issue: Acrotatus, Cleonymus
- Greek: Κλεομένης
- Dynasty: Agiad
- Father: Cleombrotus I

Cleomenes II (Ancient Greek: Κλεομένης; died 309 BC) was king of Sparta from 370 to 309 BC. He was the second son of Cleombrotus I, and grandfather of Areus I, who succeeded him. Although he reigned for more than 60 years, his life is completely unknown, apart from a victory at the Pythian Games in 336 BC. Several theories have been suggested by modern historians to explain such inactivity, but none has gained consensus.

== Life and reign ==
Cleomenes was the second son of king Cleombrotus I (r. 380–371), who belonged to the Agiad dynasty, one of the two royal families of Sparta (the other being the Eurypontids). Cleombrotus died fighting Thebes at the famous Battle of Leuctra in 371. His eldest son Agesipolis II succeeded him, but he died soon after in 370. Cleomenes' reign was instead exceptionally long, lasting 60 years and 10 months according to Diodorus of Sicily, a historian of the 1st century BC. (Note: Diodorus, xx. 29.) In a second statement, Diodorus nevertheless tells that Cleomenes II reigned 34 years, (Note: Diodorus, xv. 60 § 5.) but he confused him with his namesake Cleomenes I (r. 524–490).

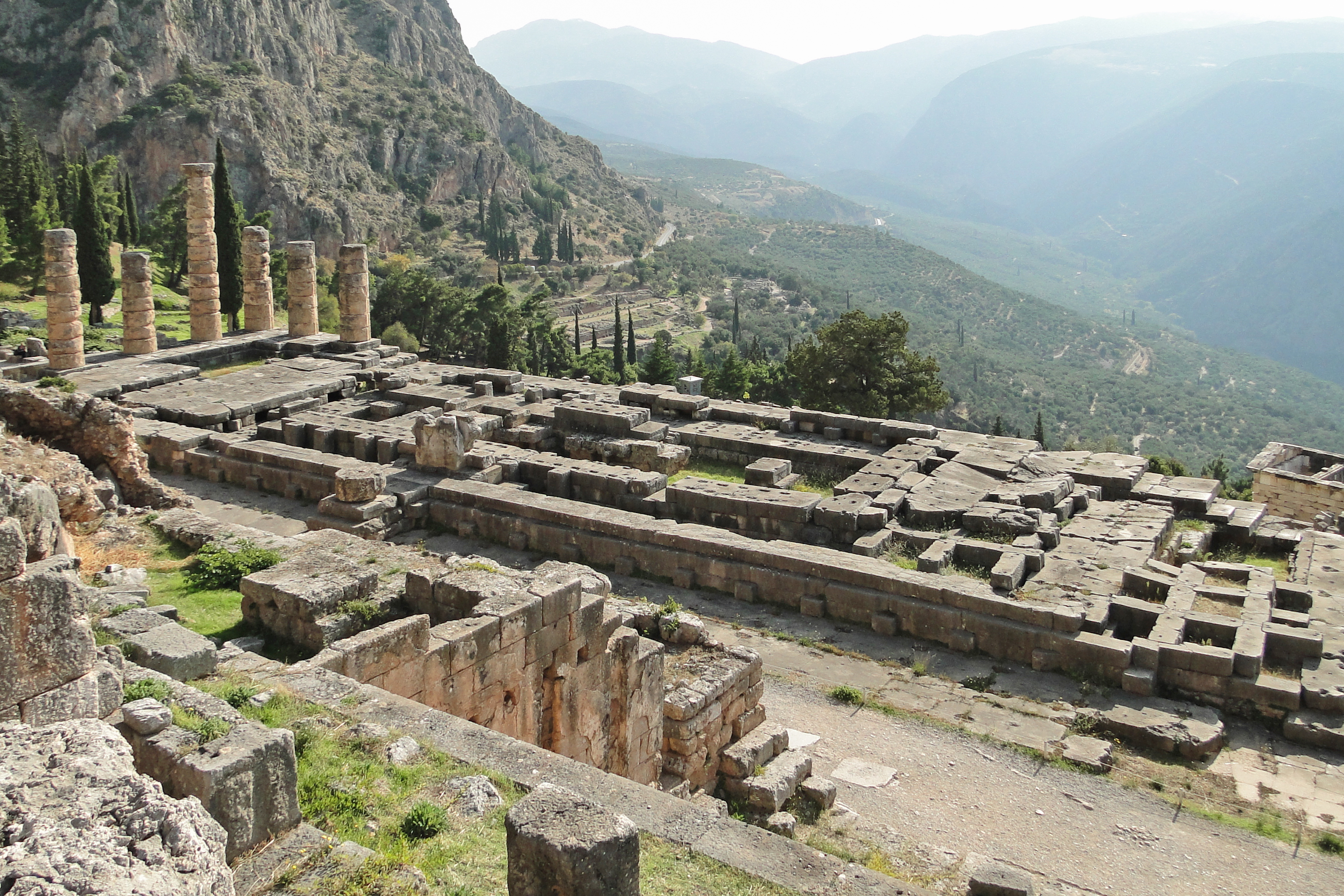
The Temple of Apollo in Delphi.

Despite the outstanding length of his reign, very little can be said about Cleomenes. He has been described by modern historians as a "nonentity". Perhaps that the apparent weakness of Cleomenes inspired the negative opinion of the hereditary kingship at Sparta expressed by Aristotle in his Politics (written between 336 and 322). (Note: Aristotle, Politics, 1271a, 1272b.) However, Cleomenes may have focused on internal politics within Sparta, because military duties were apparently given to the Eurypontids Agesilaus II (r. 400–c.360), Archidamus III (r. 360–338), and Agis III (r. 338–331). As the Spartans notably kept their policies secret from foreign eyes, it would explain the silence of ancient sources on Cleomenes. (Note: Thucydides, v. 68.) Another explanation is that his duties were assumed by his elder son Acrotatus, described as a military leader by Diodorus, who mentions him in the aftermath of the Battle of Megalopolis in 331, and again in 315. (Note: Diodorus, xix. 70, 71.)

Cleomenes' only known deed was his chariot race victory at the Pythian Games in Delphi in 336. In the following autumn, he gave the small sum of 510 drachmas for the reconstruction of the Temple of Apollo at Delphi, which had been destroyed by an earthquake in 373. Cleomenes might have made this gift as a pretext to go to Delphi and engage in informal diplomacy with other Greek states, possibly to discuss the consequences of the recent assassination of the Macedonian king Philip II.

One short witticism of Cleomenes regarding cockfighting is preserved in the Moralia, written by the philosopher Plutarch in the early 2nd century AD: (Note: Plutarch, Moralia, Sayings of the Kings and Commanders, 191.)

Somebody promised to give to Cleomenes cocks that would die fighting, but he retorted, "No, don't, but give me those that kill fighting."

As Acrotatus died before Cleomenes, the latter's grandson Areus I succeeded him while still very young, so Cleomenes' second son Cleonymus acted as regent until Areus' majority. Some modern scholars also give Cleomenes a daughter named Archidamia, who played an important role during Pyrrhus' invasion of the Peloponnese, but the age difference makes it unlikely.

== Bibliography ==
=== Ancient sources ===
- Aristotle, Politics (translation by William Ellis on Wikisource).
- Diodorus Siculus, Bibliotheca Historica.
- Plutarch, Moralia.
- Thucydides, History of the Peloponnesian War (translation by Richard Crawley on Wikisource).

=== Modern sources ===
- Paul Cartledge, Agesilaos and the Crisis of Sparta, Baltimore, Johns Hopkins University Press, 1987. ISBN 978-0715630327
- —— & Antony Spawforth, Hellenistic and Roman Sparta, A tale of two cities, London and New York, Routledge, 2002 (originally published in 1989). ISBN 0-415-26277-1
- —— & Fiona Rose Greenland (editors), Responses to Oliver Stone’s Alexander, Film, History, and Cultural Studies, Madison, The University of Wisconsin Press, 2010. ISBN 978-0-299-23284-9
- Jacqueline Christien, "Areus et le concept de symmachie au IIIe siècle. Les réalités hellénistiques", Dialogues d'histoire ancienne, 2016/Supplement 16, pp. 161–175.
- Ephraim David, "Aristotle and Sparta", Ancient Society, Vol. 13/14 (1982/1983), pp. 67–103.
- Marguerite Deslauriers & Pierre Destrée (editors), The Cambridge Companion to Aristotle's Politics, Cambridge University Press, 2013. ISBN 978-1-107-00468-9
- Charles D. Hamilton, Agesilaus and the Failure of Spartan Hegemony, Ithaca, Cornell University Press, 1991. ISBN 9781501734915
- David Harvey, "The Length of the Reigns of Kleomenes", Historia: Zeitschrift für Alte Geschichte, Bd. 58, H. 3 (2009), pp. 356–357.
- A. R. Meadows, "Pausanias and the Historiography of Classical Sparta", The Classical Quarterly, Vol. 45, No. 1 (1995), pp. 92–113.
- E. I. McQueen, "Some Notes on the Anti-Macedonian Movement in the Peloponnese in 331 B.C.", Historia: Zeitschrift für Alte Geschichte, Bd. 27, H. 1 (1st Qtr., 1978), pp. 40–64.
- ——, "The Eurypontid House in Hellenistic Sparta", Historia: Zeitschrift für Alte Geschichte, Bd. 39, H. 2 (1990), pp. 163–181.
- Paul Poralla & Alfred S. Bradford, Prosopographie der Lakedaimonier, bis auf die Zeit Alexanders des Grossen, Chicago, 1985 (originally published in 1913). OCLC 1151065049

Preceded by Agesipolis II	Agiad King of Sparta; 369–309 BC	Succeeded by Areus I
