= Acrotatus (father of Areus I) =

4th century BC Spartan prince

Acrotatus (Ancient Greek: Ακρότατος) was the son of Cleomenes II, king of Sparta. He incurred the displeasure of an influential group of Spartan citizens by opposing the decree which was to release from infamy all who had fled from the battle in which Antipater defeated Agis in 331 BC. He was thus glad to accept the offer from the Agrigentines who had asked Sparta for assistance in 314 BC against Agathocles of Syracuse.

Acrotatus first sailed to southern Italy where he obtained the support of Tarentum. However, after his arrival at Agrigentum, he behaved with such cruelty and tyranny that the inhabitants rose against him and he was compelled to leave the city.

Acrotatus returned to Sparta where he died before his father, Cleomenes, who died in 309 BC. Acrotatus left a son, Areus I, who succeeded Cleomenes. Acrotatus' grandson, Acrotatus II, succeeded to the Spartan throne after Areus.
