= Buprasium =

Town of ancient Elis

Buprasium or Bouprasion (Ancient Greek: Βουπράσιον) was a town of ancient Elis, and the ancient capital of the Epeii, frequently mentioned by Homer. The town first occurs as providing ships, commanded together with three other zones by captains that are mentioned separately of Nestor in the Iliad in the Catalogue of Ships. The town also features in other passages in the Iliad. In the story in which Nestor narrates a past confrontation between Pylos and the Eleans, the town is described as rich in wheat. In another story, Nestor tells that he participated in the funeral games at Buprasium after the burial of king Amarynceus. It situated near the left bank of the Larissus, and consequently upon the confines of Achaea. The town was no longer extant in the time of Strabo, but its name was still attached to a district on the road from the city of Elis to Dyme on the left bank of the Larissus, which appears from Stephanus of Byzantium to have borne also the name of Buprasius.

Its site is unlocated.
