= Acrotatus (king of Sparta) =

Agiad King of Sparta from 265 to 262 BC

Acrotatus II
- King of Sparta
- Reign: 265–262 BC
- Predecessor: Areus I
- Successor: Areus II
- Died: 262 BC

Acrotatus II (Greek: Ἀκρότατος; died 262 BC) was an Agiad King of Sparta from 265 to 262 BC. He was the son of Areus I, and grandson of Acrotatus I.

He had unlawful intercourse with Chilonis, the young wife of Cleonymus, uncle of his father Areus. It was this, together with the disappointment of not obtaining the throne, which led Cleonymus to invite Pyrrhus to Sparta in 272. Areus was then absent in Crete, and the safety of Sparta was mainly owing to the valor of Acrotatus who successfully held off the Siege of Sparta. He succeeded his father in 265, but was killed shortly thereafter (possibly in the same year) in battle against Aristodemus the Good, the tyrant of Megalopolis. Pausanias, in speaking of his death, calls him the son of Cleonymus, but he has mistaken him for his grandfather, mentioned above. Areus and Acrotatus are accused by Phylarchus of having corrupted the simplicity of Spartan manners. He was succeeded by his son Areus II.

== Notes ==
Preceded by Areus I	Agiad King of Sparta; 265–262 BC	Succeeded by Areus II
