= Cleonymus of Sparta =

Pretender to the Spartan throne, son of Cleomenes II

Cleonymus (Ancient Greek: Κλεώνυμος) was a member of the Spartan royal family of the Agiad dynasty.

== Biography ==
Cleonymus was the second son of Cleomenes II and a pretender to the Spartan throne. He did not succeed his father (died 309/308 BC), allegedly because he was violent and tyrannical. His nephew Areus I became the new king instead. Hence, he nursed a grudge against his fellow Spartans.

In 303 BC the city of Tarentum in Magna Graecia (southern Italy) was at war with both the Lucanians and the Romans. Unable to successfully fight off their opponents, the Tarentines reached out to their mother city, Sparta, for assistance. The Spartans sent Cleonymus and 5,000 mercenaries to assist the Tarentines. There are two different accounts of his Italian expedition; one written by Diodorus Siculus and one by Livy. But the connection between the two sources is unclear. The historian Thomas Lenschau supposes that they describe two different campaigns by Cleonymus: the one described by Diodorus Siculus may have taken place in 303 BC and the one described by Livy in 302 BC.

According to Diodorus Siculus, Cleonymus raised such a large army that the Lucani immediately concluded peace. Then the Spartan prince took the city of Metapontum and sailed to the island of Corcyra, which he quickly captured. Learning that Tarantum and other cities had broken with him, he sailed back and was at first successful, but then he was defeated during a night attack. Since many of his ships were destroyed by a storm at the same time, he had to withdraw to Corcyra (303/302 BC).

Probably in the next year (302 BC) Cleonymus returned to the Italian peninsula and – according to Livy – first conquered a city called Thuriae, the location of which is uncertain, but might be Turi in Apulia. But Romans and their allies forced him back to his ships. He then sailed to the north across the Adriatic Sea and landed on the Veneti coast. From the mouth of the Meduacus (now Brenta River) he sailed upstream to the territory of Patavium (now Padua) and raided the nearby villages. But the local tribes defeated him and he suffered great losses. Allegedly four-fifths of his ships were destroyed forcing Cleonymus to leave Patavium. It is unknown how his campaign ended.

Cleonymus is next mentioned in 293 BC. By then he seems to have returned to Sparta and was then sent to Boeotia to help the inhabitants against Demetrius I Poliorcetes. But when this diadoch arrived with an army, Cleonymus withdrew.

As an older man Cleonymus married the beautiful Chilonis as his second wife. Chilonis was the daughter of Leotychidas, who was a member of the other Spartan royal family of the Eurypontids. However, Chilonis loved Acrotatus II, the grand-nephew of Cleonymus. Deeply offended, Cleonymus left Sparta and, in 272 BC, persuaded Pyrrhus to back his claim to the Spartan throne. Pyrrhus besieged Sparta, confident that he could take the city with ease, however, the Spartans, with even the women taking part in the defence, succeeded in beating off Pyrrhus' attacks. At this point Pyrrhus received an appeal for help from his supporters in Argos which was being attacked by Antigonus Gonatas and he called off the attack. Cleonymus does not appear in the sources after this event.
