= Ptolemy (son of Pyrrhus) =

- military officer
- House: Aeacidae
- Father: Pyrrhus I of Epirus
- Mother: Antigone of Macedon
- Religion: Ancient Greek religion

Ptolemy (295–272 BC) was the oldest son of king Pyrrhus of Epirus and his first wife Antigone, who probably died in childbirth. He was named in honour of his mother's stepfather, king Ptolemy I Soter of Egypt, who was a benefactor to Pyrrhus in his youth.

When Pyrrhus returned from Italy in 274 BC Ptolemy captured the island of Corcyra for his father in an audacious attack with only 60 men. He also distinguished himself in a naval battle, and during the following invasion of Macedonia he dislodged king Antigonus II Gonatas from Thessalonike.

In 272 BC Ptolemy accompanied his father on a military campaign in the Peloponnese, where he commanded his personal guard. During the retreat from Sparta he was attacked by a Lacedaemonian force under Eualcus and slain by the Cretan Oroissus of Aptera. His father avenged his death killing Eualcus, but fell a few days later in the streets of Argos.

Ptolemy had an older sister called Olympias and two younger half-brothers, Alexander and Helenus.

== Sources ==
- Bennett, Chris (2001–2010). "Antigone (Egyptian Royal Genealogy - The Ptolemaic Dynasty)". Tyndale House.
- Plutarch, Pyrrhus
