= Ameinias the Phocian =

Ameinias the Phocian (Ancient Greek: Ἀμεινίας) (flourished 277/272 BC) was an ancient Greek pirate and mercenary leader in the service of king Antigonus II Gonatas of Macedon.

Ameinias was from the region of Phocis in Central Greece. In his early career he had been a pirate captain, but in either 277 or 276 BC Antigonus Gonatas employed him to overcome the cruel tyrant of Cassandreia, Apollodorus, who had resisted a Macedonian siege for ten months.

Ameinias accordingly proceeded to gain the trust of the tyrant, pretending that his role was to reconcile Apollodorus to Antigonus and settle the dispute between them. He also supplied him with provisions and wine and thus convinced him to lower his guard. Meanwhile, Ameinias secretly prepared an army of two thousand men and a group of ten Aetolian pirates under the command of Melatas (or Melotas). Observing that the walls of Cassandreia were thinly guarded, the pirates climbed to the parapet between the towers and fixed the ladders for the two thousand men, who immediately advanced and conquered the city. Ameinias then invited Antigonus to take possession of the conquered city.

In 272 BC, Ameinias was still in the service of the Macedonian king, being attested as the garrison commander of Corinth, who led a mercenary force into the Peloponnese to aid the Spartans against king Pyrrhus of Epirus. A year later Ameinias was probably substituted by a new governor, the historian Craterus.

In 258 BC, a man named Ameinias was archon at Delphi in Phocis, but any connection of this man with the former pirate has not been determined.
