= 190s BC =

This article concerns the period 199 BC – 190 BC.

== Events ==
=== By place ===
==== Roman Republic ====
- The Roman general Gnaeus Baebius Tamphilus attacks the Insubres in Gaul, but loses over 6,700 soldiers in the process.
- Scipio Africanus becomes censor and princeps Senatus (the titular head of the Roman Senate).
- The Roman law, Lex Porcia, is proposed by the tribune P. Porcius Laeca to give Roman citizens in Italy and provinces the right of appeal in capital cases.

==== Egypt ====
- Ancient Egyptian Pharaoh Ankhwennefer succeeds Horwennefer in Upper Egypt, Egypt.

== 198 BC ==
=== By place ===
==== Roman Republic ====
- After his election to the consulship, Titus Quinctius Flamininus is chosen to replace Publius Sulpicius Galba Maximus as the leading Roman general in Macedonia. He then crosses into Macedonia with his army. Flamininus realizes that future peace depends on breaking the power of king Philip V of Macedon, not merely humbling him. He secures the backing of the Achaean League and then opens peace negotiations with Philip at Nicaea in Locris. Though peace proposals are submitted to the Roman Senate, the talks break down, and fighting resumes.
- Titus Quinctius Flamininus' forces manage to push Philip V out of most of Greece, except for a few fortresses. He then defeats Philip V in the Battle of the Aous, near modern Tepelenë in Albania.

==== Seleucid Empire ====
- The Battle of Panium is fought between Seleucid forces led by Antiochus III and Ptolemaic forces led by Scopas of Aetolia. The Seleucids win the battle which allows Antiochus III to obtain entire possession of Palestine and Coele-Syria from King Ptolemy V of Egypt. Though the Romans send ambassadors to Ptolemy V, they are unable to lend him any serious assistance against Antiochus III.
- In the resulting peace, Antiochus III agrees to give his daughter Cleopatra in marriage to Ptolemy V.

==== China ====
- Following the defeat of the Han at the hands of Modu Chanyu of the Xiongnu at Baideng in 200 BC, the soldier and advisor Lou Jing is dispatched by the emperor Gaozu for negotiations. The peace settlement eventually reached between the parties includes a Han princess given in marriage to the chanyu, initiating a policy of heqin or marriage alliances; periodic tribute of silk, liquor and rice to the Xiongnu; equal status between the states; and the Great Wall as the mutual border. This treaty sets the pattern for relations between the Han and the Xiongnu for some sixty years.

== 197 BC ==
=== By place ===
==== Asia Minor ====
- Eumenes II becomes King of Pergamum following the death of his father Attalus I Soter.
- Antiochus III occupies parts of the kingdom of Pergamum and a number of Greek cities in Anatolia.

==== Egypt ====
- The Egyptian King, Ptolemy V, fights rebels in the Nile Delta, exhibiting great cruelty toward those of their leaders who capitulate.

==== Greece ====
- The Spartan ruler, Nabis, acquires the important city of Argos from Philip V of Macedon, as the price of his alliance with the Macedonians. Nabis then defects to the Romans in the expectation of being able to hold on to his conquest.
- The Battle of Cynoscephalae in Thessaly gives a Roman army under proconsul Titus Quinctius Flamininus a decisive victory over Philip V of Macedon. In the Treaty of Tempe, the terms of the peace proposed by the Roman general and adopted by the Roman Senate specify that Philip V can retain his throne and control of Macedonia, but he has to abandon all the Greek cities he has conquered. Philip also has to provide to the Romans 1,000 talents as indemnity, surrender most of his fleet and provide hostages, including his younger son, Demetrius, who is to be held in Rome. The Aetolians propose that Philip V be ejected from his throne but Flamininus opposes this.
- The volcanic island of Hiera emerges from under the sea near Thera.

==== Hispania ====
- Hispania is divided into Hispania Ulterior and Hispania Citerior.
- The Iberian revolt breaks out in Citerior and Ulterior against Roman domination.

==== China ====
- Chen Xi begins a rebellion against the Han dynasty in the Dai region of the northern frontier.

== 196 BC ==
=== By place ===
==== Roman Republic ====
- The Insubres, Gauls of the Po Valley, believed by the Romans to have been incited to revolt by Carthage, are finally defeated.
- A new category of Roman priests, the tresviri epulones, are elected to supervise the feasts of the gods; the first three men selected are Gaius Licinius Lucullus, Publius Manlius, and Publius Porcius Laeca.
- At the Isthmian Games at Corinth, the Roman proconsul Titus Quinctius Flamininus proclaims that all Greeks are to be free and governed by their own laws. For this deed he is hailed in many Greek cities as a saviour and accorded homage alongside the gods.
- Flamininus accuses the Spartan ruler, Nabis, of tyranny, takes Gythium in Laconia and forces Nabis to surrender Argos.
- The first triumphal arch built in Rome.

==== Anatolia ====
- According to the Roman scholar and writer Marcus Terentius Varro, the foundation of a library at Pergamum around this time by Eumenes II of Pergamum, combined with an embargo on papyrus by Ptolemy V, leads to the invention of parchment.

==== Egypt ====
- The Rosetta Stone is created. This stone is a Ptolemaic era stele written with the same text in two Egyptian language scripts (hieroglyphic and demotic) and in classical Greek. The translation of the Greek passage reveals that the inscription is a royal edict recording the benefits conferred on Egypt by the pharaoh Ptolemy V Epiphanes at the time of his coronation. This stone will provide the key to the hieroglyphic, or pictographic writing, of ancient Egypt and the decree on it reveals the increasing influence of Egyptian natives, remitted debts and taxes, released prisoners, pardoned rebels who have surrendered, and granted increased benefactions to the temples.

==== Seleucid Empire ====
- Antiochus III's army crosses the Hellespont into Thrace, where he claims sovereignty over territory that has been won by Seleucus I in 281 BC. A war of harassment and diplomacy with Rome ensues. The Romans send ambassadors demanding that Antiochus stay out of Greece and set free all the autonomous communities in Anatolia. To meet these demands would mean Antiochus III giving up the western part of his Seleucid Empire. Thus Antiochus refuses the Romans' demands.

==== China ====
- Empress Lü and Prime Minister Xiao He of the Han dynasty have the former General-in-Chief Han Xin executed, suspecting that he was planning a rebellion in cooperation with the rebel Chen Xi.
- Emperor Gaozu of Han and his generals, including Cao Shen and Zhou Bo, defeat the rebellion of Chen Xi.
- A Han army defeats a raid on the northern frontier by the rogue Xin of Han. Xin is killed in battle.
- Gaozu deposes the king of Liang, Peng Yue, on suspicion of conspiracy. He is then executed on the orders of Empress Lü.
- The king of Huainan, Ying Bu, fearing execution, rebels against the Han dynasty. Gaozu and Cao Shen crush the rebellion but Gaozu is wounded by an arrow, and his health subsequently deteriorates.
- Increasingly paranoid, Gaozu briefly arrests Prime Minister Xiao He but is persuaded to release him.
- Gaozu sends Zhao Tuo, the king of Nanyue in present-day Vietnam and southern China, a seal recognizing his rulership in return for his nominal submission to the Han. Zhao Tuo accepts his vassal status.

== 195 BC ==
=== By place ===
==== Carthage ====
- Because of his administrative and constitutional reforms in Carthage, Hannibal becomes unpopular with an important faction of the Carthaginian nobility and he is denounced to the Romans for inciting the Seleucid king Antiochus III to take up arms against the Romans. Rome demands that Carthage surrender Hannibal. However, Hannibal voluntarily goes into exile.

==== Seleucid Empire ====
- Tensions between Antiochus III and Rome increase when Hannibal is given refuge by Antiochus III at Ephesus and becomes his adviser.
- After Roman diplomatic intervention, Antiochus III finally halts his war with Egypt. In the peace agreement (the Peace of Lysimachia), Antiochus III formally takes possession of southern Syria, which has been fought over for 100 years by the Ptolemies and Seleucids, and also takes possession of the Egyptian territories in Anatolia.

==== Roman Republic ====
- A Spanish revolt against Roman consolidation of the ex-Carthaginian colonies is effectively put down by Marcus Porcius Cato ("the Censor"). He avoids one defeat by paying the Celtiberians 200 talents (around 120,000 denarii), a much-criticised tactic. On Cato's return to Rome, Aemilius Paulus succeeds him as Roman governor in Spain.
- The Roman sumptuary law, the Lex Oppia, which restricts not only a woman's wealth, but also her display of wealth, is repealed despite consul Marcus Porcius Cato's strong opposition.

==== Greece ====
- The Battle of Gythium is fought between Sparta and a coalition of Rome, Rhodes, the Achaean League and Pergamum. As the port of Gythium is an important Spartan base, the allies decide to capture it before they advance inland to Sparta. The Romans and the Acheans are joined outside the city by the Pergamese and Rhodian fleets. The Spartans hold out; however, the proconsul Titus Quinctius Flamininus arrives with 4,000 extra men. Facing too great an army, the Spartans decide to surrender the city on the condition that the garrison can leave unharmed. As a result, Nabis, the tyrant of Sparta, is forced to abandon the surrounding land and withdraw to the city of Sparta. Later that year, Sparta capitulates to the allies.

==== Egypt ====
- Aristophanes of Byzantium, Greek scholar, critic and grammarian, becomes the chief librarian at Alexandria.

==== China ====
- Facing the suspicion of Emperor Gaozu of Han, Lu Wan, the king of the State of Yan, flees north of the Great Wall of China.
- Gaozu sends general Fan Kuai to seek out Lu Wan but then arrests the general on suspicion of planning to murder Consort Qi and her son to Gaozu, Liu Ruyi. Gaozu dies soon after, and Fan's sister-in-law Empress Lü orders his release.
- Chang'an, the capital of China, is thought to become the largest city in the world at this time, taking over from Pataliputra, the capital of the Mauryan empire.

==== Korea ====
- Haemosu Dangun, the first ruler of Buyeo, dies and his son Mosuri Dangun succeeds him to the throne.

== 194 BC ==
=== By place ===
==== Greece ====
- After checking the ambitions of Nabis, the tyrant of Sparta, the Roman forces under proconsul Titus Quinctius Flamininus finally withdraw from Greece.
- With the Roman legions under Flaminius returning to Italy, the Greek states are once again on their own. The Romans leave the dominant powers in the region; the kingdom of Macedonia, the Aetolians, the strengthened Achaean League and the weakened Sparta. The Aetolians, who have opposed the Roman intervention in Greek affairs, incite the Spartan leader, Nabis, to retake his former territories and regain his influence in Greek affairs.

==== Seleucid Empire ====
- With his peace agreement with the Egyptians in place, Antiochus III now turns his attention to the West. He is encouraged to challenge Rome's protection of the Greeks by his advisor, the former Carthaginian general Hannibal.
- Philip V of Macedon, along with Rhodes, Pergamum, and the Achaean League, join Rome against Antiochus III.

==== Roman Republic ====
- The Battle of Mutina is fought between the Romans and the Boii (a Gallic tribe). The Romans are victorious in the battle which effectively ends the threat of the Gauls in Italy.
- The Italian towns of Liternum and Puteoli become Roman colonies.

==== China ====
- The construction of the first city wall of Chang'an begins.
- Empress Lü protects the accession of her son Emperor Hui by executing Consort Qi and her son to Gaozu, Liu Ruyi.

==== Korea ====
- The Wiman Joseon kingdom of northern Korea (Choson) is founded by the Chinese Han dynasty general Wiman.

== 193 BC ==
=== By place ===
==== Greece ====
- Eumenes II of Pergamum appeals to Rome for help against the Seleucid king Antiochus III who is threatening to conquer Greece. The Roman proconsul Titus Quinctius Flamininus supports the Roman championship of Greek autonomy in Anatolia.
- Flamininus is sent to negotiate with Antiochus III and warns him not to interfere with the Greek states. Antiochus does not accept that Flamininus has the authority to speak for the Greeks and promises to leave Greece alone only if the Romans do the same.
- Flamininus attempts to rally the Greeks against Antiochus III and to counter the pro-Seleucid policy of the Aetolians. When the Aetolians call on Antiochus III for aid, Flamininus persuades the Achaean League to declare war on both parties. He also prevents Philopoemen from taking Sparta.
- In the meantime, the Spartan ruler, Nabis, moves to recover lost territory, including Gythium.
- Carneades of Cyrene moves to Athens to found the third or new Academy.

==== Rome ====
- The first porticos were built in Rome.

==== Egypt ====
- Cleopatra I Syra, daughter of Antiochus III and Laodice, marries the Egyptian King Ptolemy V Epiphanes.

== 192 BC ==
=== By place ===
==== Greece ====
- The Achaeans respond to Sparta's renewed interest in recovering lost territory by sending an envoy to Rome with a request for help. In response, the Roman Senate sends the praetor Atilius with a navy, as well as an embassy headed by Titus Quinctius Flamininus.
- Not waiting for the Roman fleet to arrive, the Achaean army and navy head towards Gythium under the command of Philopoemen. The Achaean fleet under Tiso is defeated by the Spartan fleet. On land, the Achaeans are unable to defeat the Spartan forces outside Gythium and Philopoemen retreats to Tegea.
- When Philopoemen reenters Laconia for a second attempt, his forces are ambushed by the Spartan tyrant, Nabis, but nevertheless Philopoemen manages to gain a victory over the Spartan forces.
- Philopoemen's plans for capturing Sparta itself are put on hold at the request of the Roman envoy Flaminius after his arrival in Greece. In return, Nabis decides, for the moment, to accept the status quo.
- Nabis then appeals to the Aetolians for help. They send 1,000 cavalry under the command of Alexamenus to Sparta. However, the Aetolians murder Nabis and temporarily occupy Sparta. The Aetolian troops seize the palace and set about looting the city, but the inhabitants of Sparta are able to rally and force them leave the city. Philopoemen, however, takes advantage of the Aetolian treachery and enters Sparta with his Achaean army. Now in full control of Sparta, Philopoemen forces Sparta to become a member state of the Achaean League.
- Seleucid forces under their king, Antiochus III, invade Greece at the invitation of the Aetolian League, who are revolting against the Romans. The Aetolians appoint him commander in chief of their league. Antiochus lands in Demetrias, Thessaly with only 10,500 men and occupies Euboea. However, he finds little support for his cause in central Greece.

== 191 BC ==
=== By place ===
==== Roman Republic ====
- The Romans under Manius Acilius Glabrio and Cato the Elder cut the Seleucid king Antiochus III off from his reinforcements in Thrace and outflank his position at the pass of Thermopylae in the Battle of Thermopylae. With the remainder of his troops, Antiochus flees to Chalcis on Euboea and from there he retreats by sea to Ephesus.
- Manius Acilius Glabrio then turns his attention to the Aetolian League, which has persuaded Antiochus to declare war against Rome, and is only prevented from crushing them by the intercession of Titus Quinctius Flamininus.
- Scipio Africanus persuades the Roman Senate to continue the war against Antiochus III by making him the chief commander and allowing him and his brother, Lucius Cornelius Scipio Asiaticus, to follow Antiochus into Anatolia.
- The Roman calendar, which is four months ahead of the seasons, is adjusted (by Lex Acilia de intercalando).
- Cisalpine Gaul becomes a Roman province.

==== Carthage ====
- The Carthaginians manage to collect the indemnity due to Rome (through the peace treaty signed between them ten years earlier) but not payable in full for 50 years. The Romans, in order to keep their hold on Carthage, refuse to accept the early payment of the indemnity.

==== Parthia ====
- Arsaces II, king of Parthia is succeeded by his cousin Phriapatius.

==== China ====
- Emperor Hui of Han lifts the ban on Confucian writings ordered in 213 BC.

== 190 BC ==
=== By place ===
==== Greece ====
- The Battle of the Eurymedon is fought between a Seleucid fleet and ships from Rhodes and Pergamum, who are allied with the Roman Republic. The Seleucids are led by the famous Carthaginian general Hannibal. The Rhodians and their allies are victorious and Hannibal's fleet is forced to flee.
- Subsequently, the naval Battle of Myonessus is fought between a Seleucid fleet and a Roman fleet with the help of Rhodian ships. The Romans and their allies are victorious.
- As Philip V of Macedon has aided Rome against her enemies on the Greek peninsula, his tribute to Rome is remitted and his son, Demetrius, is restored to him after being held hostage in Rome for a number of years.

==== Seleucid Empire ====
- Meeting no further resistance from the Seleucids and their allies, the Roman army under general Scipio Africanus and his brother Lucius, along with King Eumenes II of Pergamum and other allies, cross the Hellespont into Anatolia.
- With the increasingly real threat to his Empire from the Romans, Antiochus III is eager to negotiate on the basis of Rome's previous demands, but the Romans insist that he first give up the region west of the Taurus Mountains. When Antiochus refuses, the Battle of Magnesia is fought near Magnesia ad Sipylum, on the plains of Lydia in Anatolia, between the Romans, led by the consul Lucius Cornelius Scipio and his brother, Scipio Africanus, with their ally Eumenes II of Pergamum, and the army of Antiochus III the Great of the Seleucid Empire. The resulting decisive Roman victory ends the conflict with the Seleucids for the control of Greece.
- Following Antiochus III's defeat by the Romans, two of Antiochus III's Armenian satraps, Artaxias and Zariadres, declare themselves independent of the Seleucids. With Roman consent, they establish themselves as kings of the Kingdom of Armenia and the district of Sophene (Armenia Minor), respectively. Artaxias builds his capital, Artaxata, on the Araxes River (now the Aras River) near Lake Sevan.
- For assisting the Romans in defeating Antiochus III, Eumenes II of Pergamum is rewarded with a great increase in territory. He is given control over the Thracian Chersonese (the modern Gallipoli peninsula) and over most of the former Seleucid possessions in Anatolia.

==== Roman Republic ====
- One of the main highways in Roman Italy, the Via Appia, is extended to Benevento and Venosa.

=== By topic ===
==== Art ====
- The statue Nike (Victory) of Samothrace is created (possible date). It is discovered in 1863 and is now kept at Musée du Louvre in Paris.

== Births ==
195 BC

- Mithridates I (or Mithradates), "Great King" of Parthia from about 171 BC who turned Parthia into a major political power and expanded the empire westward into Mesopotamia (d. 138 BC)
- Terence or Publius Terentius Afer, Roman comic playwright (approximate date) (d. 159 BC)

190 BC

- Cornelia, second daughter of Scipio Africanus. She will be considered by Roman society to be the perfect example of a virtuous Roman woman (d. 100 BC)
- Hipparchus, Greek astronomer, geographer, and mathematician (d. c. 120 BC)
- Judah Maccabeus (who then became a leader of the Maccabees) (d. c. 160 BC)

== Deaths ==
197 BC

- Attalus I Soter, ruler of Pergamum from 241 BC, who has taken on the title of king after about 230 BC. Through his military and diplomatic skills, he has created a powerful kingdom in Anatolia (b. 269 BC)
- Liu Taigong, Chinese emperor of the Han dynasty

196 BC

- Han Xin, Chinese general during the Chu–Han Contention
- Marcus Cornelius Cethegus, Roman consul and censor
- Peng Yue, Chinese general of the Western Han dynasty
- Xin, Chinese king during the Warring States period

195 BC

- June 1 – Gaozu of Han (or Gao), first emperor of the Chinese Han dynasty, who has ruled since 202 BC (b. 256 or 247 BC)

194 BC

- Eratosthenes, Greek mathematician, geographer and astronomer (b. 276 BC)
- Concubine Qi, also known as Lady Qi or Consort Qi, favoured concubine of Han Gaozu (personal name Liu Bang), the first emperor of the Chinese Han dynasty

193 BC

- Xiao He, prime minister of the early Han dynasty in China who has been a key figure in Liu Bang's rise to power after the fall of the Qin dynasty

192 BC

- Nabis, tyrant and last independent ruler (from 207 BC) of Sparta
- Xiang Bo, Chinese nobleman of the Chu State (Seven Kingdoms)

191 BC

- Arsaces II, King of Parthia, who had reigned from about 211 BC

190 BC

- Apollonius of Perga, Greek mathematician, geometer and astronomer of the Alexandrian school, known by his contemporaries as "The Great Geometer", whose treatise "Conics" is one of the greatest scientific works from the ancient world (b. c. 262 BC)
