= Hejian Kingdom =

Kingdom in Imperial China,178 BC – 221 AD

Hejian Kingdom, also translated as Hejian Principality (Chinese: 河間國), was a kingdom in early Imperial China, located in present-day southern Hebei province.

== History ==
In early Han dynasty, Hejian was part of the Zhao Kingdom. The kingdom was created in 178 BC when it was granted to Liu Piqiang (劉辟彊), son of Liu You, King You of Zhao (趙幽王) and brother of Liu Sui, King of Zhao. After Piqiang's death, the territory passed to his son Liu Fu (劉福). Fu died without an heir and the kingdom was dissolved.

In 155 BC, Emperor Jing granted the title King of Hejian to Liu De (劉德), his third son. De's descendants held the title to the end of Western Han dynasty. The kingdom was briefly restored under Emperor Guangwu's reign.

In 90 AD, Emperor Zhang reestablished Hejian on the territories of Lecheng, Bohai and Zhuo commanderies. Liu Kai (劉開), the sixth son of the emperor, became the King of Hejian. Kai's lineage held Hejian until the foundation of Cao Wei dynasty. Emperor Huan and his successors all came from this branch of the imperial family.

Hejian became a commandery under Cao Wei. In early Western Jin dynasty, Hejian became the fief of Sima Yong, brother of Sima Yi.

In 140 AD, the kingdom administered 11 counties, namely Lecheng (樂成), Gonggao (弓高), Yi (易), Wuyuan (武垣), Zhongshui (中水), Mao (鄚), Gaoyang (高陽), Wen'an (文安), Shuzhou (束州), Chengping (成平) and Dongpingshu (東平舒). The total population was 634,421, or 93,754 households.

== Kings under the Han dynasty ==
- Liu Piqiang (劉辟疆), King Wen of Hejian (河間文王), 178–165 BC;
- Liu Fu (劉福), King Ai of Hejian (河間哀王), 165–164 BC;
- Liu De (劉德), King Xian of Hejian (河間獻王), 155–129 BC;
- Liu Buzhou (劉不周), King Gong of Hejian (河間共王), 129–125 BC;
- Liu Ji (劉基), King Gang of Hejian (河間剛王), 125–113 BC;
- Liu Huan (劉緩), King Qing of Hejian (河間頃王), 113–97 BC;
- Liu Qing (劉慶), King Xiao of Hejian (河間孝王), 97–54 BC;
- Liu Yuan (劉元), 54–37 BC;
- Liu Liang (劉良), King Hui of Hejian (河間惠王), 32–5 BC;
- Liu Shang (劉尚), 5 BC – 9 AD;
- Liu Shao (劉劭), 32–37;
- Liu Kai (劉開), King Xiao of Hejian (河間孝王), 90–132;
- Liu Zheng (劉政), King Hui of Hejian (河間惠王), 132–142;
- Liu Jian (劉建), King Zhen of Hejian (河間貞王), 142–152;
- Liu Li (劉利), King An of Hejian (河間安王), 152–180;
- Liu Gai (劉陔), 180–221.
