= 207 BC =

207 BC in various calendars
Gregorian calendar	207 BC; CCVII BC
Ab urbe condita	547
Ancient Egypt era	XXXIII dynasty, 117
Pharaoh	Ptolemy IV Philopator, 15
Ancient Greek Olympiad (summer)	143rd Olympiad, year 2
Assyrian calendar	4544
Balinese saka calendar	N/A
Bengali calendar	−800 – −799
Berber calendar	744
Buddhist calendar	338
Burmese calendar	−844
Byzantine calendar	5302–5303
Chinese calendar	癸巳年 (Water Snake); 2491 or 2284 — to — 甲午年 (Wood Horse); 2492 or 2285
Coptic calendar	−490 – −489
Discordian calendar	960
Ethiopian calendar	−214 – −213
Hebrew calendar	3554–3555
- Hindu calendars
Vikram Samvat	−150 – −149
Shaka Samvat	N/A
Kali Yuga	2894–2895
Holocene calendar	9794
Iranian calendar	828 BP – 827 BP
Islamic calendar	853 BH – 852 BH
Javanese calendar	N/A
Julian calendar	N/A
Korean calendar	2127
Minguo calendar	2118 before ROC 民前2118年
Nanakshahi calendar	−1674
Seleucid era	105/106 AG
Thai solar calendar	336–337
Tibetan calendar	阴水蛇年 (female Water-Snake) −80 or −461 or −1233 — to — 阳木马年 (male Wood-Horse) −79 or −460 or −1232

Year 207 BC was a year of the pre-Julian Roman calendar. At the time it was known as the Year of the Consulship of Nero and Salinator (or, less frequently, year 547 Ab urbe condita). The denomination 207 BC for this year has been used since the early medieval period, when the Anno Domini calendar era became the prevalent method in Europe for naming years.

== Events ==
=== By place ===
==== Roman Republic ====
- The Roman consul Gaius Claudius Nero fights an indecisive battle with the Carthaginian general Hannibal at Grumentum. Nero is unable to stop Hannibal's advance into Canusium. Nevertheless, he rapidly marches the elite parts of his army some one hundred kilometres north to reinforce the army of Marcus Livius Salinator.
- The Battle of the Metaurus, fought near the Metaurus River in Umbria, is a pivotal battle during the Second Punic War between Rome and Carthage. The Carthaginians are led by Hannibal's brother Hasdrubal Barca, and the Roman armies are led by the consuls Marcus Livius Salinator and Gaius Claudius Nero. The Carthaginian army is defeated by the Romans and Hasdrubal is killed in the battle. This major loss by the Carthaginians ends Hannibal's hopes of success in Italy.

==== Greece ====
- The general leading the Achaean League, Philopoemen, introduces heavier Macedonian armour and phalanx tactics. His army then crushes the Spartans under the Spartan regent and general, Machanidas, in the battle of Mantinea. Machanidas is killed by Philopoemen during the battle.
- Nabis, a Syrian sold into slavery, rises to power in Sparta and becomes regent of the young Spartan king, Pelops, following the death of Machanidas. Nabis soon overthrows Pelops, claiming to be a descendant of the Eurypontid Spartan king Demaratus. Nabis then starts a social revolution which will lead to the freeing of all the helots, the destruction of the ruling oligarchy, the redistribution of land and the cancelling of debts.

==== Vietnam ====
- When king An Dương Vương dies, so does his dynasty and the Triệu dynasty and the kingdom of Nam Việt are established.

==== China ====
- The Chu rebel Xiang Yu defeats the Qin general Zhang Han in the Battle of Julu and becomes the leader of the rebellion against the Qin dynasty.
- Xiang Yu defeats Zhang Han in the Battle of the Yushui River. Zhang Han then surrenders to Xiang Yu.
- Emperor Qin Er Shi of the Qin dynasty is assassinated by Prime Minister Zhao Gao. He is replaced by his nephew Ziying, who in turn assassinates Zhao Gao. Ziying takes power as the king of Qin rather than as emperor.
- The Chu rebel Liu Bang invades Guanzhong. After another military defeat, Ziying surrenders to Liu, who then occupies the Qin capital Xianyang. This marks the end of the Qin dynasty.

== Deaths ==
- June 22 – Hasdrubal Barca, Carthaginian general in the Second Punic War (b. 245 BC)
- date unknown
  - An Dương Vương, King of Nam Việt since 257 BC
  - Chrysippus, Greek philosopher from Soloi who was the principal systematiser of Stoic philosophy (b. c. 280 BC)
  - Hasdrubal Barca, Carthaginian general who has unsuccessfully attempted to sustain Carthage's military ascendancy on the Spanish peninsula in the face of Roman attacks (b. 245 BC)
  - Machanidas, Spartan general and regent (killed in the battle of Mantinea)
  - Qin Er Shi, Emperor of the Qin dynasty of China (assassinated) (b. 229 BC)
  - Simuka, Indian king from 230 BC and the founder of the Satavahana dynasty (b. 230 BC)
  - Zhao Gao, Chief eunuch in the service of the Emperors of the Qin dynasty of China (assassinated)
