= Apega =

Apega may refer to:

- Apega of Sparta, wife of the Spartan tyrant Nabis, who also acted as his co-ruler
- Apega of Nabis, an ancient torture device invented and used by Nabis, said to be modelled after Queen Apega
- Association of Professional Engineers and Geoscientists of Alberta (APEGA), a Canadian engineering society
