= Siege of Gythium =

Part of War against Nabis

- Part of War against Nabis
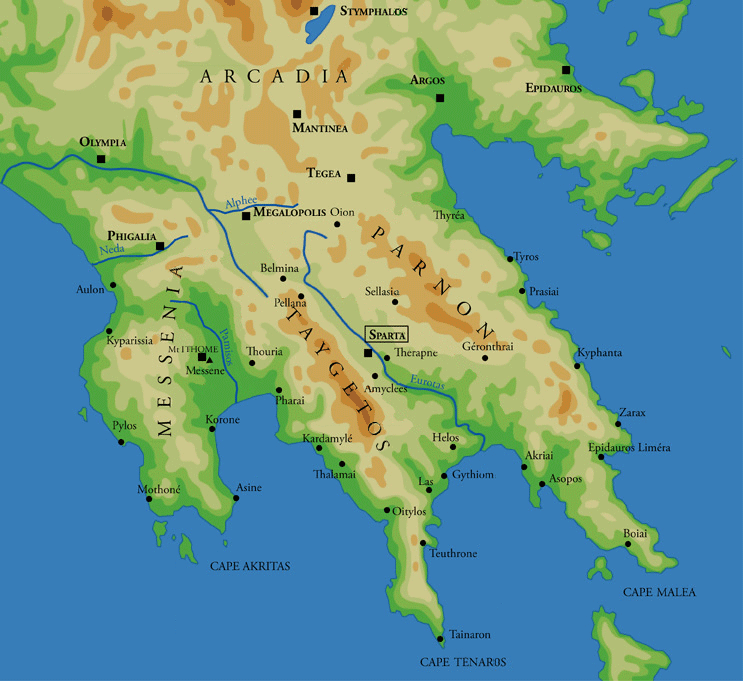
- A map of the southern Peloponnese.
Date	195 BC
Location	Gytheio in Mani, Laconia, Greece.
Result	Allied Victory

Belligerents
Roman Republic; Achaean League; Rhodes; Pergamum; Macedon	Sparta

Commanders and leaders
Titus Quinctius Flamininus; Eumenes II of Pergamum	Dexagoridas †; Gorgopas

Strength
About 50,000 men	

The siege of Gythium was fought in 195 BC between Sparta and the coalition of Rome, Rhodes, the Achaean League, and Pergamum. As the port of Gythium was an important Spartan base, the allies decided to capture it before they advanced inland to Sparta. The Romans and the Achaeans were joined outside the city by the Pergamese and Rhodian fleets. The Spartans held out, but one of the joint commanders, Dexagoridas, decided to surrender the city to the Roman legate. When Gorgopas, the other commander, found out, he killed Dexagoridas and took sole command of the city. After Dexagoridas' murder, the Spartans held out more vigorously. However, Titus Quinctius Flamininus of the allied forces arrived with 4,000 more men and the Spartans decided to surrender the city on the condition that the garrison could leave unharmed. The result of this siege forced Nabis, the tyrant of Sparta, to abandon the surrounding land and withdraw to the city of Sparta. Later that year, Sparta capitulated to the allies.

== Prelude ==
The Macedonians had been defeated in the Second Macedonian War in 197 BC which left the Spartans in control of Argos. This Spartan gain was a setback for the Achaean League who had been trying to incorporate Sparta into their league for many years. The Romans had won the Second Macedonian War and it left them in control of Greek affairs. However, they decided not to occupy Greece but to garrison some cities for five years. The tyrant of Sparta, Nabis, who had declared himself king, was troubling the Achaean League and was also threatening to destroy the peace in Greece.

In 195 BC, Flamininus summoned his army in Greece and that of his allies at Plataea in Boeotia. He then marched from Plataea to Argos where he was joined by 10,000 Achean infantry and 1,000 cavalry. After a few brief skirmishes, the allies decided to abandon the siege and they pitched in Tegea. They then advanced upon Caryae where they were joined by 1,500 Macedonians and 400 Thessalian cavalry.

Nabis also made his own preparations. Nabis had always been on good terms with Cretan leaders and he requested 1,000 of their best soldiers who were hand picked to assist him. As well as the Cretans, he hired 3,000 mercenaries and 10,000 citizens. The Romans and their allies then advanced upon Sellasia not far north of Sparta. The Romans were defeated in a small battle and they retreated. The Romans then won another battle against the Spartans and forced them to retreat into the city.

== Siege ==
Some coastal cities surrendered to the Romans which allowed them to have a base in the coastal regions of Laconia. Gythium was a large city and had been made by the Spartans as their main port and naval arsenal. The Romans advanced upon the city and they were joined there by the combined Rhodian and Pergamese fleets. The sailors from the Roman, Pergamese, and Rhodian fleets built siege engines which had devastating effects on the walls. One of the city's joint commanders, Dexagoridas, offered to surrender the city to the Roman legate in charge of the fleet while Flamininus was gone. When the other commander Gorgopas found out, he murdered Dexagoridas.

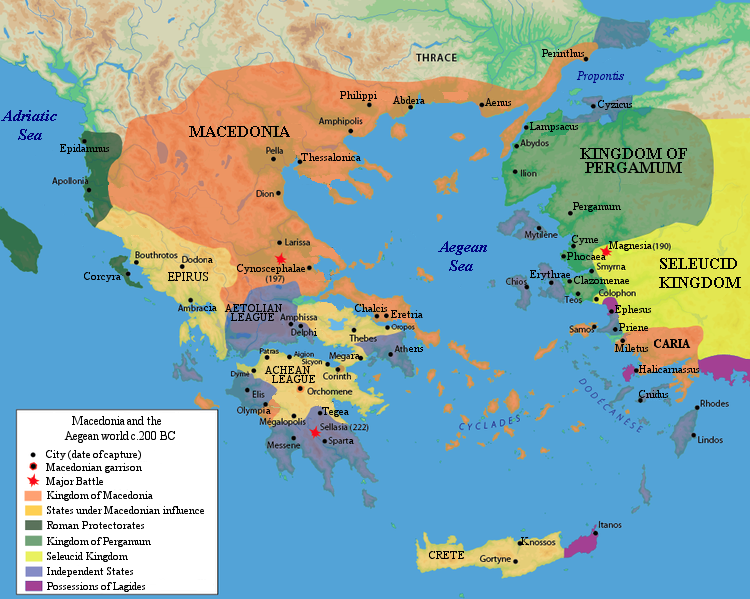
Macedonia and the Aegean world.

Now with the city under Gorgopas' command the defenders became reinvigorated. The siege was proving more difficult until Flamininus arrived with 4,000 Roman soldiers. With the arrival of the new soldiers, the allied soldiers were encouraged and began bombarding the city again with their siege engines while the Rhodian and Pergamese fleet continued to put pressure on the Spartans from the sea. The Spartans knew that they did not have much of a chance of withstanding the renewed allied assault and Gorgopas decided to surrender the city to the Romans under the condition that the garrison was allowed to leave the city unharmed.

== Aftermath ==
When Nabis found out that Gythium had fallen to the allies he decided to abandon the remaining Laconian countryside that he controlled. Nabis sent envoys to Flamininus who offered Nabis a parley. The Romans attacked Sparta when the parley ended but the Spartans withstood the initial allied assaults. Nabis, however, seeing that the situation was hopeless, agreed to surrender the city to the Romans. The Romans forced Nabis to abandon Argos and most of the coastal cities of Laconia. The Romans formed all the cities that had broken off from Sparta on the Laconian coast into the Union of Free Laconians. However, the Romans didn't strip Nabis of his powers because they wanted a state in the Peloponnese to counter the growing Achaean League. Nabis attacked Gythium two or three years later only to retreat after being unable to capture the city but in 192 BC he was assassinated by the Aetolians before he had a chance to attempt another attack on the city. In 189 BC, the Spartans, having been deprived of a port, attacked and captured the city of Las. The Acheans, threatened by the attack, demanded the surrender of those responsible for the attack and when that was refused they captured the city.
