= Iron maiden =

Mythical torture device

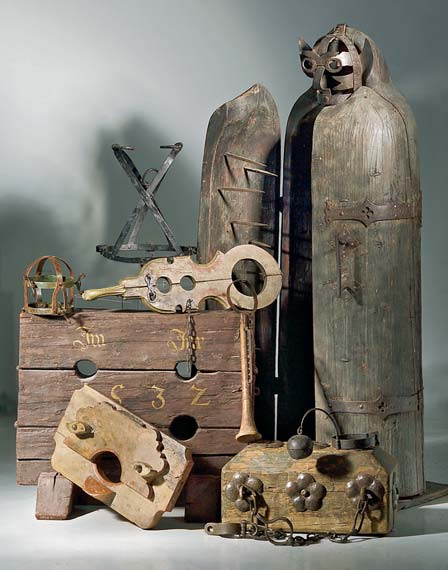
Various neo-medieval torture instruments. An iron maiden stands at the right, with its door opened to reveal the spikes on its interior surface.

The iron maiden is an apocryphal torture device, believed to have been first invented in the 19th century. It consists of a solid iron cabinet with a hinged front and spike-covered interior, sufficiently tall to enclose a human being. While often popularly thought to have been used in the medieval period, there is no known mention of the iron maiden from before the 19th century. It has become a popular image in media involving the Middle Ages and torture chambers.

== History ==
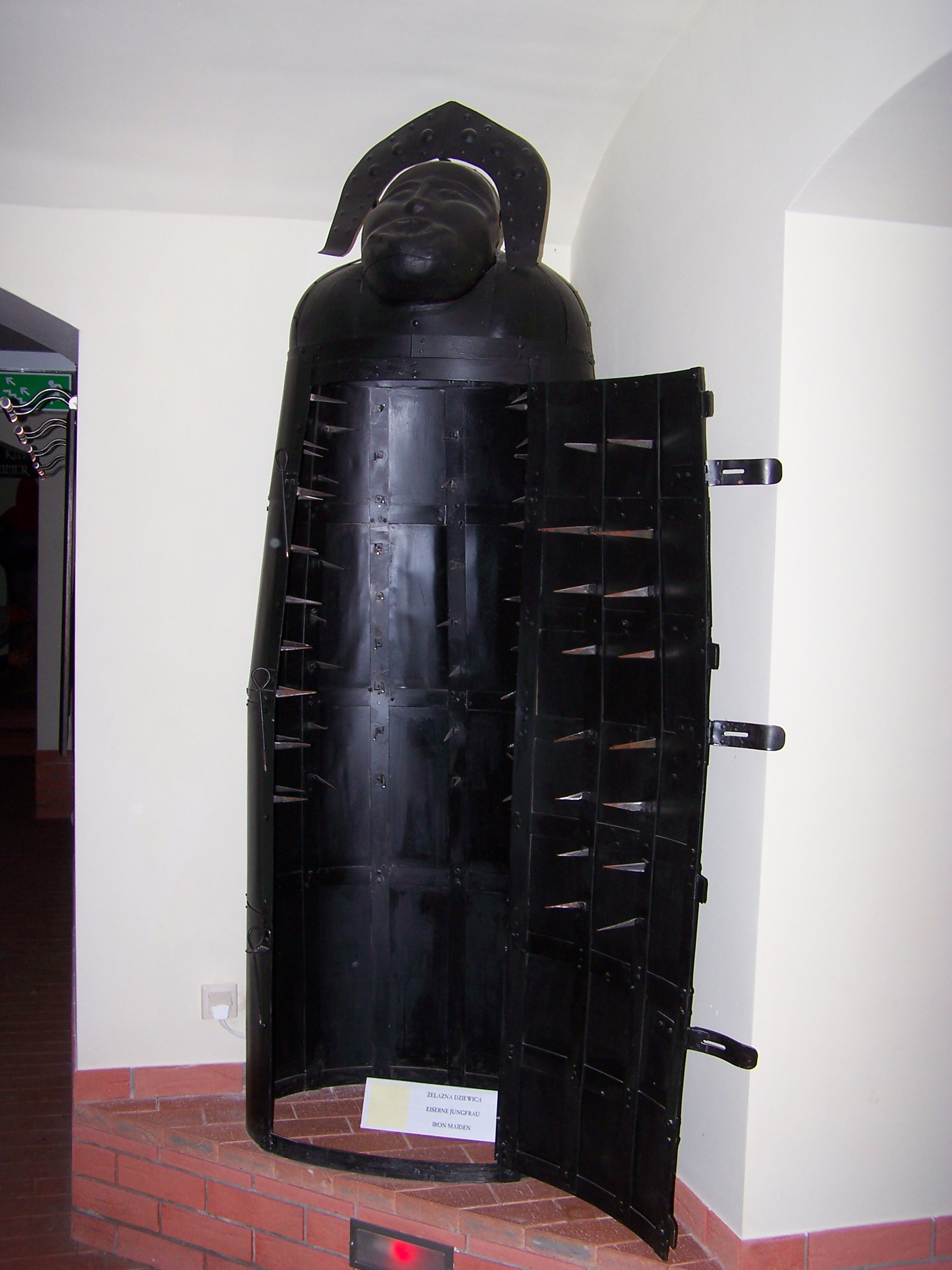
An open iron maiden

Despite its reputation as a medieval instrument of torture, there is no evidence of the existence of iron maidens before the 19th century. There are, however, ancient reports of the Spartan tyrant Nabis using a similar device around 200 BCE for extortion and murder. The Abbasid vizier Ibn al-Zayyat is said to have created a "wooden oven-like chest that had iron spikes" for torture, which would ironically be used during his own imprisonment and execution in 847.

Wolfgang Schild, a professor of criminal law, criminal law history, and philosophy of law at the Bielefeld University, has argued that putative iron maidens were pieced together from artifacts found in museums to create spectacular objects intended for (commercial) exhibition. Several 19th-century iron maidens are on display in museums around the world, including the Museum of Us, the Meiji University Museum, and several torture museums in Europe.

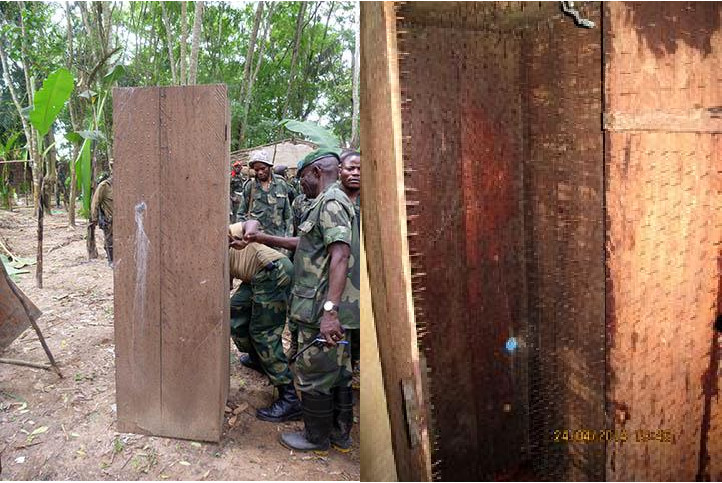
Alleged iron maiden from the outside (left) and inside (right) captured at jihadist camp in Congo

In April 2014, a purported "iron maiden" torture device was confiscated by Congolese soldiers at ADF camp at Madina.

=== Possible inspirations ===
The 19th-century iron maidens may have been constructed as a misinterpretation of a medieval Schandmantel, which was made of wood and metal but without spikes. Inspiration for the iron maiden may also have come from the Carthaginian execution of Marcus Atilius Regulus as recorded in Tertullian's "To the Martyrs" (Chapter 4) and Augustine of Hippo's The City of God (I.15), in which the Carthaginians "shut him into a tight wooden box, where he was forced to stand, spiked with the sharpest nails on all sides so that he could not lean in any direction without being pierced," or from Polybius' account of Nabis of Sparta's deadly statue of his wife, the Iron Apega (earliest form of the device).

== Iron maiden of Nuremberg ==
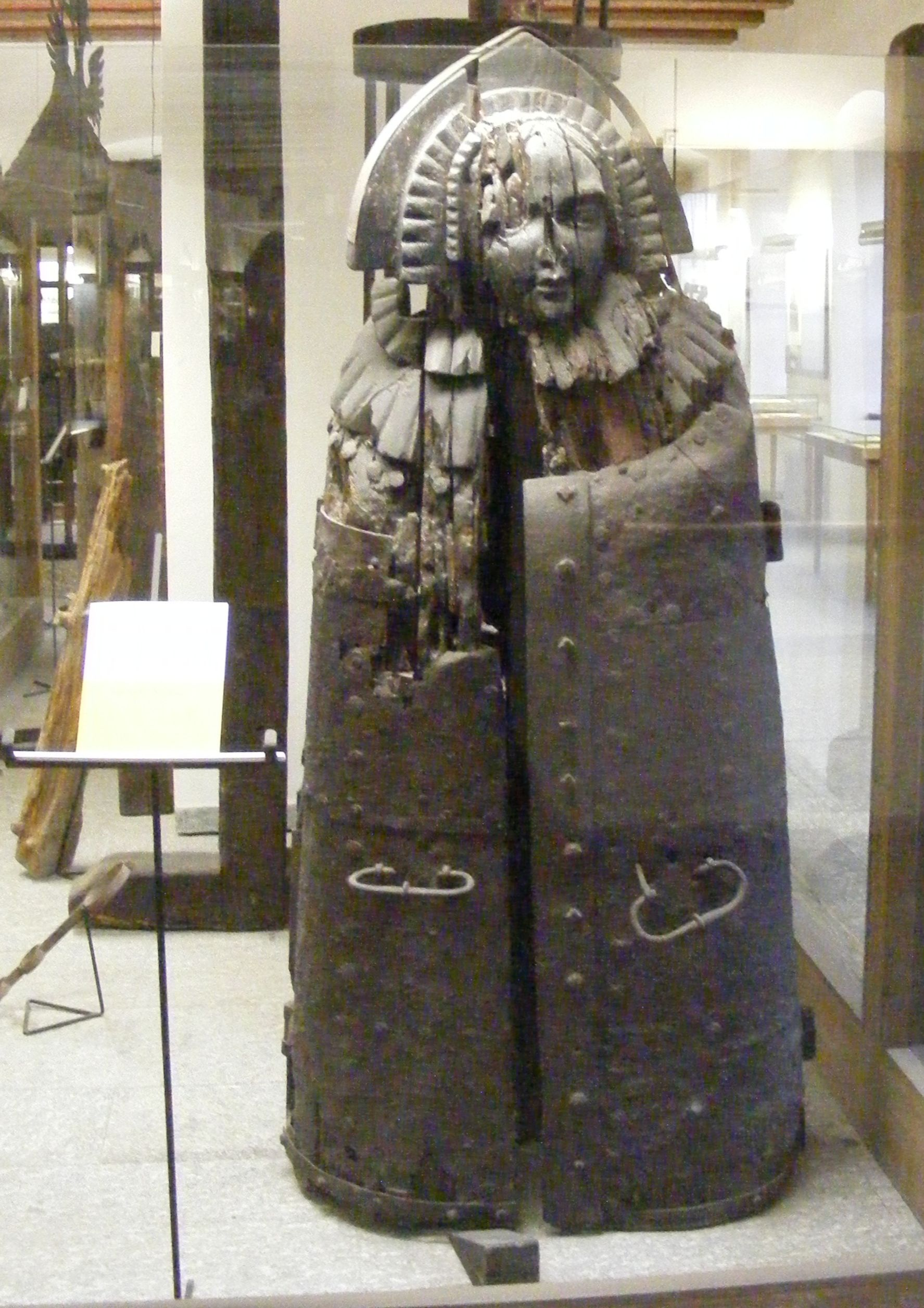
Copy of the iron maiden of Nuremberg on display in Rothenburg ob der Tauber

The most famous iron maiden that popularized the design was that of Nuremberg, first displayed possibly as far back as 1802. The original was lost in the Allied bombing of Nuremberg in 1945. A copy "from the Royal Castle of Nuremberg", crafted for public display, was sold through J. Ichenhauser of London to the Earl of Shrewsbury in 1890 along with other torture devices, and, after being displayed at the World's Columbian Exposition, Chicago, Illinois, 1893, was taken on an American tour. This copy was auctioned in the early 1960s and is now on display at the Medieval Crime Museum, Rothenburg ob der Tauber.

=== Origins ===
Some historians have argued that Johann Philipp Siebenkees (1759–1796) made up a history for the (imaginary) device. According to Siebenkees' colportage, it was first used on August 14, 1515, to execute a coin forger.

== See also ==
- Pear of anguish – another supposed medieval torture device with little actual evidence of use
- Brazen bull
- Ducking stool
- Uday Hussein – built a similar device during the 1990s
