= Agesipolis =

Agesipolis may refer to:

- Agesipolis I, king of the Agiad dynasty in Sparta, from 394 BC to 380 BC
- Agesipolis II, king of the Agiad dynasty in Sparta, from 371 to 369 BC
- Agesipolis III (died 183 BC), the last Agiad king of Sparta, 219 to 215 BC
