= Huaiyang =

Huaiyang may refer to:

- Huaiyang County, in Henan, China
- Huaiyang cuisine, centered upon Yangzhou and Huai'an in Jiangsu, China
- Kingdom of Huaiyang, a vassal kingdom of the Han dynasty
