= King Zhao =

King Zhao may refer to:

- King Zhao of Zhou (1027–957 BC), king of the Zhou dynasty
- King Zhao of Chu (died 489 BC), king of Chu during the Spring and Autumn period
- King Zhaoxiang of Qin (325–251 BC), also known as King Zhao of Qin

== See also ==
- Duke Zhao (disambiguation)
- Prince of Zhao (disambiguation)
