= Zhao Kingdom (Han dynasty) =

Chinese kingdom or principality (203 BC–213 AD)

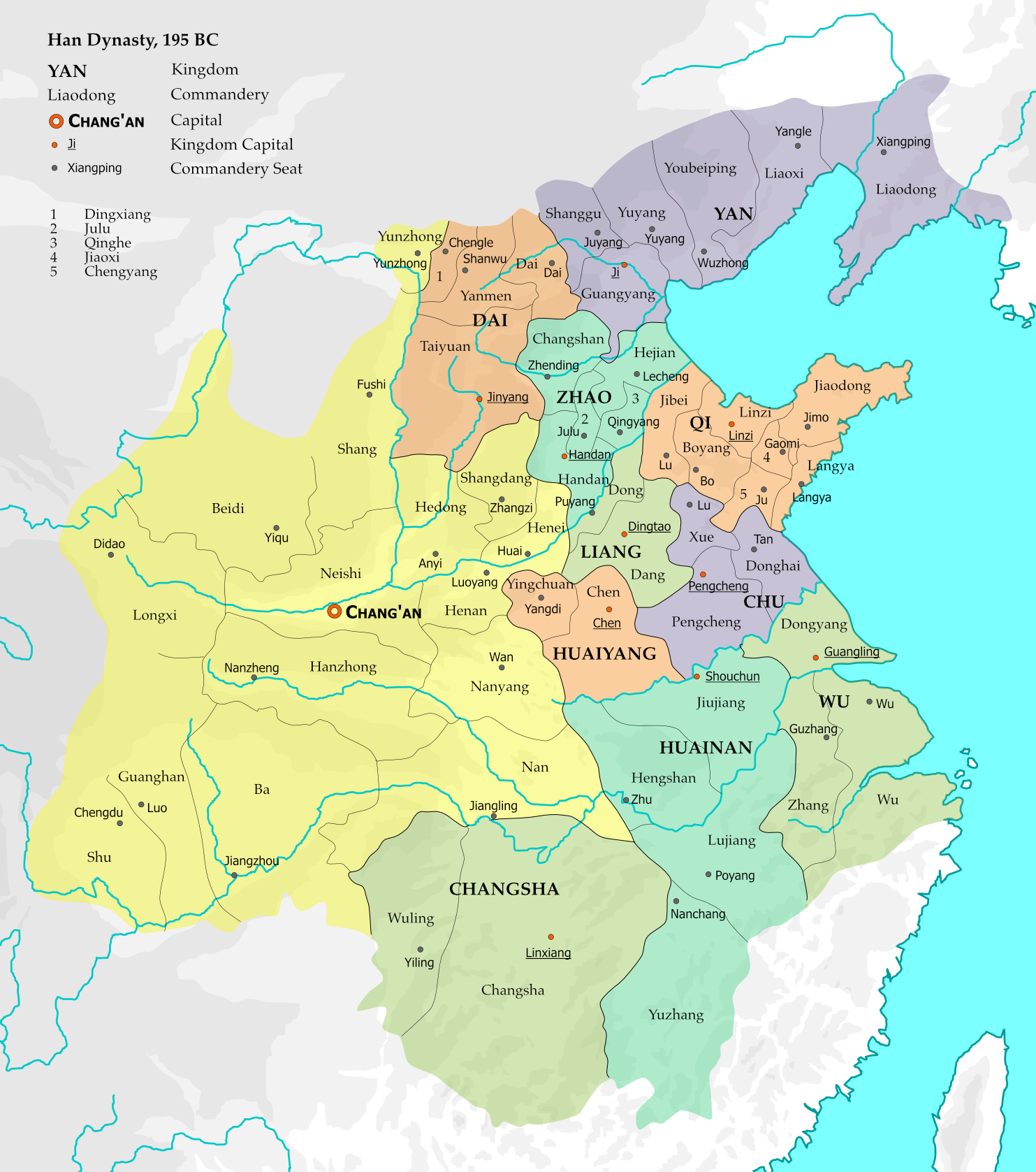
Kingdoms of the Han dynasty in 195 BC

Zhao Kingdom or Zhao Principality (Chinese: 趙國) was a kingdom or principality in early Imperial China, located in present-day North China.

The kingdom was created in 203 BC and granted to Zhang Er, a follower of Emperor Gaozu of Han. The kingdom covered five Qin-era commanderies, including Handan (邯鄲), Julu (鉅鹿), Qinghe (清河), Hejian (河間) and Changshan (常山). In 199 BC, however, because of a failed assassination attempt on the emperor by several of his ministers, Zhang Ao, son of Zhang Er, was demoted to marquess and this kingdom became extinct.

Liu Ruyi, a young son of Liu Bang (Emperor Gao of Han) and a favoured concubine, Consort Qi, was made Prince Yin of Zhao by Emperor Gao in around 198 BC. Shortly after the death of the emperor in 195 BC, Prince Yin of Zhao died as a result of poisoning in a plot instigated by the emperor's widow, Empress Lü, to ensure he would not become emperor.

Ruyi was succeeded by Liu You, son of Emperor Gaozu and Empress Lü. In 181 BC, his consort, a relative of Empress Lü, falsely accused You to be plotting a rebellion. Liu You was called back to the capital and killed. He was succeeded by Liu Hui (劉恢), who committed suicide the same year after his favorite concubine was poisoned by the Empress Lü. After Hui's death, Lü dissolved the kingdom.

In 179 BC, Zhao was granted to Liu Sui, son of Liu You. A year later, Hejian was created as a separate kingdom. Sui rebelled during the Rebellion of the Seven States and was defeated. Liu Pengzu (劉彭祖), a son of Emperor Jing was named the new Prince of Zhao. Thereafter, Zhao was reduced to a fraction of its former size and only covered Handan Commandery.

Over the rest of Western Han, more than 20 marquessates were created on the territories of Zhao. They were administered by neighboring commanderies, further reducing Zhao's territory. In 2 AD, Zhao administered only 4 counties, namely Handan, Yiyang (易陽), Bairen (柏人) and Xiangguo (襄國), with a population of 349,952, in 84,202 households. The kingdom was abolished during Wang Mang's usurpation.

After the restoration of the Han dynasty under Emperor Guangwu, the kingdom was granted to Liu Liang (劉良), the uncle of the emperor. His descendants held the kingdom until 213 AD when the kingdom was abolished and converted to Zhao Commandery (趙郡).

The territory became the fief of Cao Gan after the establishment of the Cao Wei Dynasty, while during the early Western Jin dynasty, it was Sima Lun's fief.

== Kings of Zhao ==
- Zhang Er, King Jing of Zhao (趙景王), 203–202 BC
- Zhang Ao, 202–199 BC
- Liu Ruyi, King Yin of Zhao (趙隱王), 197–194 BC
- Liu You, King You of Zhao (趙幽王), 194–181 BC
- Liu Hui (劉恢), King Gong of Zhao (趙共王), 181 BC
- Liu Sui, 179–154 BC
- Liu Pengzu (劉彭祖), King Su of Zhao (趙肅王), 153–92 BC
- Liu Chang (劉昌), King Qing of Zhao (趙頃王), 92–73 BC
- Liu Zun (劉尊), King Huai of Zhao (趙懷王), 73–68 BC
- Liu Gao (劉高), King Ai of Zhao (趙哀王), 66 BC
- Liu Chong (劉充), King Gong of Zhao (趙共王), 65–10 BC
- Liu Yin (劉隱), 10–9 BC
- Liu Liang (劉良), King Xiao of Zhao (趙孝王), 29–37 AD
- Liu Xu (劉栩), King Jie of Zhao (趙節王), ?–81
- Liu Shang (劉商), King Qing of Zhao (趙頃王), 81–104
- Liu Hong (劉宏), King Jing of Zhao (趙靖王), 104–116
- Liu Qian (劉乾), King Hui of Zhao (趙惠王), 116–164
- Liu Yu (劉豫), King Huai of Zhao (趙懷王), 164–?
- Liu She (劉赦), King Xian of Zhao (趙獻王), ?–?
- Liu Gui (劉珪), ?–213

== See also ==
- Zhao (state)
