= Shusun Tong =

Chinese politician and writer

Shusun Tong (Chinese: 叔孫通; died ca 188 BCE) was a Chinese politician and writer who served the Qin and Western Han courts. He is known for organization of the first court worship for the Emperor Gaozu of Han (202 BCE), as well as for the custody over the young crown prince Ying, the future Emperor Hui. His biography is presented in Chapter 99 of Shiji and Chapter 19 of the Book of Han. According to Martin Kern, he is the best-documented among the Qin "erudites" (boshi 博士, ritual and canonical specialists). After leaving the Qin court, he joined the services of Xiang Liang, Emperor Yi of Chu and Xiang Yu, before surrendering to Liu Bang when the Han armies took Pengcheng in 205 BC. In 195 BC, before his death, Liu Bang thought of changing his crown prince from Liu Ying to Liu Ruyi, son of Consort Qi; Shusun was one of the officials who advised against the change.

Characterizing his contribution, Shi ji (vol. 23, "Book on Rituals") states: "Shusun Tong roughly made some additions and subtractions, [but] for the most part in everything he imitated the old [practices] of Qin." Thus, Shusun Tong was the linchpin in the continuity of the court ritual from Qin to Han, while the former tradition in its own right stemmed from the Zhou ritual.

Shusun Tong was a native of Xue (zh:薛国), only about 30 km from the birthplace of Liu Bang, which made him well acquainted with the Chu musical tradition and thus allowed to accommodate the Qin ritual to the Han imperial taste.

== Legacy & Evaluation ==
His biography serves as an argument against the traditional stereotype about the suppression of classical knowledge under the Qin: he did not just survive, but brought to the Han court his followers, more than 100 disciples (從儒生弟子百餘人). While Sima Qian praised Shusun for adapting according to circumstances and being able to keep the big picture in mind, Sima Guang criticized Shusun's organization of Han court rituals as self-promotion, resulting in the loss of ancient rites.

== See also ==
- Yi Yin ( a sage who helped Tang after being dismissed)
