= Huai Wang =

Huai Wang (King/Prince Huai or King/Prince of Huai) may refer to:

- King Huai of Chu (died 296 BC), ruler of Chu during the Warring States period
- Emperor Yi of Chu (died 206 BC), also known as King Huai of Chu, ruler of Chu during the Qin–Han transition
- Liu Zun (died 68 BC), ruler of Zhao during the Han dynasty, posthumously known as King Huai of Zhao
- Liu Bian (176–190), Han dynasty emperor, posthumously known as Prince Huai of Hongnong
- Cao Xuan (Cao Cao's son) (fl. 210s), Cao Wei prince, posthumously known as Prince Huai of Jiyang
- Jayaatu Khan Tugh Temür (1304–1332), Yuan dynasty emperor, known as Prince of Huai (懷王) before he became emperor
- Zhu Changqing (died 1649), Southern Ming emperor, known as Prince of Huai (淮王) before he became emperor
