= Duke Zhao =

Duke Zhao may refer to these ancient Chinese rulers:

- Duke Zhao of Qi (died 613 BC)
- Duke Zhao of Jin (died 526 BC)

== See also ==
- King Zhao (disambiguation)
- Duke of Shao (died c. 1000 BC), sometimes translated as Duke Shao or Duke Zhao
