= Alexamenus of Aetolia =

2nd-century BC Ancient Greek general

- Rank: General
- Conflicts: War against Nabis

Alexamenus (Ancient Greek: Ἀλεξαμενός), a general of the Aetolians in 196 BC, who was sent by the Aetolians in 192 during the War against Nabis, to obtain possession of Sparta. He succeeded in his object, and killed Nabis, the tyrant of Sparta, but the Lacedaemonians rising against him shortly after, he and most of his troops were killed.
