= 245 BC =

245 BC in various calendars
- Gregorian calendar: 245 BC; CCXLV BC
- Ab urbe condita: 509
- Ancient Egypt era: XXXIII dynasty, 79
- Pharaoh: Ptolemy III Euergetes, 2
- Ancient Greek Olympiad (summer): 133rd Olympiad, year 4
- Assyrian calendar: 4506
- Balinese saka calendar: N/A
- Bengali calendar: −838 – −837
- Berber calendar: 706
- Buddhist calendar: 300
- Burmese calendar: −882
- Byzantine calendar: 5264–5265
- Chinese calendar: 乙卯年 (Wood Rabbit); 2453 or 2246 — to — 丙辰年 (Fire Dragon); 2454 or 2247
- Coptic calendar: −528 – −527
- Discordian calendar: 922
- Ethiopian calendar: −252 – −251
- Hebrew calendar: 3516–3517
- Hindu calendars
- Vikram Samvat: −188 – −187
- Shaka Samvat: N/A
- Kali Yuga: 2856–2857
- Holocene calendar: 9756
- Iranian calendar: 866 BP – 865 BP
- Islamic calendar: 893 BH – 892 BH
- Javanese calendar: N/A
- Julian calendar: N/A
- Korean calendar: 2089
- Minguo calendar: 2156 before ROC 民前2156年
- Nanakshahi calendar: −1712
- Seleucid era: 67/68 AG
- Thai solar calendar: 298–299
- Tibetan calendar: ཤིང་མོ་ཡོས་ལོ་ (female Wood-Hare) −118 or −499 or −1271 — to — མེ་ཕོ་འབྲུག་ལོ་ (male Fire-Dragon) −117 or −498 or −1270

The year 245 BC was a year of the pre-Julian Roman calendar. At the time it was known as the Year of the Consulship of Buteo and Bulbus (or, less frequently, year 509 Ab urbe condita). The denomination 245 BC for this year has been used since the early medieval period, when the Anno Domini calendar era became the prevalent method in Europe for naming years.

== Events ==
=== By place ===
==== Egypt ====
- Babylon and Susa fall to the Ptolemaic armies of Ptolemy III.
- Following a long engagement, Ptolemy III marries Berenice II, the daughter of Magas, king of Cyrene; thereby reuniting Egypt and Cyrenaica.

==== Greece ====
- After the death of his nephew, Alexander of Corinth, Antigonus II gives Nicaea, Alexander's widow, to his son Demetrius in marriage. Through this action, Antigonus II regains Corinth which has been independent while under the rule of Alexander of Corinth.
- Aratus of Sicyon is elected general (strategos) of the Achaean League.

==== China ====
- The Qin general Pao Gong captures the Wei city of Juan.
- The Zhao general Lian Po captures the Wei city of Fanyang.

=== By subject ===
==== Culture ====
- Approximate date – Callimachus produces the Pinakes, a subject index to the Library of Alexandria.

== Births ==
- Hasdrubal Barca, Carthaginian general and Younger brother of Hannibal (d. 207 BC)

== Deaths ==
- Apollonius of Rhodes, Greek poet, grammarian, and author of the Argonautica, an epic in four books on the voyage of the Argonauts (b. c. 295 BC)
