= Gorgopas (2nd century BC) =

Spartan garrison commander at Gythium

Gorgopas was one of the joint Spartan garrison commanders at Gythium. During the Roman-Spartan War, the Romans and their allies started besieging Gythium. After a few days of fighting, Gorgopas' joint commander, Dexagoridas, told a Roman legate that he was willing to surrender the city. When Gorgopas found out, he slew Dexagoridas with his own hands. Gorgopas continued to command the city but when the Roman commander-in-chief Titus Quinctius Flaminius arrived with reinforcements, Gorgopas surrendered on the condition that he and the garrison could return to Sparta unharmed. Nothing more is heard of him.
