= Prince of Zhao =

Prince of Zhao or King of Zhao (Chinese: 趙王) may refer to:

== Zhou dynasty ==
- King Wuling of Zhao (325–299 BC), first ruler of Zhao state declared King
- King Huiwen of Zhao (299–266 BC), inherited throne after abdication of King Wuling of Zhao

== Han dynasty ==
- Zhao Xie (205–203 BC), descendant of Zhao state who was captured and executed in Battle of Jingxing
- Zhang Er (張耳; 203–202 BC), created as Prince of Zhao for assisting Han Xin in Battle of Jingxing
- Zhang Ao (202–198 BC), son-in-law of Emperor Gaozu of Han who was falsely accused of conspiring rebellion
- Liu Ruyi (198–194 BC), fourth son of Emperor Gaozu of Han, killed by Empress Dowager Lü
- Liu You (194–181 BC), sixth son of Emperor Gaozu of Han, starved to death in prison
- Liu Hui (181 BC), fifth son of Emperor Gaozu of Han, committed suicide
- Lü Lu (181–180 BC), nephew of Empress Dowager Lü created as prince during the Lü Clan Disturbance
- Liu Sui (180–154 BC), son of Liu You and one of the seven princes in the Rebellion of the Seven States

== Tang dynasty ==
- Li Fu (639–660), thirteenth son of Emperor Taizong of Tang

== Five Dynasties and Ten Kingdoms ==
- Wang Rong (910–921), prince of the Later Liang and king of a briefly independent Zhao
- Zhang Wenli (921), adopted son of Wang Rong
- Zhang Chujin (921–922), son of Zhang Wenli

== Ming dynasty ==
- Zhu Qi (1370–1371), ninth son of Hongwu Emperor
- Zhu Gaosui, third son of Yongle Emperor, the 1st Prince of Zhao

== See also ==
- Wang (title), the ambiguous title held by these people
