= Pelops of Sparta =

King of Sparta

- Born: c. 210s BC; Sparta
- Father: Lykourgos

Pelops (Ancient Greek: Πέλοψ) was King of Sparta of the Eurypontid dynasty. He was the son of Lykourgos.

He was born sometime around 210 BC, and his father soon died that year. Since he was an infant, a regent reigned, first Machanidas and then Nabis. Pelops was assassinated by Nabis, who assumed the throne in 199 BC. He was the last of the Eurypontid Dynasty.

| Preceded by Lykourgos | Eurypontid King of Sparta; 210–199 BC | Succeeded by Nabis (usurper) |
