= Liu Ruyi =

Han dynasty prince (208–194 BC)

King of Zhao (趙王)
- Reign: c. February 198 BC - c. January 194 BC
- Predecessor: Zhang Ao
- Successor: Liu You
- Born: 208 BC
- Died: c. January 194 BC
- Dynasty: Han dynasty
- Father: Emperor Gaozu of Han
- Mother: Consort Qi

Liu Ruyi
- Traditional Chinese: 劉如意
- Simplified Chinese: 刘如意
Transcriptions
Standard Mandarin
- Hanyu Pinyin: Liǘ Rúyì
- Wade–Giles: Liu Ju-i

Other names

Zhao Yinwang
- Traditional Chinese: 趙隱王
- Simplified Chinese: 赵隐王
- Literal meaning: The Suffering King of Zhao
Transcriptions
Standard Mandarin
- Hanyu Pinyin: Zhào Yǐnwáng
- Wade–Giles: Chao Yin-wang

Liu Ruyi (208 – c. January 194 BC), posthumously known as the "Suffering King of Zhao" (趙隱王, Zhào Yǐnwáng), was the only son of the first Han emperor Liu Bang's concubine Consort Qi. He was a favorite of the emperor and appointed king or prince of Dai and Zhao, but loathed by his stepmother, the Empress Lü Zhi, as consort Qi had attempted to persuade Liu Bang to have Liu Ruyi replace Liu Ying (Lü's son) as crown prince. Despite his half-brother Emperor Hui's protection, she finally succeeded in killing him in 194 BC.

== Life ==
Liu Ruyi was the third son of Liu Bang, the founder of China's Han dynasty who became posthumously known as Emperor Gaozu ("High Ancestor"). He was the only son of the concubine Consort Qi.

As a boy, after his uncle Liu Zhong abandoned his post during a Xiongnu invasion, Liu Ruyi was created prince or king of Dai in 200 BC.

After Zhang Ao was falsely accused of conspiring against the throne, Ruyi replaced him as prince or king of Zhao c. February 198 BC. The next year, he received Chen Xi as his chancellor of the realm but Chen soon launched a rebellion at Julu (within present-day Pingxiang County, Hebei); he was defeated in battle but remained at large for several years. When Liu Bang fell ill in early 195 BC, he found that Empress Lü Zhi was plotting to kill Ruyi in order to eliminate a rival claimant to the imperial throne; Liu Bang at one point had considered making Liu Ruyi crown prince, but eventually did not do so after advice from various officials, including Shusun Tong, Liu Ying's teacher. The emperor then appointed Zhou Chang as chancellor in Zhao to protect the prince from his stepmother.

The emperor died later that year, and the new emperor Liu Ying—posthumously known as "Huidi" or "Benevolent Emperor"—continued to protect his half-brother from his mother's numerous attempts on the boy's life. Lü Zhi was finally able to accomplish her task in c.January 194 BC; she also had Consort Qi brutally tortured to death in the same year.

Prince Yin of Zhao House of Liu Born: 208 BC Died: 195 BC
Chinese royalty
| Preceded by Liu Xi | Prince of Dai; 200 BC – 198 BC | Succeeded by Liu Heng later became Emperor Wen of Han |
| Preceded by Zhang Ao | Prince of Zhao; 198 BC – 194 BC | Succeeded by Liu You |
