= Huaiyang Kingdom =

Ancient Chinese kingdom

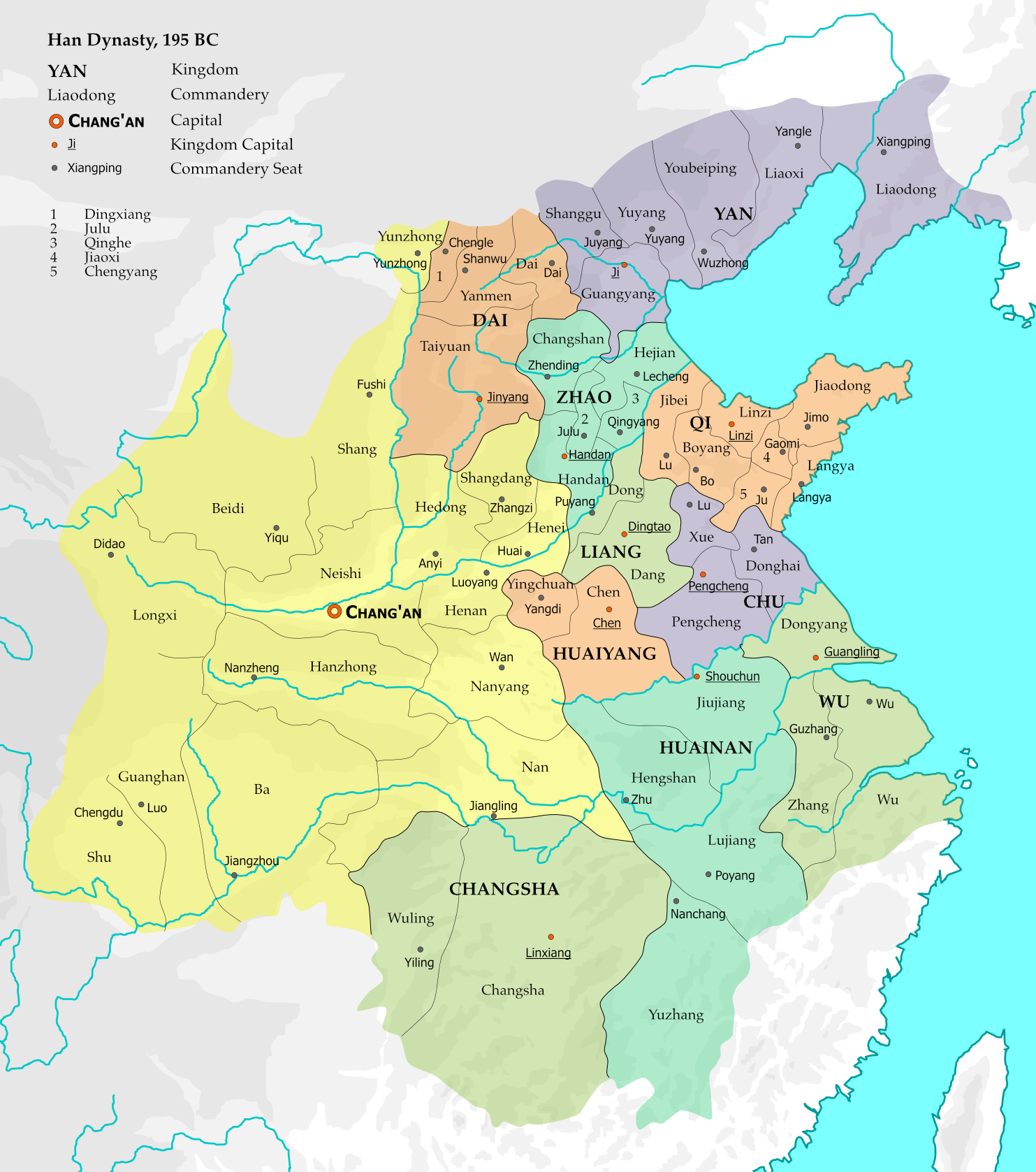
Kingdoms of the Han dynasty in 195 BC

Huaiyang (淮陽國), was a kingdom/principality that existed intermittently during the Han dynasty. Its territories was located in modern eastern Henan and northwestern Anhui.

Huaiyang initially covered the later Chen, Yingchuan and Runan commanderies and a total of more than 60 counties. In 196 BC Liu You (劉友), a son of the Emperor Gaozu and the first Prince of Huaiyang, was granted the territory, but was moved to Zhao two years later. Liu Qiang (劉彊), a son of the Emperor Hui, took over Huaiyang. After Qiang's death, the fief passed to his brother Wu (武), who was killed in the Lü Clan Disturbance in 180 BC. At this time, Huaiyang was already reduced to the equivalent of one commandery.

Both the Emperor Wen and Emperor Jing appointed one of their sons to Huaiyang, however, in both cases, the prince was eventually relocated to another principality, and Huaiyang became administered by the central government as the Huaiyang Commandery. In 63 BC, Emperor Xuan granted the title Prince of Huaiyang to his son Liu Qin (劉欽), whose descendants held the title until the Xin dynasty was founded.

During Emperor Guangwu's reign, the title "Prince of Huaiyang" was briefly bestowed to Liu Xuan, commonly known as the Gengshi Emperor, a former pretender to the Han throne during the post-Xin dynasty interregnum. However, Xuan had been killed by the Chimei before he had a chance to move to his fief. The kingdom/principality was reinstated for a final time in 79 AD, when Liu Bing (劉昞), a son of the Emperor Ming, was granted the fief. Bing died without designating an heir, and the kingdom was dissolved.

In 2 AD, Huaiyang consisted of 9 counties: Chen (陳), Ku (苦), Yangjia (陽夏), Ningping (寧平), Fugou (扶溝), Gushi (固始), Yu (圉), Xinping (新平) and Zhe (柘). The population was 981,423, in 135,544 households.

== List of rulers ==
- Liu You (友), Prince You of Zhao (趙幽王), 196–194 BC;
- Liu Qiang (彊), 187–183 BC;
- Liu Wu (武), 183–180 BC;
- Liu Wu (武), Prince Xiao of Liang (梁孝王), 176–168 BC;
- Liu Yu (餘), Prince Gong of Lu (魯共王), 155–153 BC;
- Liu Qin (欽), Prince Xian (憲) of Huaiyang, 63–27 BC;
- Liu Xuan (玄), Prince Wen (文) of Huaiyang, 27–1 BC;
- Liu Yan (縯), 1 BC – 9 AD.
- Liu Bing (昞), 79–88 AD.
