= Apia of Sparta =

Queen of Sparta (fl. 3rd–2nd century BC)

Apia of Sparta, also found as Apega in older literature, (Ancient Greek: Ἀπῆγα) (fl. 3rd–2nd century BC) was a Queen of Sparta.

She was a daughter of the tyrant Aristippus of Argos. When her father died in battle around 228 BC, her uncle Aristomachos, became the new ruler of Argos before being overthrown and executed only a year later.

It is unclear if she was still in Argos by this point or if she was already married to Nabis, who would later become the tyrant of Sparta. Ancient sources describe her as being as tyrannical as her husband, and even acting as his effective co-tyrant.

Together, they had two sons and one daughter. One daughter was married to Apia's brother, Pythagoras. There was also a failed attempt to marry their sons to daughters of Philip V of Macedon.

The only known name of Apia and Nabis' children is their son Amenas, who was taken hostage after the defeat of his father by the Roman general Titus Quinctius Flamininus. He was then sent to Rome, where he died some time later.

The Greek historian, Polybius (203–120 BC, author of The Histories), described Apia as ruling Sparta like a Hellenistic queen, similar to Cleopatra and Arsinoe, because she "received men at court alongside her husband." Polybius also mentioned that she knew the art of dishonouring men by humiliating women belonging to the families of male citizens. Both Nabis and Apia brought suffering and violence to their subjects by stealing their wealth and valuables. Livy writes of how she acted as Nabis' right-hand in plundering towns; when describing Nabis' actions in Argos, he writes, "He had despoiled the men and now he sent his wife there to despoil the women."

One of Nabis' well-known torture devices, the Apega of Nabis, was modelled after her.

Nabis was killed in 192 by Aetolians, and Apia's death date is unknown.

== Sources ==
- Livy's Ab Urbe Condita Libri
- Polybius' Histories
