= Apega of Nabis =

Ancient torture device

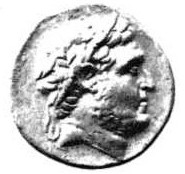
An ancient Greek coin with a portrait of Nabis, king of Sparta and inventor of the Iron Apega.

The Apega of Nabis, also known as the Iron Apega, was described by Polybius as an ancient torture device similar to the iron maiden. It was invented by Nabis, a king who ruled Sparta as a tyrant from 207 to 192 BC.

== Device description ==
The mechanical Apega, according to Polybius, was a machine, a well-executed replica of the real wife of Nabis, and was used by Nabis to collect money from unwilling Spartan citizens. Those who did not give money were sent to deal with his wife. This was the replica, dressed in expensive clothing, with arms outstretched. When the drunken visitors hugged her, this triggered the arms to close. The device's arms, hands, and breasts were covered with iron nails, and the arms were capable of crushing the body of its victim. Nabis would control the machine through hidden devices until the victim agreed to pay a tribute or to the point of death.

The automaton, Apega, was one of the advances in technology of the ancient Greco-Roman world used as implements of torture, along with other torture devices such as the cross, the wheel, and the brazen bull of Phalaris.

== Origins ==
Nabis, tyrant of Sparta, reportedly created the device in the image of his own wife, Apega (Ancient Greek: Ἀπήγα; also known as Ἀγαπήνα or Ἀπία), a tyrant herself who helped in furthering her husband's ambitions. The Greek historian Polybius (203–120 BC, author of The Histories) further described the real Queen Apega as a female ruler who ruled Sparta like a Hellenistic queen, similar to Cleopatra and Arsinoe, because she "received men at court alongside her husband." Polybius also mentioned that she was a woman who knew how to dishonor men by humiliating women belonging to the families of male citizens. Both Nabis and Apega brought suffering and violence to their subjects by stealing their wealth and valuables.

The historical Apega was described as a Spartan woman who had exceeded her husband's viciousness and wielded power to satisfy her own greed. The Iron Apega was further described as the personification of the evil and deceitfulness of the real Apega and was said to be equal to Pandora, the first woman in Greek mythology.

== Literary references ==
In Arthur Machen's episodic horror novella The Three Impostors (1895), one story centers on an execution device named the "Iron Maid", which in its outstretched arms bears a great resemblance to the Iron Apega. Nabis and Apega are mentioned in Adrienne Mayor’s “Gods and Robots”.
