= Agesipolis III =

2nd-century BC Spartan king

Agesipolis III Ἀγησίπολις
- King of Sparta
- Reign: 219–215 BC
- Predecessor: Cleomenes III
- Successor: None
- Died: 183 BC
- Dynasty: Agiad
- Father: Agesipolis

Agesipolis III (Ancient Greek: Ἀγησίπολις; died 183 BC) was the 32nd and last of the kings of the Agiad dynasty in ancient Sparta.

Agesipolis was the son of another Agesipolis and grandson of Cleombrotus II and Chilonis, daughter of Leonidas II and Cratesiclea. After the death of Cleomenes III he was elected king while still a minor, and placed under the dubious guardianship of an uncle named Cleomenes. Agesipolis was, however, soon deposed by his colleague Lycurgus. In 195 BC, he was at the head of the Lacedaemonian exiles, who joined Titus Quinctius Flamininus in his attack upon Nabis, the tyrant of Lacedaemon (see War against Nabis). Agesipolis was a member of an embassy sent about 183 to Rome by the Lacedaemonian exiles, and, with his companions, was intercepted by pirates and killed.

Regnal titles
Preceded by Cleomenes III	Agiad King of Sparta; 219–215 BC	Vacant
