= Dexagoridas =

Dexagoridas (died 195 BC) was the joint Spartan commander of the port of Gythium. During the Roman-Spartan War, the Romans and their allies besieged Gythium. After a few days of fighting, Dexagoridas sent word to a Roman legate saying he was willing to surrender the city. But when the other commander of the garrison, Gorgopas, found out, he slew Dexagoridas with his own hands. The garrison managed to hold out for a few days but when the Roman commander-in-chief, Titus Quinctius Flamininus, arrived with reinforcements, Gorgopas surrendered on the condition that he could return to Sparta, with the garrison unharmed.
