= Liu Zun =

Liu Zun (Chinese: 劉尊, died 68 BC), posthumously King Huai of Zhao (趙懷王), was the ruler of Zhao Kingdom from 73 BC to 68 BC during the Western Han dynasty.

His great-grandfather was Liu Qi (Emperor Jing of Han). He succeeded his father Liu Chang (劉昌). After five years on the throne, he died without a son. The kingdom was without a ruler for the next two years until Emperor Xuan of Han installed Liu Zun's younger brother Liu Gao (劉高) in 66 BC.
