= Machanidas =

Tyrant of ancient Lacedaemon

Machanidas (Ancient Greek: Μαχανίδας) was a tyrant of Lacedaemon near the end of the 3rd century BC. He was defeated and slain by Philopoemen.

== Accession ==
Machanidas was in a band of Tarentine mercenaries, perhaps a leader, in the pay of the Spartan government. The history of Lacedaemon at this period is obscure. The means by which he obtained the tyranny are unknown. He was probably at first associated with Pelops, son and successor of Lycurgus on the double throne of Sparta. He either eclipsed or expelled Lycurgus. Livy refers to Machanidas as "the tyrant of the Lacedaemonians". Like his predecessor, Machanidas had no hereditary or other justification for taking the crown. However, unlike Lycurgus he respected neither the ephors nor the laws, and ruled by the swords of his followers. Argos and the Achaean League found him a restless and relentless neighbor, whom they could not resist without the aid of Macedonia. Rome in the 11th year of the Second Punic War, was anxious to detain Philip V and employed him as an ally.

== Aetolian War ==
Towards the close of the Aetolian War, in 207 BC, while the Greek states were negotiating the terms of peace, and the Eleans were making preparations for the next Olympic festival, Machanidas projected an inroad into the sacred territory of Elis. The design was frustrated by the timely arrival of the king of Macedon in the Peloponnesus, and Machanidas withdrew to Sparta.

== Fall ==
In 207 BC, after eight months of preparation, Philopoemen, captain-general of the cavalry of the Achaean league, delivered Greece from Machanidas. The Achaean and Lacedaemonian armies met between Mantineia and Tegea. In the Battle of Mantinea the Tarentine mercenaries of Machanidas routed and chased from the field the Tarentine mercenaries of Philopoemen. The Tarentines pursued them into defeat. The Achaeans became entrenched behind a deep ditch. Machanidas was killed by Philopoemen while jumping his horse over the ditch. The Achaeans set up a statue of brass at Delphi, representing Philopoemen giving the death-wound to Machanidas.
