= Liu Sui =

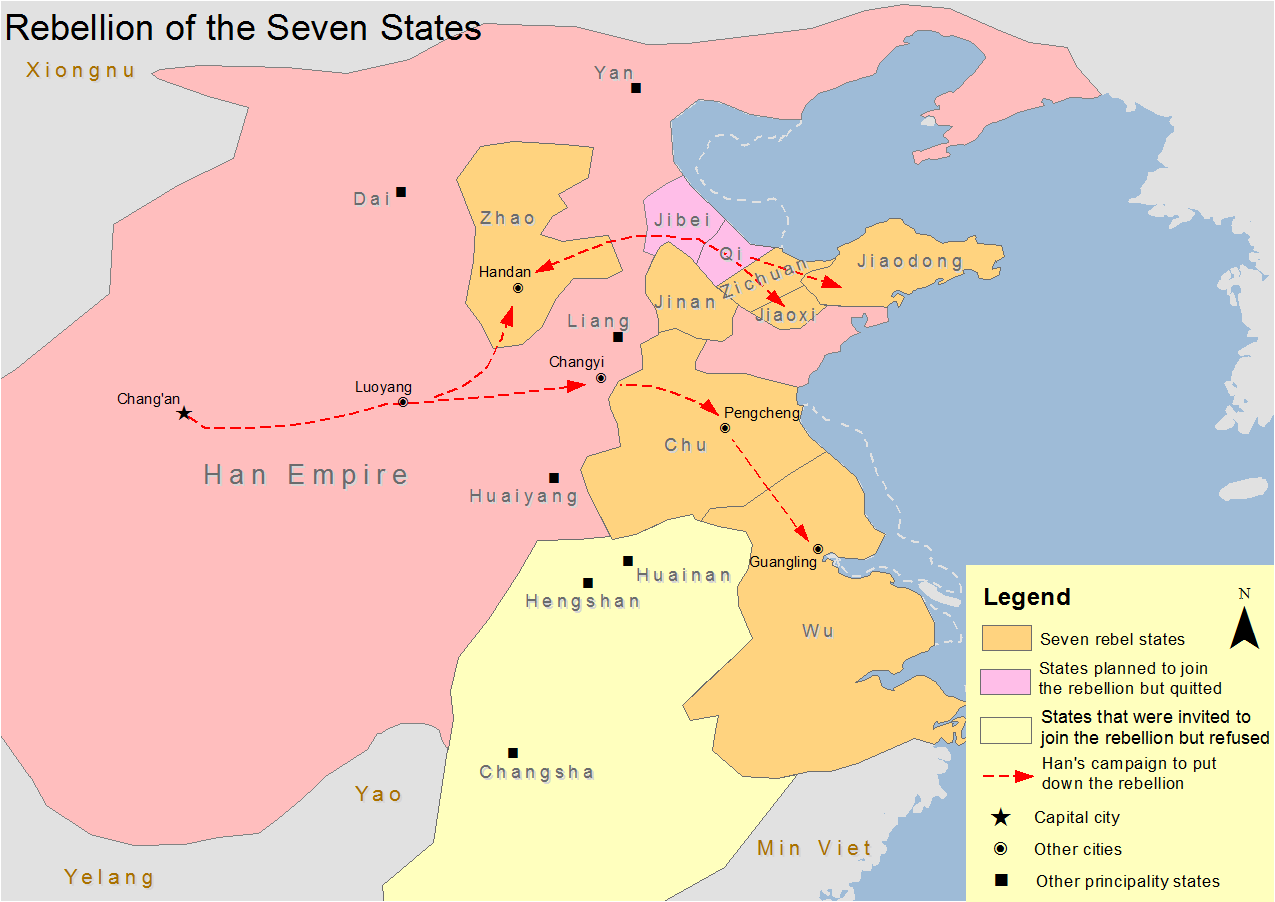
Map showing the rebellion of seven states. Liu Sui was in charge of the State Zhao

Liu Sui (simplified Chinese: 刘遂; traditional Chinese: 劉遂; died 154 BC) was the son of Liu You. When Emperor Wen of Han ascended to the throne in 180 BC, Sui was made the Prince of Zhao in place of Lü Lu while other relatives were given other principalities to rule at the end of Lü Clan Disturbance.

During the reign of Emperor Jing of Han, key advisor Chao Cuo suggested that the emperor use past ignored offences committed by the princes to reduce size of their lands, and Sui lost the Changshan Commandery in this process. Out of anger at this decision by the emperor, Sui was persuaded to join the Rebellion of the Seven States. He allied with the Xiongnu forces and battled general Li Ji's forces. The Zhao forces were eventually wiped out by general Luan Bu followed by his conquest in the Qi state regions, and Sui committed suicide.

Prince of Zhao House of Liu Died: 154 BC
Chinese royalty
Preceded by Lü Lu	Prince of Zhao; 180 BC – 154 BC	Succeeded by Liu Pengzu
