= Nabis of Sparta =

Last king of Sparta from 207 to 192 BC

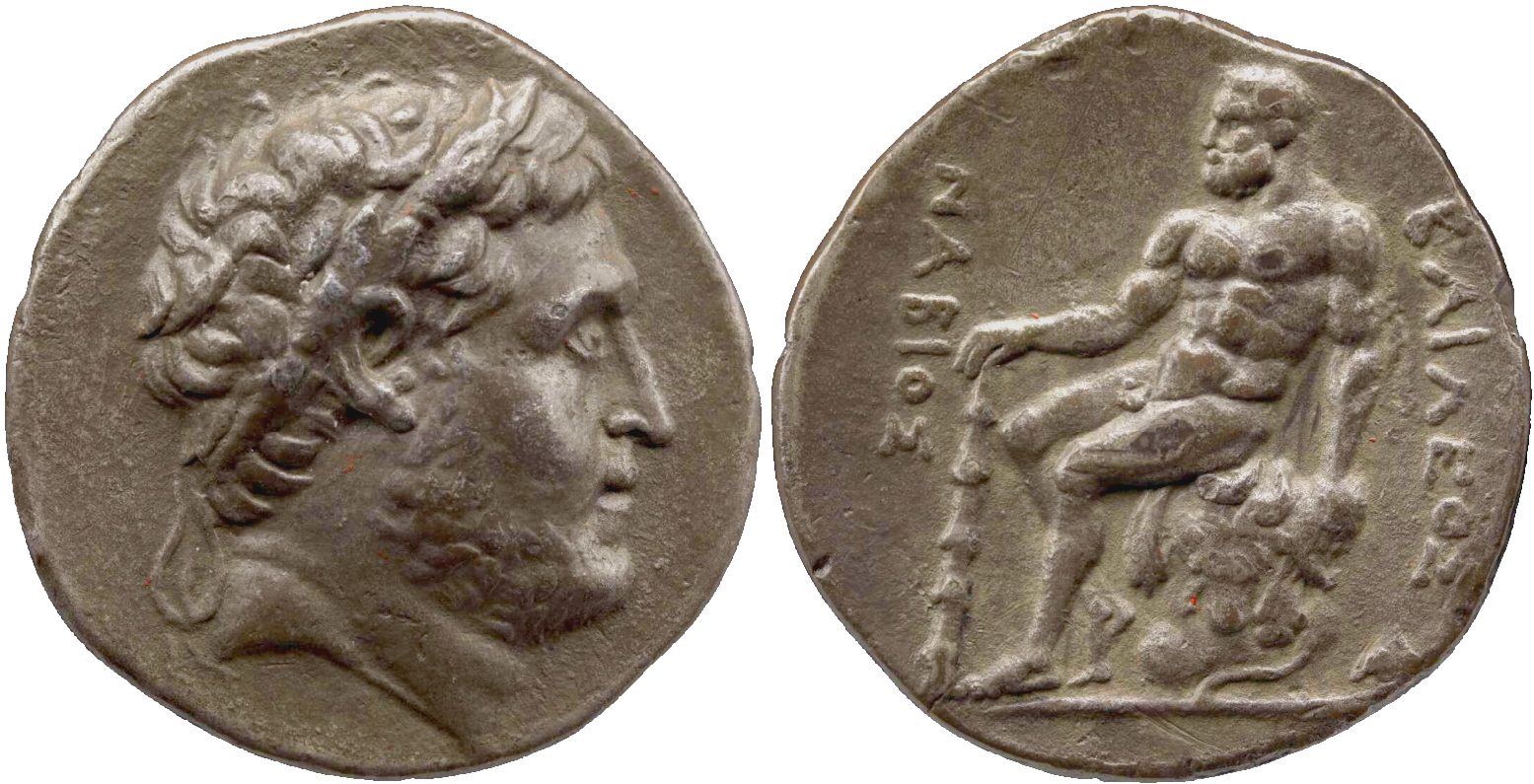
Tetradrachm of Nabis, with his portrait under the guise of Heracles, who is also pictured seated on the reverse. The legend reads "of king Nabis" in Doric Greek (ΒΑΙΛΕΟΣ ΝΑΒΙΟΣ). The coin is in the collection of the British Museum.

Nabis (Ancient Greek: Νάβις) was the last king of independent Sparta. He was probably a member of the Heracleidae, and he ruled from 207 BC to 192 BC, during the years of the First and Second Macedonian Wars and the "War against Nabis" named for being against him. After taking the throne by executing two claimants, he began rebuilding Sparta's power. During the Second Macedonian War, Nabis sided with King Philip V of Macedon and in return he received the city of Argos. However, when the war began to turn against the Macedonians, he defected to Rome. After the war, the Romans, urged by the Achaean League, attacked Nabis and defeated him. He then was assassinated in 192 BC by the Aetolian League. He represented the last phase of Sparta's reformist period.

== Sources ==
Nabis is cited by many ancient authors: Livy, Plutarch, Pausanias, Diodorus of Sicily, Justin, Eutropius and Zonaras. However, they ultimately all derive from Polybius of Megalopolis, a Greek historian of the 2nd century BC, who mostly lived as a hostage in Rome, where he composed The Histories in 40 books, now partially lost. Polybius is treated as a historian whose takes are balanced, however his account is viewed by scholars as biased because he deeply hated Sparta and Nabis. Firstly, his home city of Megalopolis was besieged by Sparta several times and even destroyed by the Spartan king Cleomenes III in 223. Secondly, Polybius' father Lycortas was one of the leaders of the Achaean League, the hereditary enemy of Sparta during these years. Polybius was also a conservative politician, and Nabis' social program of land redistribution and mass manumissions revolted him. Finally, during his Roman captivity, Polybius befriended several prominent Roman statesmen and came to support Rome against its enemies, among whom was Nabis. Since every ancient author reproduced Polybius, Nabis is universally described in ancient sources as a tyrant of the worst kind, bloodthirsty and sacrilegious. The myth of Nabis' iron maiden came from Polybius as well, while it is dismissed by modern scholars; Paul Cartledge describes it as a "overheated fantasy".

Apart from the literary evidence, a few epigraphical sources give some information on Nabis and his reign, as well as his coinage and several inscriptions found in Sparta.

== Family background ==
Ancient sources are silent on the origins of Nabis, which led to a wealth of theories, describing him as either a former helot, a mercenary, a perioecus, an impoverished Spartiate, or an aristocrat. An inscription found in Delos at the end of the 19th century AD citing "Nabis, son of Demaratos" led the epigraphist Théophile Homolle to conclude that Nabis was a descendant of the Eurypontid Spartan king Demaratos (r. c.515–491), who had been forced into exile by the other king, the Agiad Cleomenes I c. 491. The former king settled in Asia, where his descent can episodically be tracked down to the third century, when the family returned to Sparta.

Nabis was born c.250–45. As a member of the Eurypontid dynasty, the young Nabis must have cooperated with the Agiad king Cleomenes III to survive his reign (235–222), since Cleomenes repeatedly murdered or exiled his opponents.

The name of Nabis is peculiar and the only occurrence among Spartan names. It is possibly the Greek version of the Hebraic word nabi, which means prophet. Jean-Georges Texier suggests that Nabis is an additional name that he received at the contact of Jews in Egypt, where he might have fled alongside Cleomenes III after his defeat at Sellasia in 222.

In 225, Cleomenes III seized the city of Argos, thanks to the connivance of its tyrant Aristomachos II. It is probably at this time that Nabis married Aristomachos' niece Apia, in a move to seal the alliance between the two cities. Nabis and Apia had at least two sons and one daughter, of whom only their son Armenas is known by name.

== Reign ==
=== Hellenistic king ===
After the defeat of Cleomenes III at Sellasia in 222, it took three years for Sparta to appoint two new kings: the Eurypontid Lycurgus and the Agiad Agesipolis III, who was a minor. In 217, Lycurgus forced the boy Agesipolis to go into exile and reigned alone. Lycurgus died at some point before 209, and was succeeded by his son Pelops, but as he was also a minor, a regent named Machanidas might have acted in his name. Machanidas was however defeated by the Achaean League at the Battle of Mantinea in 207, during which he was slain by the Achaean leader Philopoemen.

Nabis took power after the death of Machanidas. Diodorus of Sicily claims that he murdered Pelops, but it is more likely that he was already dead by that time; perhaps he confused Nabis with Machanidas. It seems that Nabis' accession was unopposed. He assumed the title of king (basileus) as mentioned on his coins and on some roof tiles found in Sparta. While Cleomenes had retained the appearance of the traditional Spartan constitution, Nabis got rid of all its elements (the Gerousia, ecclesia, ephors, and dyarchy) and ruled as an absolute monarch, akin to the other Hellenistic kings. He maintained a pomp that had hitherto been alien to Spartans, by living in a palace, keeping a stable of parade horses, and perhaps dressing with a purple mantle. Nabis also had a permanent bodyguard of mercenaries around him.

Areus had minted coins with his name, but not his portrait; Cleomenes had done the contrary. Nabis was the first Spartan king to mint coins with both his portrait and his name. The reverse of his tetradrachms features a seated Heracles—from whom the Spartan kings claimed descent—perhaps copied from a coin of the Seleucid king Antiochus I struck in Sardis, or from a statue made by Eutychides of Sikyon during the reign of Areus.

=== Building program and economic reforms ===
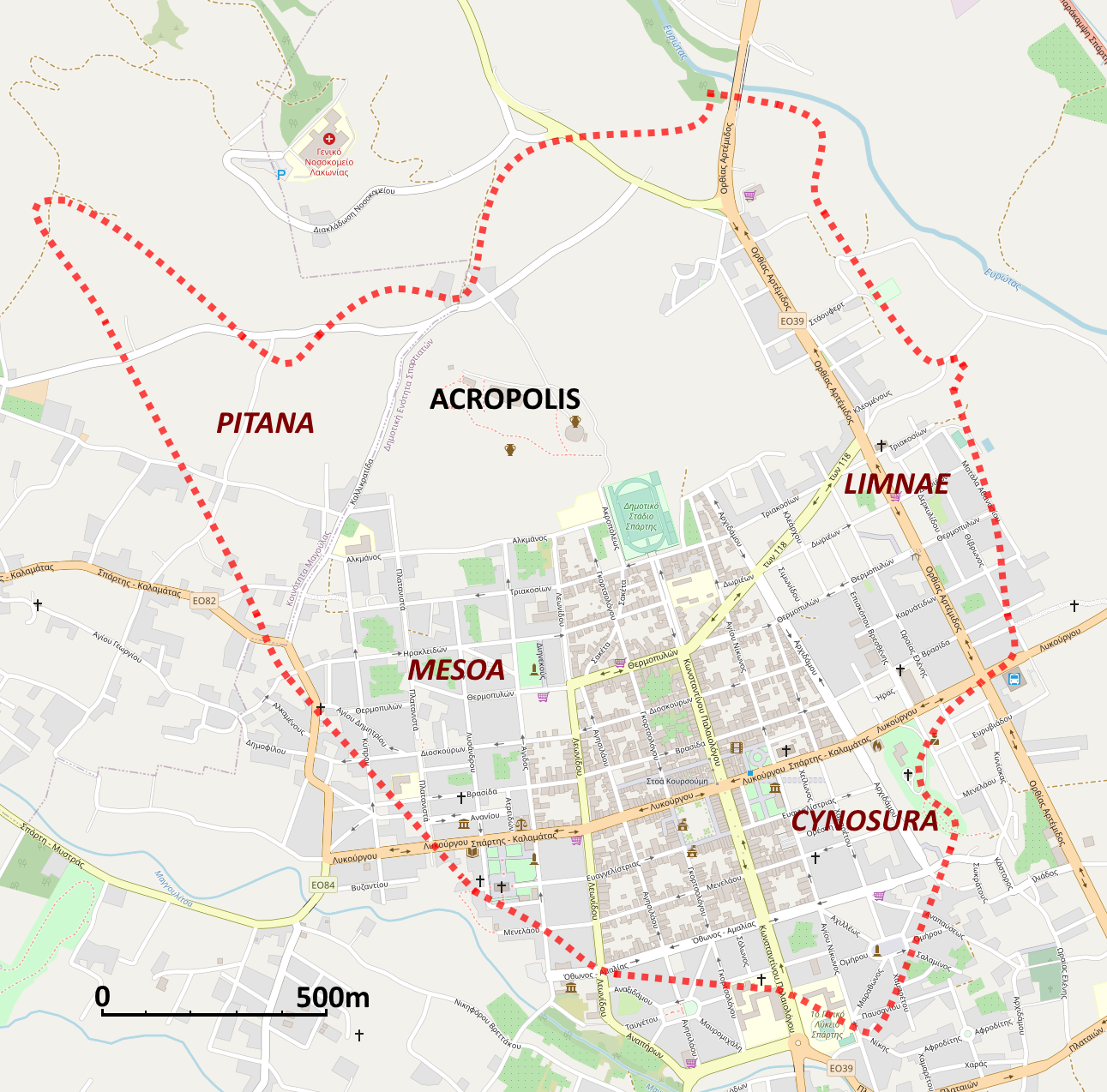
Fortifications built by Nabis over a modern map of Sparta.

During the Classical era, Sparta was famous for not having any wall, but that changed after it became a secondary power. Its first defensive structures date from c.315, but they were mostly palisades. Nabis instead built Sparta's first full fortifications, with stone and brick walls, which enclosed a very large area of about 200 hectares. These walls completed the urbanisation of Sparta, which had remained somewhat unfinished as it was composed of five villages that never fully merged. The roof tiles were stamped with Nabis' name to prevent their theft. An inscription dated from c.200 also mentions a water-commissioner, whose role was likely to make reserves in case of a siege.

Nabis' most controversial part of his reforms was the enfranchisement of slaves, a measure that has been debated by ancient and modern scholars alike. Cleomenes III had already made a mass manumission of 6,000 helots in 222, but it was a desperate action when facing a massive army from Macedonia just before the battle of Sellasia. The evidence is slim, but it seems that Nabis freed many helots as soon as he got into power. However, he might have only freed the helots living on the land of his exiled enemies, as it seems that there were still some helots in Laconia after his reign, and did not enfranchise traditional chattel slaves. He then married some of his freedmen to the wives and daughters of the proscribed, as Spartan women often held vast amount of land. The perioeci, the second-tier citizens of Sparta, were equally rewarded with citizenship.

== Foreign policy ==
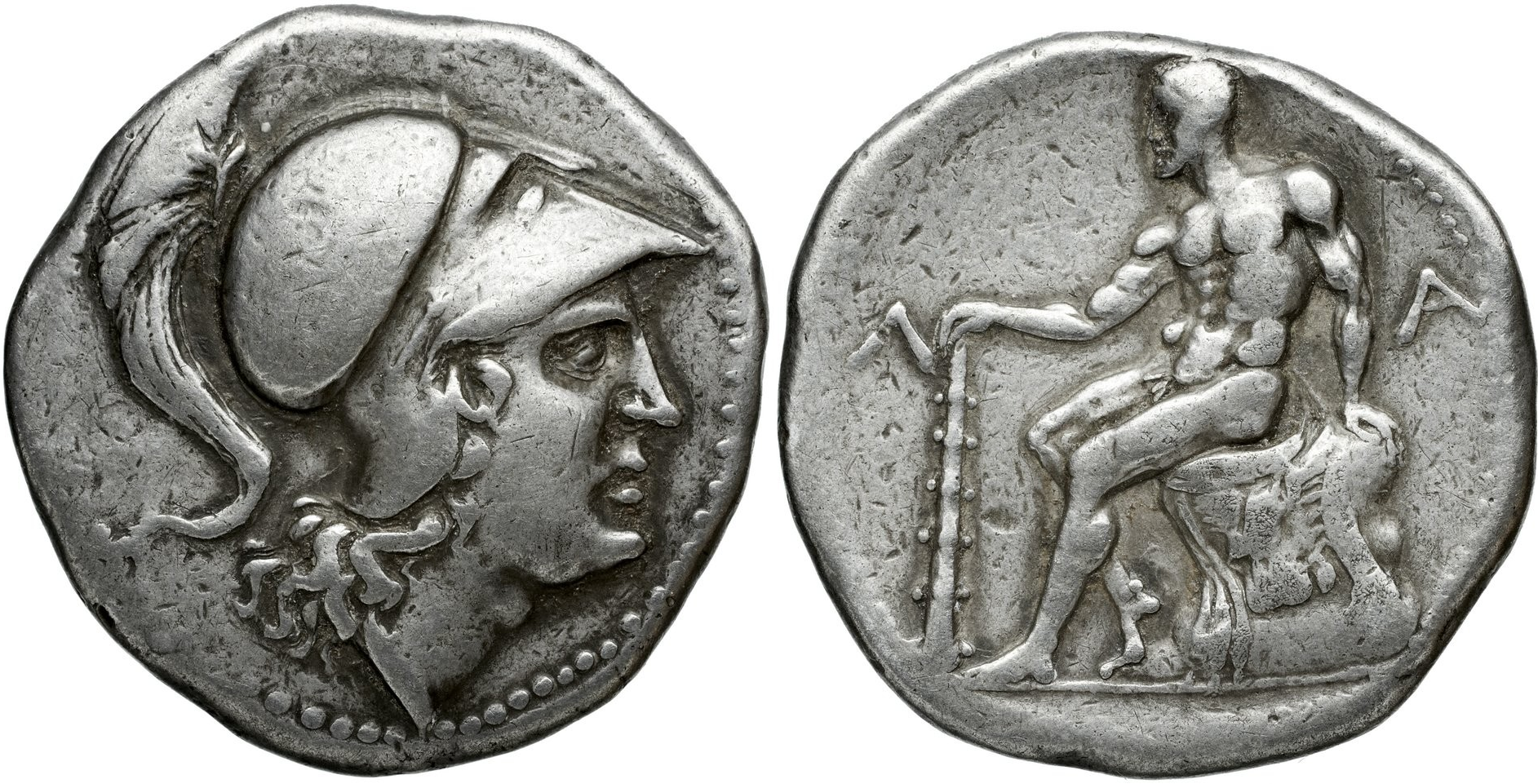
Tetradrachm of Nabis, featuring Athena on the obverse and Heracles on the reverse.

In foreign policy, Nabis pursued much the same policy as his predecessors: opposing the Achaean League and Macedonia by allying himself with the Aetolians, Elis, and Messene. This led him into an alliance with Rome during the First Macedonian War, signing a peace treaty with Rome in 205 at the Peace of Phoenice.

In the following years Nabis expanded Spartan power, reconquering much of Laconia and Messene. In 204 BC, he opened raids on Megalopolis, which did not break out into war until 202. He also re-established a fleet (apparently with the help of Cretan allies, whom Polybius describes as "pirates"), and used it to re-establish control of the Laconian coastline. He also fortified the city of Sparta for the first time (previously, the Spartans had viewed their city's defence as depending on the bravery of their hoplites).

In 201 BC, he invaded the territory of Messene, which had been an ally of Sparta in the previous decades, apparently an attempt to re-establish the control which Sparta had had over the region until the mid 4th century BC. Messene fell to Nabis, but the Spartans were forced to retreat when the army of Philopoemen intervened. Nabis' forces were decisively defeated at Tegea and he was forced to check his expansionist ambitions for the time.

Nabis' territorial ambitions brought him into conflict with the Achaean League, which controlled the northern half of the Peloponnese. Although repeatedly defeated by the gifted Achaean strategos Philopoemen, he nevertheless remained a serious threat to the Achaeans, who were considerably less successful against him when led by less competent generals. In 200 BC, alarmed at the ease with which he was ravaging their territory, the Achaeans asked the Macedonian King Philip V for help, which he did not provide. In the following years, Nabis was able to skilfully exploit the conflict between Philip and the Romans, gaining control of the important city of Argos as the price of his alliance with the Macedonians, and then defecting to the soon to be victorious Romans so that he might hold on to his conquest.

== War with Rome ==
In 195 BC, however, the Roman proconsul Titus Quinctius Flamininus was persuaded by the Achaeans that the power of Nabis in the Peloponnese needed to be checked. Flamininus ordered Nabis to give Argos back to the Achaeans, or face war with Rome. When Nabis refused, citing the Roman acceptance of his friendship at a time when he had already been in possession of the city as justification, Flamininus invaded Laconia. After an inconclusive campaign the Spartans were defeated, and Nabis was forced to surrender both Argos and the port of Gytheum, which gave him access to the sea.

== Recovery and death ==
Though the territory under his control now consisted only of the city of Sparta and its immediate environs, Nabis still hoped to regain his former power. In 192 BC, seeing that the Romans and their Achaean allies were distracted by the imminent war with King Antiochus III of the Seleucid Empire and the Aetolian League, Nabis attempted to recapture Gytheum and the Laconian coastline. Initially, he was successful, capturing the port and defeating the Achaean League in a minor naval battle.

Soon after, however, his army was routed by Philopoemen and shut up within the walls of Sparta. After ravaging the surrounding countryside Philopoemen returned home. Within a few months Nabis appealed to the Aetolian League to send troops so that he might protect his territory against the Romans and the Achaean League.

The Aetolians responded by sending an army of 1,000 infantry and 30 cavalry to Sparta. Once there, however, the Aetolians betrayed the tyrant – assassinating him while he was drilling his army outside the city. The Aetolians then attempted to take control of the city but were prevented from doing so by an uprising of the citizens.

The Achaeans, seeking to take advantage of the ensuing chaos, dispatched Philopoemen to Sparta with a large army. Once there he compelled the Spartans to join the Achaean League. Nabis had thus been the last leader of an independent Sparta, and the last ruler under whom the Spartans had been a major power in Greece.

== Sources ==
=== Primary sources ===
- Titus Livius (Livy), The History of Rome, trans Rev. Canon Roberts. London J. M. Dent & Sons, Ltd, 1905.
- Polybius, translated by Frank W. Walbank, (1979). The Rise of the Roman Empire. New York: Penguin Classics. ISBN 0-14-044362-2.

=== Secondary sources ===
- Paul Cartledge and Antony Spawforth, (2002). Hellenistic and Roman Sparta: A tale of two cities. London: Routledge. ISBN 0-415-26277-1
- A. M. Eckstein, "Nabis and Flamininus on the Argive Revolutions of 198 and 197 B.C.", Greek, Roman, and Byzantine Studies, Vol. 28 No. 2 (1987), pp. 213233.
- Maurice Holleaux, (1930). Cambridge Ancient History: Rome and the Mediterranean; 218-133 B.C., (1st edition) Vol VIII. Los Angeles: Cambridge University Press.
- Théophile Homolle, "Le roi Nabis", Bulletin de Correspondance Hellénique, 20, 1896, pp. 502–522.
- Oliver D. Hoover, Handbook of Coins of the Peloponnesos: Achaia, Phleiasia, Sikyonia, Elis, Triphylia, Messenia, Lakonia, Argolis, and Arkadia, Sixth to First Centuries BC [The Handbook of Greek Coinage Series, Volume 5], Lancaster/London, Classical Numismatic Group, 2011. ISBN 0980238773
- Jones, A.H.M. (1967). Sparta. Oxford: Basil Blackwell.
- Bernard Legras & Jacqueline Christien, Dialogues d'histoire ancienne Supplément N° 11, Sparte hellénistique, IVe-IIIe siècles avant notre ère, Presses universitaires de Franche-Comté, 2014. ISBN 978-2-84867-493-3
- Olga Palagia, "Art and Royalty in Sparta of the 3rd Century B.C.", Hesperia, 75 (2006), pp. 205–217.
- William Smith, (1873). Dictionary of Greek and Roman Biography and Mythology. London: John Murray.
- Jean-Georges Texier, Nabis, Paris, Les Belles Lettres, 1975.
- Frank William Walbank, A Commentary on Polybius, Oxford University Press, 1979.

Preceded by Pelops	Usurper Eurypontid King of Sparta; 206–192 BC	Succeeded by Achaean League
