= Consort Qi (Han dynasty) =

Han dynasty concubine (c.224 – 194 BC)

- Born: 224? BC
- Died: 194 BC
- Spouse: Emperor Gaozu of Han
- Issue: Liu Ruyi

Consort Qi
- Chinese: 戚姬
Transcriptions
Standard Mandarin
- Hanyu Pinyin: Qī Jī

Lady Qi
- Chinese: 戚夫人
Transcriptions
Standard Mandarin
- Hanyu Pinyin: Qī Fūrén

Consort Qi (Note: The personal name "Yi" (懿) isn't recorded in history; it comes from a work by Bo Yang. Bo in turn did not cite where he got the name from.)(224? – 194 BC), also known as Lady Qi, was a consort of Emperor Gaozu, founder of the Han dynasty.

== Biography ==
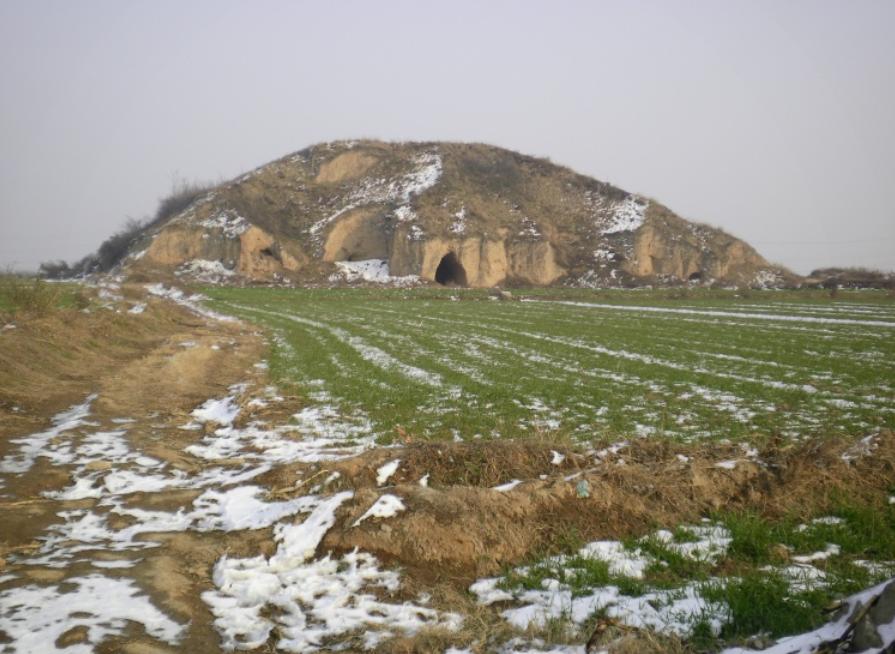
The tomb of Concubine Qi, buried near Emperor Gaozu, in Xianyang, Shaanxi

Most of the information about Lady Qi comes from sources whose accuracy might be in question and authors known for hyperbole. Her rival, Empress Lü Zhi, was used to symbolize the supposed dangers of women in power; thus, Lady Qi and her alleged fate have been formed into a rhetorical tool.

Qi was born in Dingtao, Shandong. She bore Emperor Gaozu a son Liu Ruyi, who was later installed as Prince of Zhao. Gaozu felt that the crown prince Liu Ying, the future Emperor Hui of Han (his second son) was an unsuitable heir to his throne. He tried several times, fruitlessly, to replace Liu Ying with Liu Ruyi, over the objections of Liu Ying's mother, Empress Lü Zhi. Because of this, Lü Zhi hated Qi deeply. Nevertheless, Gaozu ordered Liu Ruyi to proceed to his principality of Zhao (capital in present-day Handan, Hebei) on his deathbed. Qi did not accompany Liu Ruyi.

Lü Zhi became the empress dowager when her son Liu Ying succeeded to the throne as Emperor Hui after Gaozu's death, and moved to dispatch Qi and Liu Ruyi. The empress dowager had Qi arrested and treated her like a convict (dressed in prison garb, head shaved, and in stocks). She then summoned Liu Ruyi to the capital Chang'an in an attempt that was initially resisted by Liu Ruyi's chief of staff Zhou Chang (周昌), whom she respected because he was one of the officials who insisted on Liu Ying being the rightful heir. Instead of directly moving against Zhou Chang and Liu Ruyi, Lü Zhi circumvented Zhou by first summoning him to Chang'an, and then summoning Liu Ruyi. She then consummated her plot to put Qi and Liu Ruyi to death, which was documented in Volume 9 of the historical text Records of the Grand Historian as follows:

Emperor Xiaohui (Emperor Hui of Han) kept his step-brother King of Zhao (Liu Ruyi, King Yin of Zhao) by his side in the palace and checked for poison in any aliment delivered to him. Emperor Xiaohui also brought Liu Ruyi with him wherever he went. In one early morning in the twelfth month of the first year of Emperor Xiaohui, the emperor went on a hunting trip; this time King of Zhao was left alone because he could not wake up early. Emperor Xiaohui supposed his mother would not plot against King of Zhao as several months had passed without any occurrence. Nevertheless, Empress Dowager had an assassin force venom down King of Zhao's throat...When the Emperor came back, Liu Ruyi was already dead. She then had Concubine Qi's limbs chopped off, blinded her by gouging out her eyes, cut off her tongue, cut off her nose, cut off her ears, forced her to drink a potion that made her mute, made her dumb with toxins, and locked her in the pigsty, and called her a "human swine" (人彘). Several days after, Emperor Xiaohui saw the "human swine", and after realising who the "human swine" was, the emperor was so sick of his mother's cruelty that he virtually relinquished his authority and indulged in carnal pleasures.

Both Qi and her son died in the first year of Emperor Hui's reign.

== Connection to the game of weiqi ==
According to Xijing Zaji (西京雜記) by Hong Ge, Qi had a maid named Jia Peilan (賈佩蘭) who escaped and later married to a commoner named Duan Ru (段儒) from Fufeng Prefecture (west of present-day Xi'an, Shaanxi). She described Qi as a very beautiful woman, a great songwriter and weiqi player. On the fourth day of the eighth lunar month every year, Qi would play a weiqi game with Emperor Gaozu in the bamboo forest on the north side of the palace. The winner would make a wish that they believed to come true, while the loser would suffer from illness for the year; however the loser can avoid this bad luck by cutting off a strand of hair and praying to the North Star. Qi won every year and wished for good fortune for the Han dynasty.

Jia Peilan is credited in passing out Han dynasty court customs of Double Ninth Festival to commoners.
