= Liu You =

Han prince

Prince of Huaiyang (淮陽王)
- Reign: 196 BC – c. January 194 BC

Prince of Zhao (趙王)
- Reign: c. January 194 BC – 21 February 181 BC
- Predecessor: Liu Ruyi
- Successor: Liu Hui
- Died: 21 February 181 BC; Chang'an
- Spouse: Lady Lü
Posthumous name
- You (幽)
- House: Han dynasty
- Father: Emperor Gaozu of Han

Liu You (simplified Chinese: 刘友; traditional Chinese: 劉友; pinyin: Liú Yǒu; died 21 February 181 BC) was the sixth son of Emperor Gaozu of Han. He was made Prince of Huaiyang in 196 BC, and recreated as Prince of Zhao two years later.

Liu You married Empress Dowager Lü's niece, who found that he was having affairs with secret mistresses. Lady Lü, angered, went to Empress Dowager Lü and claimed that Liu You was speaking of rebelling against the Lü clan after the Empress Dowager's death. The Lü clan, led by the Empress Dowager, had been controlling the imperial court.

The Empress Dowager subsequently summoned Liu You to Chang'an, the capital, and put him under house arrest there without food. While in prison, Liu You made a song cursing the deeds which Empress Dowager Lü had done to the Liu family. He was afraid to commit suicide, ended up starving to death, was buried with commoner rites, and given the posthumous name You (幽).

Prince You of Zhao House of Liu Died: 181 BC
Chinese royalty
New creation	Prince of Huaiyang; 196 BC – 194 BC	Vacant Title next held by Liu Jiang
Preceded by Liu Ruyi	Prince of Zhao; 194 BC – 181 BC	Succeeded by Liu Hui
