= Lycurgus (king of Sparta) =

King of Sparta

Lycurgus (Ancient Greek: Λυκοῦργος Lykurgos; fl. 219–217 BC) was a king of Sparta, who reigned from 219 BC until his death shortly before 211 BC. Of obscure background and possibly of non-royal descent, Lycurgus led Sparta in the Social War against Macedon with varying success, and underwent multiple exiles during his checkered reign. He also effectively abolished the traditional Spartan diarchy by dethroning his fellow king Agesipolis III and ruling Sparta as its sole monarch.

== Life ==
In 219 BC, after the death of the exiled king Cleomenes III in Egypt, the Spartans restored their traditional diarchy, installing Cleomenes's underaged grandnephew Agesipolis III as the king from the Agiad dynasty and an obscure Lycurgus as representative of the Eurypontid dynasty. According to the historian Polybius, Lycurgus was not in fact of royal descent, and had made good his claim to the throne by bribing the ephors with one silver talent each. Modern historians have doubted this story, however, and suggest that Lycurgus may have indeed belonged to an obscure collateral branch of the ancient Eurypontid family.

Lycurgus was a prominent figure in the Social War against Macedon and the Achaean League. In the summer of 219 BC, he invaded the eastern foreland of the Parnon and took several towns, and then, after marching back to the northern Laconian border, captured the Athenaeum fortress near Megalopolis. The garrison he left there, however, was soon expelled by Macedonian reinforcements during the winter. Shortly afterwards, Lycurgus fled to Pellana to escape the coup attempt of one Chilon, who murdered all the ephors and attempted to revive the land redistribution programs of Cleomenes III, apparently aiming to claim royal power for himself. Lycurgus retook power within the year and, in the early summer of 218 BC, renewed his campaigns against Macedon's Peloponnesian allies. Lycurgus besieged and captured Tegea, but an invasion of Messenia was unsuccessful, and Laconia itself was soon overrun by Macedonian forces. After unsuccessfully counterattacking a Messenian detachment and failing to prevent Macedon from capturing the Menelaion, Lycurgus was denounced by the ephors and once again went into exile, fleeing to Aetolia.

As the war continued, Lycurgus was soon recalled by the following year's ephors, and, in agreement with the allied Aetolian League's general at Elis, he attacked Messenia again. The invasion was once again fruitless, and the war was ended in the summer of 217 BC by a peace agreement concluded at Naupactus. Lycurgus eventually, perhaps right after the peace treaty, dethroned his fellow diarch Agesipolis III and became, for the first time in history, Sparta's sole king. By 211 BC he had been succeeded by his "propagandistically-named" son, Pelops.

Vacant Title last held by Cleomenes III; Eucleidas	Eurypontid King of Sparta; 219 – before 211 BC	Succeeded by Pelops
