= Battle of Mantinea (207 BC) =

Sparta vs Achaean League, part of the First Macedonian War

Coordinates: 37.6°N 22.4°E

- Part of the First Macedonian War
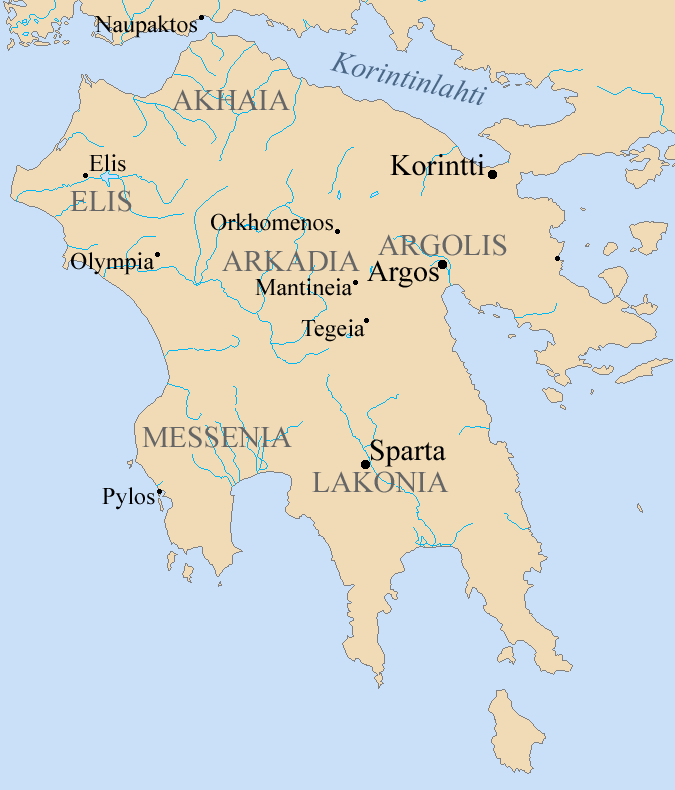
- Map of Peloponnese, a peninsula of Greece.
Date	207 BC
Location	Mantinea
Result	Achaean League victory

Belligerents
Achaean League	Sparta

Commanders and leaders
Philopoemen	Machanidas †

The Battle of Mantinea was fought in 207 BC between Sparta under the tyrant Machanidas, as part of the Aetolian League, and the Achaean League whose forces were led by Philopoemen. Both sides were supplemented by mercenaries. It was the major land battle in Greece of the First Macedonian War, which had occurred due to Macedonian alliance with Carthage in the aftermath of Hannibal's victory at the Battle of Cannae in the Second Punic War.

Machanidas and his mercenaries routed Philopoemen's mercenaries and chased them from the field. They pursued too eagerly. When Machanidas led his men back to the main battle the outnumbered Spartan infantry had been defeated and the Achaeans had entrechnced themselves behind a water filled ditch. Leading his men in an assault on the Achaeans, Machanidas fell from his horse as he attempted to leap over the ditch and was slain. The Achaeans, allies of Macedonia, were victorious.
