= Cenomani =

The Gaulish name Cenomani can refer to:

- Aulerci Cenomani, an ancient Gallic tribe dwelling around modern Le Mans
- Cenomani (Cisalpine Gaul), an ancient Gallic tribe dwelling in Cisalpine Gaul
- Cenomani (Narbonensis), an ancient Gallic tribe dwelling near modern Marseille
