= Lex Oppia =

Ancient Roman law

The Lex Oppia was a law established in ancient Rome in 215 BC, at the height of the Second Punic War during the days of national catastrophe after the Battle of Cannae, and repealed in 195 BC.

Instituted by Marcus Oppius, a tribune of the plebs during the consulship of Quintus Fabius Maximus Verrucosus and Tiberius Sempronius Gracchus, the Lex Oppia was the first of a series of sumptuary laws, and it restricted not only a woman's wealth, but also her display of wealth. Specifically, it forbade any woman to possess more than half an ounce of gold, to wear a multi-colored garment (particularly those trimmed in purple), or to ride in an animal-drawn vehicle in the city or any town or within a mile thereof, except in the case of public religious festivals.

In his Ab urbe condita (From the founding of the city) book 34 Livy discusses the abolishment of the Lex Oppia from the perspective of Cato the Elder and Lucius Valerius.

== Origin ==
The Lex Oppia had been primarily an economic measure in response to serious financial issues during the Second Punic War. However, the restrictions it imposed laid the framework for later sumptuary legislation designed to control expenditure on extravagance for social rather than economic reasons. Notable sumptuary legislation passed after the Lex Oppia's creation includes the Lex Fannia of 161 BC and the Lex Didia of 143 BC. The Lex Fannia was a statute that limited dinner expenditure, the kind of food that could be offered and the number of guests, while the Lex Didia was an application of the Lex Fannia to the entire Italian peninsula that imposed sanctions on providers of, as well as guests at, illegal dinners.

The basis for concern about luxury and extravagance was mixed. It was a universal assumption that indulgence in luxury could undermine traditional military virtues. In his satire book six, Juvenal writes that Rome's excessive wealth from conquest caused the spread of luxury, leading to the downfall of Roman values and morals. A devotion to luxury was considered to be a stimulus to greed, and thus a major contributor to the increase in corruption. Finally, there was a widespread tendency to correlate lavish and self-indulgent expenditures with uneconomical use of personal or family fortunes.

== Repeal ==
Following the Second Punic War, with Rome victorious over Carthage, wealth from the conquered areas began to flow into the hands of the Roman ruling class, transforming their lives from one of traditional agrarian simplicity to ostentatious display and unbounded extravagance. The victory made wealthier Romans aware of the possibilities of different, more comfortable life styles, and gave them access to more varied, more exotic and more luxurious products. During this period, there was an inevitable change of mores, which in practice meant largely the conduct of individuals in the upper strata of Roman society; and with the financial woes eliminated, there was no longer a reason for women to restrict their expenditures. With Rome rich in Carthaginian wealth, attempts to check self-indulgent expenditure with sumptuary legislation proved vain. Consequently, two tribunes of the plebs, Marcus Fundanius and Lucius Valerius, proposed repealing the Lex Oppia.

The supporters of the Lex Oppia were led by two tribunes of the plebs, Marcus Junius Brutus and Publius Junius Brutus, and consul Marcus Porcius Cato, also known as Cato the Elder, who had been elected in 195 BC. Cato argued that the law removed the shame of poverty because it made all women dress in an equal fashion. Cato insisted that if women could engage in a clothes-contest, they would either feel shame in the presence of other women, or on the contrary, they would delight in a rather base victory as a result of extending themselves beyond their means. He also declared that a woman's desire to spend money was a disease that could not be cured, but only restrained; the removal of Lex Oppia, Cato said, would render society helpless in limiting the expenditures of women. Cato pronounced that Roman women already corrupted by luxury were like wild animals who have once tasted blood in the sense that they can no longer be trusted to restrain themselves from rushing into an orgy of extravagance. Cato also chastises the men for letting their women sway them into repealing the law and affirms that its abrogation will cause the spread of luxury.

The proponents of abolishing the Lex Oppia were led by Marcus Fundanius and Lucius Valerius, as well as the other consul, Lucius Valerius Flaccus, elected in 195 BC. Flaccus contested Cato's assumption that there would be no rivalry among women if they did not own anything by reminding the audience of the suffering and anger Roman women feel when they see the wives of Latin allies wearing ornaments of which they have been deprived. Lucius Valerius Flaccus had further argued that the Lex Oppia was only an emergency temporary law passed after the disastrous defeat of Roman soldiers in Cannae by Hannibal. As such, he argues, it was never meant to keep women's spending and morality in check. Lucius Valerius also states that the privileges allotted to Roman women are already limited compared to Roman men; why restrict them further.

feminis dumtaxat purpurae usu interdicemus?
et cum tibi viro liceat purpura in vestem stragulam uti,
matrem familiae tuam purpureum amiculum habere non sines,
et equus tuus speciosius instratus erit quam uxor vestita?

Will we forbid women the use of purple?
And although you, a man, are allowed to use purple for the blanket on your bed,
will you not allow your wife to have a purple cloak?
Even your horse will be more beautifully arrayed than your wife is clothed.

Lucius Valerius rebukes Cato the Elder. From the Ab Urbe Condita book 35.7.

As nobles spoke for or against the repeal of the Lex Oppia, the matrons of Rome crowded the Capitol. As Livy writes, the women could not be kept indoors by either the authority of the magistrates or the orders of their husbands or their own sense of propriety ("nec auctoritate, nec uerecundia"). They blocked all the streets of the city and the approaches to the Forum, and implored the men as they descended to the Forum to allow the women to resume their former adornments. After the speeches against and in favor of the Lex Oppia, the women poured into the streets the next day in greater numbers and besieged the doors of the two Brutuses. The dissenting tribunes eventually gave in to the persistent demanding of the Roman matrons, and the Lex Oppia was repealed in 195 BC.

== See also ==
- Roman law
- List of Roman laws
