= Lucius Furius Purpureo =

Roman politician and general, consul in 196 BCE

Lucius Furius Purpureo was a Roman politician and general, becoming consul in the year 196 BC. Lucius Furius was from the gens Furia patrician family in Rome.

== Military tribune ==
Purpureo was a military tribune in 210 BC during the Second Punic War. After the Battle of Numistro against Hannibal, he was left behind in charge of the wounded with a small number of guards, while the consul Marcus Claudius Marcellus pursued the enemy.

== Praetor ==
He was a praetor in 200 BC and received Cisalpine Gaul as his province. Shortly after he arrived in Cisalpine Gaul with 5,000 Latin troops, about 40,000 Insubres, Cenomani, and Boii, led by the Carthaginian general, Hamilcar, plundered Placentia and besieged Cremona. Upon learning of the invasion, Purpureo requested more troops from Rome. The Senate responded by sending him a new army of two Roman legions and a similar number of Latin troops. After sending his original 5,000 troops to Etruria, Purpureo proceeded to raise the siege at Cremona. He gained a brilliant victory. Over 35,000 Gauls were killed or taken prisoner, and Hamilcar and three Gallic chiefs fell in the battle. The senate voted three days of thanksgiving in consequence of the victory, and the honor of a triumph was granted to him.

The following year, Purpureo was a deputy of the proconsul Publius Sulpicius Galba during peace talks with Macedonia and their ambassadors. Not much was achieved at this meeting and the Macedonians tried to convince the Aetolians, a Roman ally, to break their alliance and join Macedonia. This event ensured that no peace was concluded and both sides continued to fight.

== Consul of 196 BC ==
In 196 BC, Purpureo was Consul with Marcus Claudius Marcellus. Both assigned to Cisalpine Gaul, they, together and separately, forced the Boii and other native tribes into submission. On their return to Rome, Marcellus celebrated a triumph.

== Family ==
Lucius Furius Purpureo was the son of Spurius Furius Purpureo. It is known that Purpureo was a descendant of Marcus Furius Camillus and had a son of his own namesake who served as Legatus in Aetolia in 200 BC under Publius Sulpicius Galba.

Political offices
Preceded by Gaius Cornelius Cethegus and Quintus Minucius Rufus	Consul of the Roman Republic with Marcus Claudius Marcellus; 196 BC	Succeeded by Lucius Valerius Flaccus and Marcus Porcius M.f. Cato
