= Pleminia gens =

Ancient Roman family

The gens Pleminia was a minor plebeian family at ancient Rome. The only member of this gens mentioned in history is Quintus Pleminius, infamous for his outrageous conduct at Locri during the Second Punic War. Other Pleminii are known from inscriptions.

== Members ==
This list includes abbreviated praenomina. For an explanation of this practice, see filiation.

- Quintus Pleminius, legate of Scipio Africanus in 205 BC, he took the town of Locri, and was appointed legatus pro praetore. His brutal treatment of the inhabitants, plundering of the temple of Proserpina, and murder of two military tribunes led to his arrest, but he died before his trial. (Note: Or, according to an account reported by Clodius Licinius, he was put to death by the senate's orders after attempting to burn the city.)
- Gaius Pleminius, the husband and heir of Maria Prisca, donated four thousand sestertii to Fortuna at the present site of Sloughia, formerly part of Africa Proconsularis.
- Lucius Pleminius L. f. Crescens, the son of Lucius Pleminius Profoturus and Marciana, and brother of Lucius Pleminius Profoturus Junior.
- Pleminius Donatus, dedicated a tomb at Ammaedara to his wife, Junia Fructuosa, who died aged twenty-two years and eleven months.
- Pleminia Januaria, buried at the present site of Ain Kissa, formerly part of Numidia.
- Pleminia Ɔ l. Pampila, a freedwoman, and the wife of Gaius Laterninus Abinnaeus, according to an inscription from Rome.
- Lucius Pleminius Profuturus, the husband of Marciana, and father of Lucius Pleminius Crescens and Lucius Pleminius Profuturus Junior, buried at Ariminum in Cisalpine Gaul, aged forty-one years, six months, and five days.
- Lucius Pleminius L. f. Profuturus Junior, the son of Lucius Pleminius Profuturus and Marciana, and brother of Lucius Pleminius Crescens.

== See also ==
- List of Roman gentes

== Bibliography ==
- Titus Livius (Livy), History of Rome.
- Valerius Maximus, Factorum ac Dictorum Memorabilium (Memorable Facts and Sayings).
- Appianus Alexandrinus (Appian), Bellum Hannibalicum (The War with Hannibal).
- Lucius Cassius Dio Cocceianus (Cassius Dio), Roman History.
- Dictionary of Greek and Roman Biography and Mythology, William Smith, ed., Little, Brown and Company, Boston (1849).
- Theodor Mommsen et alii, Corpus Inscriptionum Latinarum (The Body of Latin Inscriptions, abbreviated CIL), Berlin-Brandenburgische Akademie der Wissenschaften (1853–present).
- René Cagnat et alii, L'Année épigraphique (The Year in Epigraphy, abbreviated AE), Presses Universitaires de France (1888–present).
- T. Robert S. Broughton, The Magistrates of the Roman Republic, American Philological Association (1952).
