= Dorsa Cato =

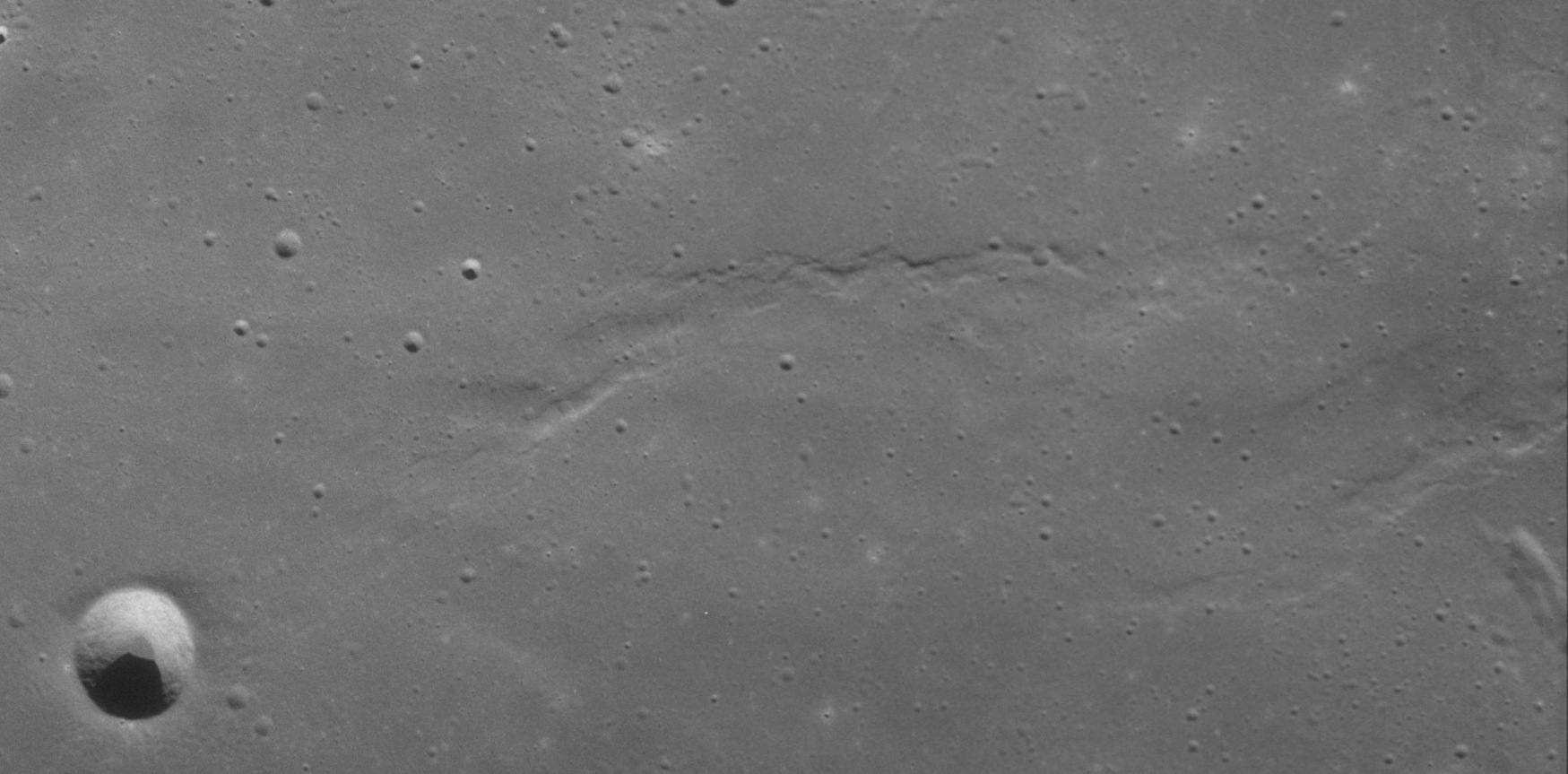
Slightly oblique view from Apollo 11, with north at the right. The crater in lower left is Messier B.

Dorsa Cato is a wrinkle ridge at 1.0°N 47.0°E on the Moon. It is approximately 130 km long and was named after the ancient Roman senator and historian Cato the Elder in 1976 by the IAU.

The dorsa are located north of the prominent Messier crater in Mare Fecunditatis.
