= Gaius Cornelius Cethegus (consul) =

Roman Republic consul in 197 BC

Gaius Cornelius Cethegus was a consul of the Roman Republic in 197 BC.

He became propraetor in Hispania in 200 BC and was elected aedile in absentia. In Hispania he defeated a hostile force in the territory of the Sedetani and 15,000 of the enemy died, although Heitland calls this "a very doubtful story." As an aedile he arranged magnificent games. During his consulate in 197 BC he fought successfully in Gallia Cisalpina against the Insubrians and Cenomani and was awarded a triumph by the senate. He was censor in 194 BC. Along with Scipio Africanus and Marcus Minucius Rufus in 193 BC, he went as a commissioner to mediate an end to the war between Masinissa and Carthage.

== See also ==
- Cornelia gens

Preceded by T. Quinctius Flamininus; Sex. Aelius Paetus Catus	Roman consul 197 BC; With: Q. Minucius Rufus	Succeeded by L. Furius Purpureo; M. Claudius Marcellus
Preceded by Scipio Africanus; P. Aelius Paetus	Roman censor 194 BC; With: Sex. Aelius Paetus Catus	Succeeded by T. Quinctius Flamininus; M. Claudius Marcellus
