= Via Flacca =

Roman road in Latium

The Via Flacca was a Roman road along the western coast of Latium, Italy. It was built under censor Lucius Valerius Flaccus around 184 BC. Parts of it have recently been renovated as a trekking route.

It was probably built to serve the town of Formiae which had been elevated to a municipium, and which the road linked to the towns of Terracina and Gaeta. It was a side branch of the via Appia, the much more famous Roman consular road, which it rejoined after Formiae near the Rialto bridge, and provided an alternative route to avoid the Aurunci mountains. The areas along the coast of Formiae and Caietae were popular resorts and sites of seaside villas of many important rich patricians of Rome, notably the grandiose villa of the emperor Tiberius at Sperlonga.

The road was a difficult and dangerous project as the coastline is mountainous in many places. Livy says: "Flaccus separately built a dam at the Neptunian spring that the people might have a footpath there, and a road over the hill at Formiae..." At the cliffs at Formia, it passes at an altitude of 30–40 m, and is supported by terraces in double polygonal walls with opus caementicium (concrete) to anchor them to the rock.

In the section below Sperlonga wheel ruts in the surface of steep sections of a wheelbase of 0.8 m can be seen.

== Remains ==
The modern road has been built upon the Roman road on most of its route, but from Sant'Agostino beach towards Sperlonga is a track of the old road. At Punta Cetarola, south of Sperlonga, the track is supported by a wall of square and polygonal stone and passes through a natural cave, the Antro di Punta Cetarola, then further north leads to the Torre Capovento.
