= Quintus Minucius Rufus =

Roman senator and military commander

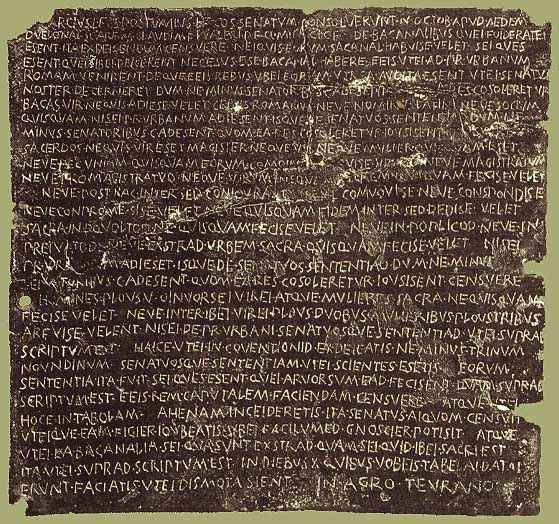
- Senatus consultum de Bacchanalibus CIL I, 581, dated October 7th 186 BC

Roman consul

Quintus Minucius Rufus was a Roman senator and military commander.

== Early career ==
In 211 BC, Minucius was an officer serving under Q. Fulvius Flaccus when Roman forces took back Capua after their defeat the previous year by Hannibal. He was a plebeian aedile in 201.

== Praetorship in Locri ==
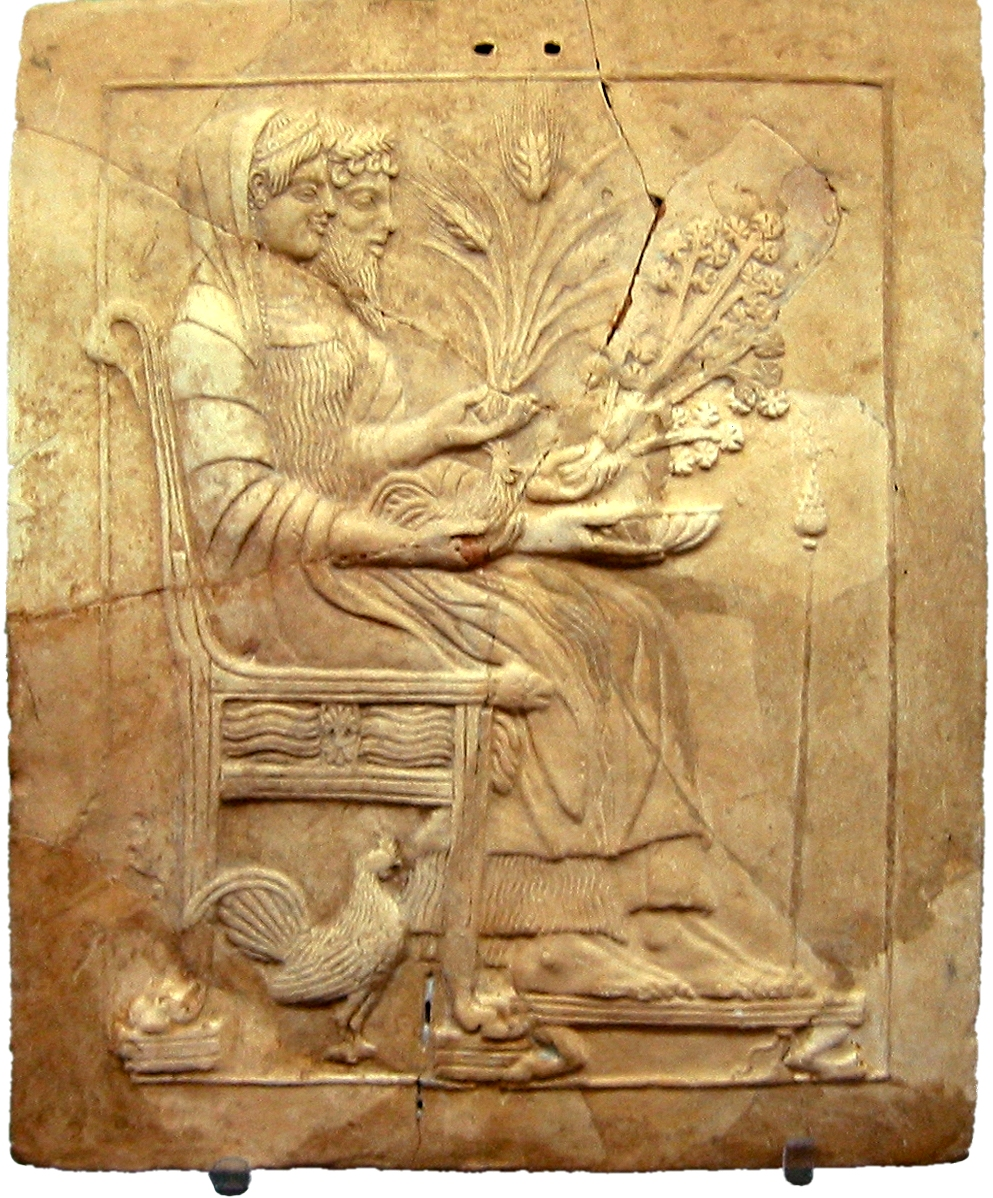
A pinax from Locri depicting Persephone (Roman Proserpina) and Hades (Roman Pluto) enthroned

As praetor in 200, Minucius was assigned to Bruttium (modern-day Calabria), where he investigated thefts from the temple of Proserpina at Locri. His imperium was prorogued as propraetor into 199 so he could continue to look into the sacrilege. The year was plagued by bad omens; Minucius reported two from his province, a foal born with five feet, and three chickens born with three feet each.

In his study of the praetorship during the Republic, T. Corey Brennan has speculated that the prosecution of sacrilege at Bruttium may have been a useful way to out and suppress the "dissident element" in the region; the stated task of Minucius's prorogation was "to complete inquiries into coniurationes among the Bruttii." The word coniuratio during this period carried multiple connotations; literally a "swearing together" or "oath," it could refer both to a ritualized oath-taking and to a political conspiracy. The suppression of the Bacchanalia thirteen years later, recorded by Livy and a bronze tablet inscribed with the Roman Senate's decree, was also described as a series of coniurationes, and demonstrates at least a perceived connection between political dissent and private religious practices. Those whom Minucius arrested at Bruttium for sacrilege were sent to Rome, then returned to Locri with instructions from the senate that they restore the funds taken from the shrine.

== Compromised triumph ==
As consul in 197, Minucius fought against Gauls and Ligurians. Both consuls of this year were assigned military commands in Italy, and coordinated strategically. Minucius advanced to Genua (modern Genoa) and proceeded to Liguria, where he fought a campaign. He then crossed the Apennines and ravaged the country of the Gallic Boii, whose request for aid from the Insubres went unanswered.

Minucius's consular colleague, Cornelius Cethegus, fought against Insubres and Cenomani, but achieved his victory in a single pitched battle that resulted in the mass slaughter of 35,000 men and the capture of 5,200. The reports sent by the two commanders were greeted by a decree of a four-day supplicatio, or thanksgiving, and both presented themselves at the Temple of Bellona to ask jointly for a triumph. Two tribunes, however, came forward to block Minucius's request, and after two days of argument, he withdrew. Cethegus resubmitted his request, which the Roman Senate approved omnium consensu, "with the consent of all." The senate denied Minucius the same honour in part because, Livy says, he had taken no hostages to prove he had captured the number of towns he claimed. It was further alleged that he had lost too many men in a series of battles that had decided little.

Minucius then staged his own triumph over the Boii and Ligurians on the Alban Mount. Although the triumph was registered in the Fasti Triumphales and was carried out with the usual trappings, without senate authorization the triumphator had to present the celebration at his own expense, from booty won at war; this necessity led to accusations that Minucius had appropriated the funds from the public treasury.

== Later life ==
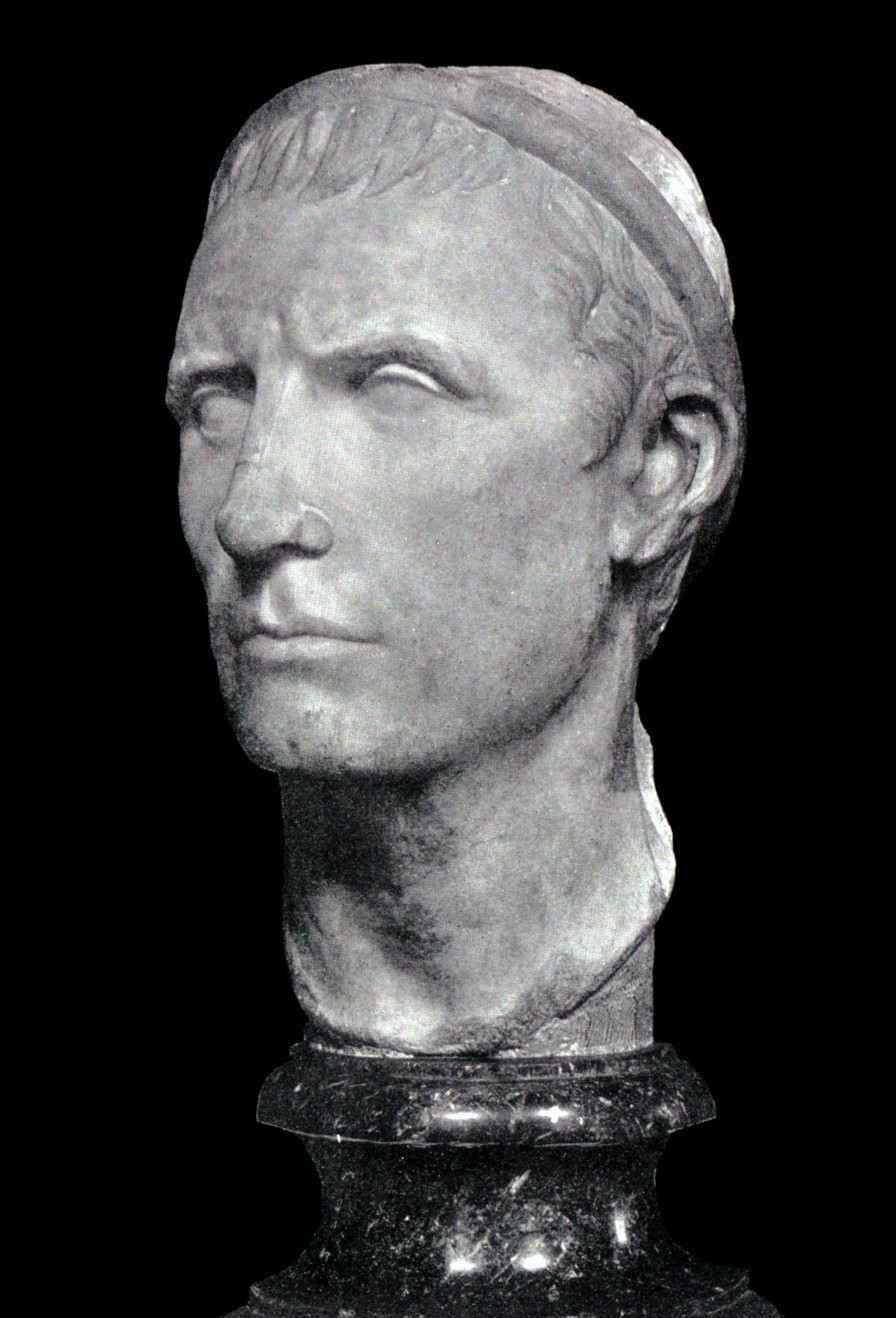
Antiochus

Despite the opposition to his triumph, Minucius continued to have political influence and must have demonstrated skill as an administrator, as he played a role in international negotiations throughout the 180s and possibly again in 174. In the wake of the Galatian War, he was among the ten legati sent in 189–188 BC with the proconsul Manlius Vulso to work out the terms of a treaty with Antiochus. Questions had been raised about Vulso's right to a triumph for his Galatian victories; it was the position of the ten commissioners that he had not been authorized to take action because there had been no official declaration of war by the senate. The controversy indicates an early anxiety that the imperium exercised by a magistrate or pro-magistrate acting abroad could distort power relations within the republican system of government.

In 186 BC Minucius was one of three former consuls mentioned in the senatus consultum de Bacchanalibus, who formed the committee for drawing up the report. In 183, he served on a three-man embassy to Transalpine Gaul to try to prevent the Celts from entering northern Italy. In 174, he may have been the Quintus Minucius who was sent to Crete with ten ships to settle unrest.

Preceded by T. Quinctius Flamininus; Sex. Aelius Paetus Catus	Roman consul 197 BC; With: G. Cornelius Cethegus	Succeeded by L. Furius Purpureo; M. Claudius Marcellus
