= Quintus Pleminius =

Military Legate

Quintus Pleminius was a propraetor (legatus pro praetore) in 205 BC. He was given command over Locri in Bruttium by Scipio Africanus after its recapture, considered the "outstanding event" in Sicilian operations that year. His governorship, if it should be called that, ended in sacrilege and murder.

== Military command ==
Pleminius was in charge of the Roman garrison at Rhegium, the geographical location of which on the "toe" of the Italian Peninsula had made it a de facto part of the province of Sicily. From Rhegium he brought a force of 3,000 to take possession of Locri, and succeeded in storming one of Locri's two citadels by the aid of exceptionally tall ladders. This action led to a skirmish with Carthaginian troops, who occupied the other citadel. Hostilities escalated when Hannibal arrived on the scene, but Locrian insiders enabled Pleminius's men to hold out until Scipio could bring troops from Messana, at which time the Carthaginians withdrew. Scipio's intervention technically exceeded the mandate of his command and crossed into the provincia of his consular colleague Crassus.

Scipio immediately rounded up the Locrians who had attempted to secede and executed them. Those who had remained loyal and aided Rome received their reward in the form of their fellow citizens' property. Scipio then sent a delegation to Rome placing the matter of Locri's political status in the hands of the Roman Senate, and returned with his troops to Messana. Bruttium had been Hannibal's last stronghold in Italy, and Rome's position there was still tentative; from a diplomatic perspective, it was important to show that Rome was the preferable overlord.

== Violence and disorder ==
In Scipio's absence, the soldiers under Pleminius lapsed into looting, which the officers attempted to restrain. Discipline dissolved utterly, and the Roman forces divided into warring troops. The men attached to Pleminius got the worst of it, and reported to him with a display of wounds and complaints of ill treatment.

Pleminius's reaction to this breakdown of discipline was to have the tribunes arrested, stripped, and flogged. Their men then attacked Pleminius, mutilating his ears and nose. Learning of these disturbances, Scipio returned — and reinstated Pleminius. He ordered the offending tribunes sent to Rome to stand trial. "This judgment," notes H.H. Scullard, "is unexpected," and various explanations have been proffered. Scullard concludes that Scipio was "guilty of folly and of lack of humanity."

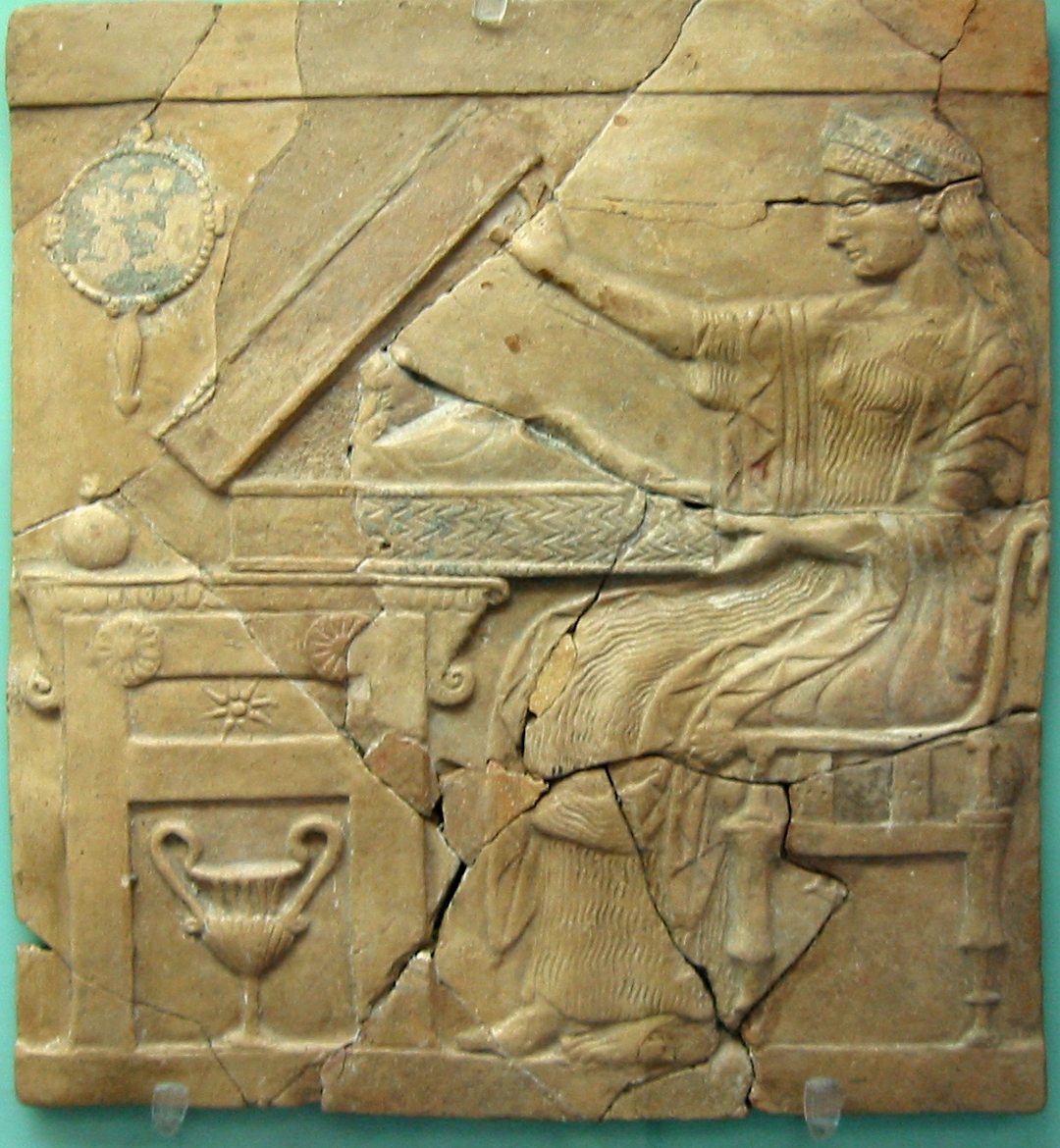
Pinax from Locri depicting Proserpina opening the liknon used in the mystery rites

As soon as Scipio left for Sicily, Pleminius had the tribunes seized and tortured them to death, offering a "novel" justification: "No one knew how to name the penalty for a crime except someone who had learnt its savagery by suffering." They were left unburied.

With a rage that seemed unquenchable, Pleminius turned his violence toward Locrians he suspected of informing Scipio. Meanwhile, the Locrian envoys who had traveled to Rome for the senate hearing related in detail how the excesses of the Roman soldiers surpassed those of the Carthaginians. They complained of widespread rapes committed against women and boys dragged from their homes, and the sacrilegious looting of the Temple of Proserpina, the chief deity of Locri. These reports provided fodder for Quintus Fabius Maximus Verrucosus, nearing the end of his life, in his opposition to Scipio and his "Greek" way of life in Sicily and his plans to invade Africa. The Locrians, however, diverted any blame to Pleminius.

== The legal case ==
The senate sent a ten-man commission headed by Marcus Pomponius Matho to investigate, along with two tribunes of the plebs and an aedile. Matho was the praetor and propraetor assigned to Sicily from 204 to 202 BC, and had been authorized to recall Scipio if necessary, but the commission had no judicial powers. Its size was virtually unprecedented, and reflects both the importance of the case and its ultimate target: Scipio, not merely Pleminius. The difficulty and delicacy of Matho's position should not be underestimated; the legal question was whether a high-level magistrate should be held responsible for actions committed by an officer to whom he had delegated imperium on his own authority. Since Matho's own imperium was inferior to that of Scipio, there was a risk that if charged and found guilty, the proconsul would ignore the praetor and simply exit the province to pursue his African venture. Scipio, however, dazzled the commission, while Pleminius was left to take the fall for plundering the Temple of Proserpina and murdering the tribunes Publius Matienus and Marcus Sergius. The legates were able to report that Pleminius had acted neither on Scipio's orders nor according to his wishes (neque iussu neque voluntate).

=== Questions of arrest and exile ===
Versions of Pleminius's arrest vary. Livy reports two. In one, Pleminius fled when he heard about the investigation, and attempted to go into exile at Naples. He was captured en route by the legate Quintus Caecilius Metellus, the consul of 206 BC. Alternatively, Livy says, Scipio himself sent his own legate and an elite squadron of cavalry to arrest Pleminius and turned him over to the commission.

Diodorus reports only the second version that ameliorates Scipio's conduct, but has Scipio summoning Pleminius to Sicily, throwing him in chains, then handing him over to the two plebeian tribunes sent with the commission, who were duly impressed by this firm response. Pleminius was later shipped off to Rome and imprisoned, but died before his trial concluded. The charge would have been perduellio, a capital crime, most likely to be brought before the centuriate assembly.

What was unusual, and perhaps unprecedented at the time, was the arrest of a man who held delegated imperium. If it's correct that Pleminius chose to become a fugitive, by Roman law he had deserted his post and would be considered an exile. The choice of exile to escape sentencing in a capital crime brought with it a loss of citizenship. The complexities of the case may account for the proliferating versions, and the potential legal status of Pleminius is of interest in documenting the use of exile in ancient Rome.

The case of sacrilege at Locri was a precedent in the investigation of an incident involving the same temple only a short time later, conducted by the praetor Quintus Minucius Rufus in 200 BC: see Minucius Rufus: Praetorship in Locri.

== Imprisonment, attempted escape, and execution ==
Livy reports that Pleminius, still imprisoned in 194 BC, organized a number of men to cover his escape by setting fire to various points in Rome. This was to take place during the Sacred Games. The plot was betrayed and reported to the Senate; Pleminius was put to death.

== See also ==
- Pleminia (gens)

== Selected bibliography ==
- Bagnall, Nigel. The Punic Wars: Rome, Carthage, and the Struggle for the Mediterranean. St. Martin's Press, 1990.
- Brennan, T. Corey. The Praetorship in the Roman Republic. Oxford University Press, 2000.
- Broughton, T.R.S. The Magistrates of the Roman Republic. American Philological Association, 1951, 1986 reprint, vol. 1, p. 304.
- Kelly, Gordon P. A History of Exile in the Roman Republic. Cambridge University Press, 2006.
- Scullard, H.H. Scipio Africanus in the Second Punic War. Cambridge University Press, 1930.
- Vishnia, Rachel Feig. State, Society, and Popular Leaders in Mid-Republican Rome, 241–167 B.C. Routledge, 1996.
