= Marcus Claudius Marcellus (consul 196 BC) =

Consul and censor in the Roman Republic

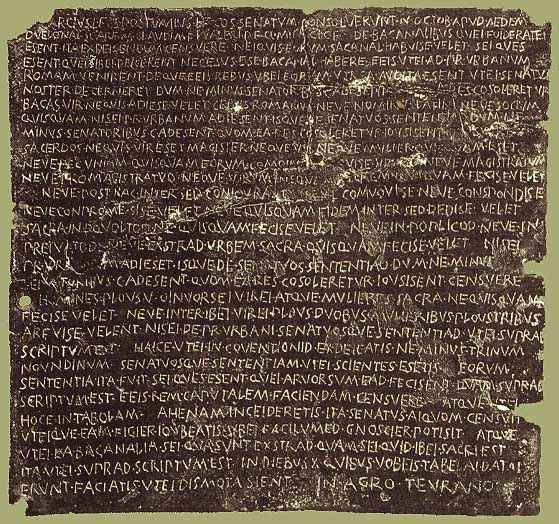
- Senatus consultum de Bacchanalibus CIL I, 581, dated October 7th 186 BC

Roman consul

Marcus Claudius Marcellus was a consul (196 BC) and a censor in (189 BC) of the Roman Republic. He was the son of the famous general Marcus Claudius Marcellus (killed 208 BC), and possibly father of the three-time consul Marcus Claudius Marcellus (consul 166 BC).

Marcellus first appears in Livy's history when his father, then curule aedile, brought an action before the Roman Senate against his colleague Scantinius Capitolinus who had made improper advances to the young and beautiful boy. The younger Marcellus, despite his evident embarrassment, convinced the senate of the man's guilt and his father was recompensed with some articles of silver which he dedicated to a temple. Marcellus would have been at least seven, and probably over 13 at the time of the incident (c. 226 BC). The relation of this case to the Lex Scantinia is vexed, since a Roman law was named after its proposer, and never a defendant.

Like his coevals, Marcellus fought in the Second Punic War, probably accompanying his father on various military campaigns, including the famous campaign against Syracuse. He was military tribune under his father, when the two consuls were ambushed in 208 BC resulting in his father's death and the other consul's severe injury. Marcellus himself was badly wounded; his father's body was subsequently returned by Hannibal to the son.

In 204 BC Marcellus was a tribune of the plebs, appointed to lead a commission (also including Cato) to investigate charges made against Scipio Africanus. The charges were dismissed, and it is unclear what relationship, if any, existed between the two men. (Marcellus's father and Scipio's uncle had been co-consuls in 222 BC).

In 186 BC Marcellus was one of three former consuls mentioned in the senatus consultum de Bacchanalibus, who formed the committee for drawing up the report.

Political offices
Preceded by Gaius Cornelius Cethegus and Quintus Minucius Rufus	Consul of the Roman Republic with Lucius Furius Purpureo; 196 BC	Succeeded by Lucius Valerius Flaccus and Marcus Porcius M.f. Cato
Preceded by P. Cornelius Scipio Africanus and Publius Aelius Paetus	Censor of the Roman Republic with Titus Quinctius Flamininus; 189 BC	Succeeded by Lucius Valerius Flaccus and Marcus Porcius Cato
