= Cenomani (Narbonensis) =

Ancient Gallic tribe

The Cenomani were a Gallic tribe that lived in the region of Massalia (modern Marseille) during the Iron Age.

== Name ==
They are mentioned as Cenomani by Cato (early 2nd c. BC), later cited by Pliny (1st c. AD).

The meaning of the Gaulish ethnonym Cenomani remains uncertain. The prefix probably stems from the root ceno-, which could have meant 'far, long'. The second element may derive from manos ('good'), or else from the root *menH- ('to go'), with Cenomani as 'the far-going one'. Patrizia de Bernardo Stempel has similarly glossed the ethnonym as 'the far-goers'. Pierre-Yves Lambert has also proposed a connection to a verbal stem *cene/o- (cf. OIr. cinid 'to spring from, to descend from', Welsh cenedl 'family'). The general meaning would be 'the begotten ones'.

Two homonym tribes, the Cenomani (Cisalpine Gaul) and the Aulerci Cenomani (modern Sarthe) are also attested.

== Geography ==
In the early 2nd century BC, Cato the Elder, as cited by Pliny, reports that the Cenomani lived among the Volcae, in the vicinity of Massalia.

Text (Loeb)	Translation (Loeb)	Reference
Venetos Troiana stirpe ortos auctor est Cato, Cenomanos iuxta Massiliam habitasse in Volcis.	Cato testifies that the Veneti are descended from Trojan stock and that the Cenomani lived near Massilia in the territory of the Volcae.	Origines F 58 (apud Pliny, 3, 130)

== History ==
Ancient sources associate the presence of Cenomani in Cisalpine Gaul with migrations toward northern Italy. The Aulerci Cenomani, located near modern Le Mans, are attested by Caesar in the mid-1st century BC.

With regard to the Cenomani of Massalia, Guy Barruol notes the Volcae are thought to have settled in Languedoc only from the early 3rd century BC, whereas Livy dates Cenomani migrations toward Italy to the 5th century BC, a chronology that is difficult to reconcile if the Cisalpine Cenomani were derived from this group. Barruol therefore concludes that the presence of similarly named peoples may simply reflect a common origin, although an identifiable original homeland remains unclear.

== Bibliography ==
- Barruol, Guy (1969). Les Peuples préromains du Sud-Est de la Gaule: étude de géographie historique. E. de Boccard. OCLC 3279201.
- Delamarre, Xavier (2003). Dictionnaire de la langue gauloise: Une approche linguistique du vieux-celtique continental. Errance. ISBN 9782877723695.
- Lafond, Yves; Sartori, Antonio (2006). "Cenomanni". Brill's New Pauly. doi:10.1163/1574-9347_bnp_e230080.
- Lambert, Pierre-Yves (2005). "The place names of Lugdunensis [Λουγδουνησία]". In de Hoz, Javier; Luján, Eugenio R.; Sims-Williams, Patrick (eds.). New approaches to Celtic place-names in Ptolemy's Geography. Ediciones Clásicas. pp. 215–251. ISBN 978-8478825721.
