= Senatus consultum de Bacchanalibus =

Old Latin inscription dating to 186 BC

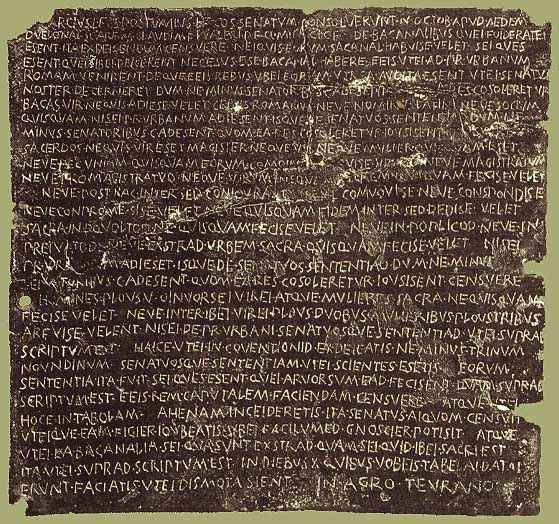
Reproduction based on a rubbing of the inscription, which is intaglio engraved on bronze. The original is in the Kunsthistorisches Museum, Vienna.

The senatus consultum de Bacchanalibus ("senatorial decree concerning the Bacchanalia") is an Old Latin inscription dating to 186 BC. It was discovered in 1640 at Tiriolo, in Calabria, southern Italy. Published by the presiding praetor, it conveys the substance of a decree of the Roman Senate prohibiting the Bacchanalia throughout all Roman Italy, except in certain special cases which must be approved specifically by the Senate.

When members of the elite began to participate, information was put before the Senate by Publius Aebutius and his lover and neighbour Hispala Faecenia, who was also a well-known prostitute, as told in the Ab Urbe Condita Libri of the Augustan historian Livy. The cult was held to be a threat to the security of the state, investigators were appointed, rewards were offered to informants, legal processes were put in place and the Senate began the official suppression of the cult throughout Italy. According to Livy, the chief historical source, many committed suicide to avoid indictment. The stated penalty for leadership was death. Livy stated that there were more executions than imprisonments. After the conspiracy had been quelled the Bacchanalia survived in southern Italy.

The Senatus consultum de Bacchanalibus can be seen as an example of realpolitik, a display of the Roman senate's authority to its Italian allies after the Second Punic War, and a reminder to any Roman politician, populist and would-be generalissimo that the Senate's collective authority trumped all personal ambition. Nevertheless, the extent and ferocity of the official response to the Bacchanalia was probably unprecedented, and betrays some form of moral panic on the part of Roman authorities; Burkert finds "nothing comparable in religious history before the persecutions of Christians".

== Text ==
The surviving copy is inscribed on a bronze tablet discovered in Calabria in Southern Italy (1640), now at the Kunsthistorisches Museum in Vienna. The text as copied from the inscription is as follows.

1. [Q] MARCIVS L F S POSTVMIVS L F COS SENATVM CONSOLVERVNT N OCTOB APVD AEDEM
2. DVELONAI SC ARF M CLAVDI M F L VALERI P F Q MINVCI C F DE BACANALIBVS QVEI FOIDERATEI
3. ESENT ITA EXDEICENDVM CENSVERE NEIQVIS EORVM BACANAL HABVISE VELET SEI QVES
4. ESENT QVEI SIBEI DEICERENT NECESVS ESE BACANAL HABERE EEIS VTEI AD PR VRBANVM
5. ROMAM VENIRENT DEQVE EEIS REBVS VBEI EORVM VER[B]A AVDITA ESENT VTEI SENATVS
6. NOSTER DECERNERET DVM NE MINVS SENATOR[I]BVS C ADESENT [QVOM E]A RES COSOLORETVR
7. BACAS VIR NEQVIS ADIESE VELET CEIVIS ROMANVS NEVE NOMINVS LATINI NEVE SOCIVM
8. QVISQVAM NISEI PR VRBANVM ADIESENT ISQVE [D]E SENATVOS SENTENTIAD DVM NE
9. MINVS SENATORIBVS C ADESENT QVOM EA RES COSOLERETVR IOVSISENT CE[N]SVERE
10. SACERDOS NEQVIS VIR ESET MAGISTER NEQVE VIR NEQVE MVLIER QVISQVAM ESET
11. NEVE PECVNIAM QVISQVAM EORVM COMOINE[M H]ABVISE VE[L]ET NEVE MAGISTRATVM
12. NEVE PRO MAGISTRATVD NEQVE VIRVM [NEQVE MVL]IEREM QVISQVAM FECISE VELET
13. NEVE POST HAC INTER SED CONIOVRA[SE NEV]E COMVOVISE NEVE CONSPONDISE
14. NEVE CONPROMESISE VELET NEVE QVISQVAM FIDEM INTER SED DEDISE VELET
15. SACRA IN OQVOLTOD NE QVISQVAM FECISE VELET NEVE IN POPLICOD NEVE IN
16. PREIVATOD NEVE EXSTRAD VRBEM SACRA QVISQVAM FECISE VELET NISEI
17. PR VRBANVM ADIESET ISQVE DE SENATVOS SENTENTIAD DVM NE MINVS
18. SENATORIBVS C ADESENT QVOM EA RES COSOLERETVR IOVSISENT CENSVERE
19. HOMINES PLOVS V OINVORSEI VIREI ATQVE MVLIERES SACRA NE QVISQVAM
20. FECISE VELET NEVE INTER IBEI VIREI PLOVS DVOBVS MVLIERIBVS PLOVS TRIBVS
21. ARFVISE VELENT NISEI DE PR VRBANI SENATVOSQVE SENTENTIAD VTEI SVPRAD
22. SCRIPTVM EST HAICE VTEI IN COVENTIONID EXDEICATIS NE MINVS TRINVM
23. NOVNDINVM SENATVOSQVE SENTENTIAM VTEI SCIENTES ESETIS EORVM
24. SENTENTIA ITA FVIT SEI QVES ESENT QVEI ARVORSVM EAD FECISENT QVAM SVPRAD
25. SCRIPTVM EST EEIS REM CAPVTALEM FACIENDAM CENSVERE ATQVE VTEI
26. HOCE IN TABOLAM AHENAM INCEIDERETIS ITA SENATVS AIQVOM CENSVIT
27. VTEIQVE EAM FIGIER IOVBEATIS VBI FACILVMED GNOSCIER POTISIT ATQVE
28. VTEI EA BACANALIA SEI QVA SVNT EXSTRAD QVAM SEI QVID IBEI SACRI EST
29. ITA VTEI SVPRAD SCRIPTVM EST IN DIEBVS X QVIBVS VOBEIS TABELAI DATAI
30. ERVNT FACIATIS VTEI DISMOTA SIENT IN AGRO TEVRANO

== Translation into classical Latin ==
The following passage uses classical reflexes of the Old Latin lexical items:

1. [Quīntus] Mārcius L(ūciī) f(īlius), S(purius) Postumius L(ūciī) f(īlius) cō(n)s(ulēs) senātum cōnsuluērunt N(ōnīs) Octōb(ribus), apud aedem
2. Bellōnae. Sc(rībendō) adf(uērunt) M(ārcus) Claudi(us) M(ārcī) f(īlius), L(ūcius) Valeri(us) P(ubliī) f(īlius), Q(uīntus) Minuci(us) C (=Gaiī) f(īlius). Dē Bacchānālibus quī foederātī
3. essent, ita ēdīcendum cēnsuēre: «Nēquis eōrum [B]acchānal habuisse vellet. Sī quī
4. essent, quī sibī dīcerent necesse esse Bacchānal habēre, eīs utī ad pr(aetōrem) urbānum
5. Rōmam venīrent, dēque eīs rēbus, ubī eōrum v[e]r[b]a audīta essent, utī senātus
6. noster dēcerneret, dum nē minus senatōr[i]bus C adessent, [cum e]a rēs cōnsulerētur.
7. Bacchās vir nēquis adiisse vellet cīvis Rōmānus nēve nōminis Latīnī nēve sociōrum
8. quisquam, nisi pr(aetōrem) urbānum adiissent, isque [d]ē senātūs sententiā, dum nē
9. minus senātōribus C adessent, cum ea rēs cōnsulerētur, iussissent. Cēnsuēre.
10. Sacerdōs nēquis vir esset; magister neque vir neque mulier quisquam esset.
11. Nēve pecūniam quisquam eōrum commūne[m h]abuisse vellet; nēve magistrātum,
12. nēve prō magistrātū, neque virum [neque mul]ierem qui[s]quam fecisse vellet,
13. nēve posthāc inter sē coniūrās[se nēv]e convōvisse nēve cōnspondisse
14. nēve comprōmīsisse vellet, nēve quisquam fidem inter sē dedisse vellet.
15. Sacra in occultō nē quisquam fēcisse vellet. Nēve in publicō nēve in
16. prīvātō nēve extrā urbem sacra quisquam fēcisse vellet, nisi
17. pr(aetōrem) urbānum adiisset, isque dē senātūs sententiā, dum nē minus
18. senatōribus C adessent, cum ea rēs cōnsulerētur, iussissent. Cēnsuēre.
19. Hominēs plūs V ūniversī virī atque mulierēs sacra nē quisquam
20. fēcisse vellet, nēve inter ibī virī plūs duōbus, mulieribus plūs tribus
21. adfuisse vellent, nisi dē pr(aetōris) urbānī senātūsque sententiā, utī suprā
22. scrīptum est.» Haec utī in cōntiōne ēdīcātis nē minus trīnum
23. nūndinum, senātūsque sententiam utī scientēs essētis, eōrum
24. sententia ita fuit: «Sī quī essent, quī adversum ea fēcissent, quam suprā
25. scrīptum est, eīs rem capitālem faciendam cēnsuēre». Atque utī
26. hoc in tabulam ahēnam incīderētis, ita senātus aequum cēnsuit,
27. utīque eam fīgī iubeātis, ubī facillimē nōscī possit; atque
28. utī ea Bacchānālia, sī quae sunt, extrā quam sī quid ibī sacrī est,
29. (ita utī suprā scrīptum est) in diēbus X, quibus vōbīs tabellae datae
30. erunt, faciātis utī dīmōta sint. In agrō Teurānō.

== Orthography ==
The spelling of the text of the Senatus consultum differs in many predictable ways from the spelling of Classical Latin. Some of these differences are merely orthographical; others reflect archaic pronunciations or other archaisms in the forms of words.

=== Geminate consonants ===
In Classical Latin, geminate (or long) consonants are consistently written with a sequence of two letters: e.g., cc, ll, ss for [kː], [lː], [sː]. These geminate consonants are not represented in the Senatus consultum:

C for cc in HOCE (26:1) hocce
C for cch in BACANALIBVS (2:17) Bacchānālibus, BACANAL (3:7, 4:7) Bacchānal, BACAS (7:1) Bacchās, BACANALIA (28:3) Bacchānālia. The h was probably not pronounced.
L for ll in DVELONAI (2:1) Bellōnae, VELET (3:9 et passim) vellet, VELENT (21:2) vellent, FACILVMED (27:6) facillimē, TABELAI (29:11) tabellae
M for mm in COMOINE[M] (11:5) commūnem
Q for cc in OQVOLTOD (15:3) occultō
S for ss in ADESENT (6:8, 9:4, 18:3) adessent, ADIESE (7:4) adiisse, ADIESENT (8:5) adiissent, ADIESET (17:3) adiisset, ARFVISE (21:1) adfuisse, COMVOVISE (13:8) convōvisse, CONPROMESISE (14:2) comprōmīsisse, CONSPONDISE (13:10) conspondisse, DEDISE (14:9) dedisse, ESE (4:6), ESENT (3:1, 4:1, 5:10, 24:6) essent, ESET (10:4, 10:11), ESETIS (23:6) essētis, FECISE (12:9, 15:6, 16:7, 20:1) fēcisse, FECISENT (24:10) fēcissent, HABVISE (3:8) habuisse, IOVSISENT (9:9) iussissent, NECESVS (4:5) necessus.

=== Consonant clusters ===
Archaic gn- is found for n- at the beginning of the verb nosco

GNOSCIER (27:7) noscī.

The prefix ad appears as AR before V and F:

ARVORSVM adversum (24:8), ARFVISE (21:1) adfuisse, and ARF[VERVNT] (2:3) adfuērunt.

The consonants bl appear as PL in POPLICOD publicō (15:10), recalling its origin from populus.

=== Diphthongs ===
AI is usually used instead of Classical ae in:

DVELONAI (2:1) Bellōnae, HAICE (22:3) haec, AIQVOM (26:8) aequum and TABELAI DATAI (29:11–12) tabellae datae. But AE is found in AEDEM (1:15).

EI became Classical ī in:

QVEI (2:18, 4:2, 24:7) quī, SEI (3:10, 24:4, 28:4,9) sī, VIREI (19:5, 20:6) virī, CEIVIS (7:6) cīvis, DEICERENT (4:4) dīcerent, EXDEICATIS (22:7) ēdīcātis, EXDEICENDVM (3:3) ēdīcendum, INCEIDERETIS (26:5) incīderētis, PREIVATOD prīvātō (16:1), EEIS (4:9, 5:4, 25:3) eīs, VOBEIS (29:10) vōbīs, FOIDERATEI (2:19) foederātī, OINVORSEI (19:4) ūniversī

EI at the end of a word often corresponds to Classical short i or to no vowel at all. However, in many cases such as sibī, utī, archaizing Classical forms ending in ī are also found, especially in poetry.

IBEI (20:5, 28:11) ibi, NISEI (8:2, 16:9, 21:3) nisi, SIBEI (4:3) sibi, VBEI ubi (5:6), VTEI ut (4:10 et passim), VTEIQVE (27:1) utque.

OV normally became Classical ū in:

CONIOVRA[SE] (13:6) coniūrāsse, NOVNDINVM (23:1) nūndinum, PLOVS (19:2, 20:7,10) plūs. Classical iubeātis and iussissent for IOVBEATIS (27:4) and IOVSISENT (9:9, 18:8) show the influence of the participle iussus, with regular short u in the stem.

OI normally became Classical ū in:

COMOINE[M] (11:5) commūnem, OINVORSEI (19:4) ūniversī

OI exceptionally became Classical oe in:

FOIDERATEI (2:19) foederātī

=== Short vowels ===
VO occurs instead of Classical Latin ve in ARVORSVM (24:8) adversum and OINVORSEI (19:4) ūniversī.
OL occurs instead of Classical Latin ul in COSOLERETVR (6:12) cōnsulerētur, CONSOLVERVNT (1:11) cōnsuluērunt, TABOLAM (26:3) tabulam and OQVOLTOD (15:3) occultō.
OM occurs instead of Classical Latin um in QVOM (18:4) cum and AIQVOM (26:8) aequum.
O occurs instead of Classical Latin u in POPLICOD publicō
V occurs instead of Classical Latin i in FACILVMED (27:6) facillimē and CAPVTALEM capitālem. The spelling of CAPVTALEM recalls its origin from the noun caput. The ending -umus for -imus occurs frequently in archaic Classical Latin texts; the vowel represented interchangeably by u and i may have been a central vowel distinct in sound from both. Possibly OINVORSEI (19:4) ūniversī belongs here too, if one may read it as oinu(v)orsei.

=== Archaisms ===
The archaic ending -ce added to some forms of the pronoun hic is reduced to -c in Classical Latin in most cases:

HAICE (22:3) haec and HOCE (26:1) hoc

The ending -d, found on some adverbs and ablative singulars of nouns and pronouns, is lost in Classical Latin:

Adverbs SVPRAD (21:10, 24:12, 29:3) suprā, EXSTRAD (16:3, 28:7) extrā, FACILVMED (27:6) facillimē.
Ablatives EAD (24:9) eā, SED (13:5, 14:8) sē, COVENTIONID (22:6) cōntiōne, MAGISTRATVD magistrātū (12:3), OQVOLTOD (15:3) occultō, POPLICOD publicō (15:10), PREIVATOD prīvātō (16:1), SENTENTIAD (8:9, 17:7, 21:8) sententiā.

The last two words AGRO TEVRANO (30:7–8) omit the final -d, despite containing the same ablative ending elsewhere written -OD; this fact suggests that at the time of writing, the final -d was no longer pronounced in ordinary speech.

In Classical Latin the prefixes ex- and dis- become ē- and dī- before voiced consonants. In the Senatus consultum, they are still written EX and DIS:

EXDEICENDVM (3:3) ēdīcendum, EXDEICATIS ēdīcātis (22:7), and DISMOTA (30:4) dīmōta.

=== Archaic morpheme variants ===
The archaic passive infinitive ending -ier (instead of Classical -ī) is used

FIGIER (27:3) fīgī, GNOSCIER (27:7) noscī.

The archaic third-declension genitive singular ending -us (instead of Classical -is) is used in NOMINVS (7.9) (instead of nōminis). The ending -us comes from the Indo-European genitive singular ending *-os, the o-grade variant of the genitive singular suffix for consonant-stem nouns (while Classical -is comes from the e-grade variant *-es of the same suffix).

== Translation into English ==
The inscription was translated by Nina E. Weston as follows.

"The Consuls Quintus Marcius, the son of Lucius, and Spurius Postumius, the son of Lucius, consulted the senate on the Nones of October (7th), at the temple of the Bellona. Marcus Claudius, son of Marcus, Lucius Valerius, son of Publius, and Quintus Minucius, son of Gaius, were the committee for drawing up the report.
Regarding the Bacchanalia, it was resolved to give the following directions to those who are in alliance with us:
No one of them is to possess a place where the festivals of Bacchus are celebrated; if there are any who claim that it is necessary for them to have such a place, they are to come to Rome to the praetor urbanus, and the senate is to decide on those matters, when their claims have been heard, provided that not less than 100 senators are present when the affair is discussed. No man is to be a Bacchantian, neither a Roman citizen, nor one of the Latin name, nor any of our allies unless they come to the praetor urbanus, and he in accordance with the opinion of the senate expressed when not less than 100 senators are present at the discussion, shall have given leave. Carried.
No man is to be a priest; no one, either man or woman, is to be an officer (to manage the temporal affairs of the organization); nor is anyone of them to have charge of a common treasury; no one shall appoint either man or woman to be master or to act as master; henceforth they shall not form conspiracies among themselves, stir up any disorder, make mutual promises or agreements, or interchange pledges; no one shall observe the sacred rites either in public or private or outside the city, unless he comes to the praetor urbanus, and he, in accordance with the opinion of the senate, expressed when no less than 100 senators are present at the discussion, shall have given leave. Carried.
No one in a company of more than five persons altogether, men and women, shall observe the sacred rites, nor in that company shall there be present more than two men or three women, unless in accordance with the opinion of the praetor urbanus and the senate as written above.
See that you declare it in the assembly (contio) for not less than three market days; that you may know the opinion of the senate this was their judgment: if there are any who have acted contrary to what was written above, they have decided that a proceeding for a capital offense should be instituted against them; the senate has justly decreed that you should inscribe this on a brazen tablet, and that you should order it to be placed where it can be easiest read; see to it that the revelries of Bacchus, if there be any, except in case there be concerned in the matter something sacred, as was written above, be disbanded within ten days after this letter shall be delivered to you.
In the Teuranian field."

== See also ==
- List of Roman laws
- Roman Senate
