= Titus Quinctius Flamininus =

Roman general and statesman (c. 230–174 BC)

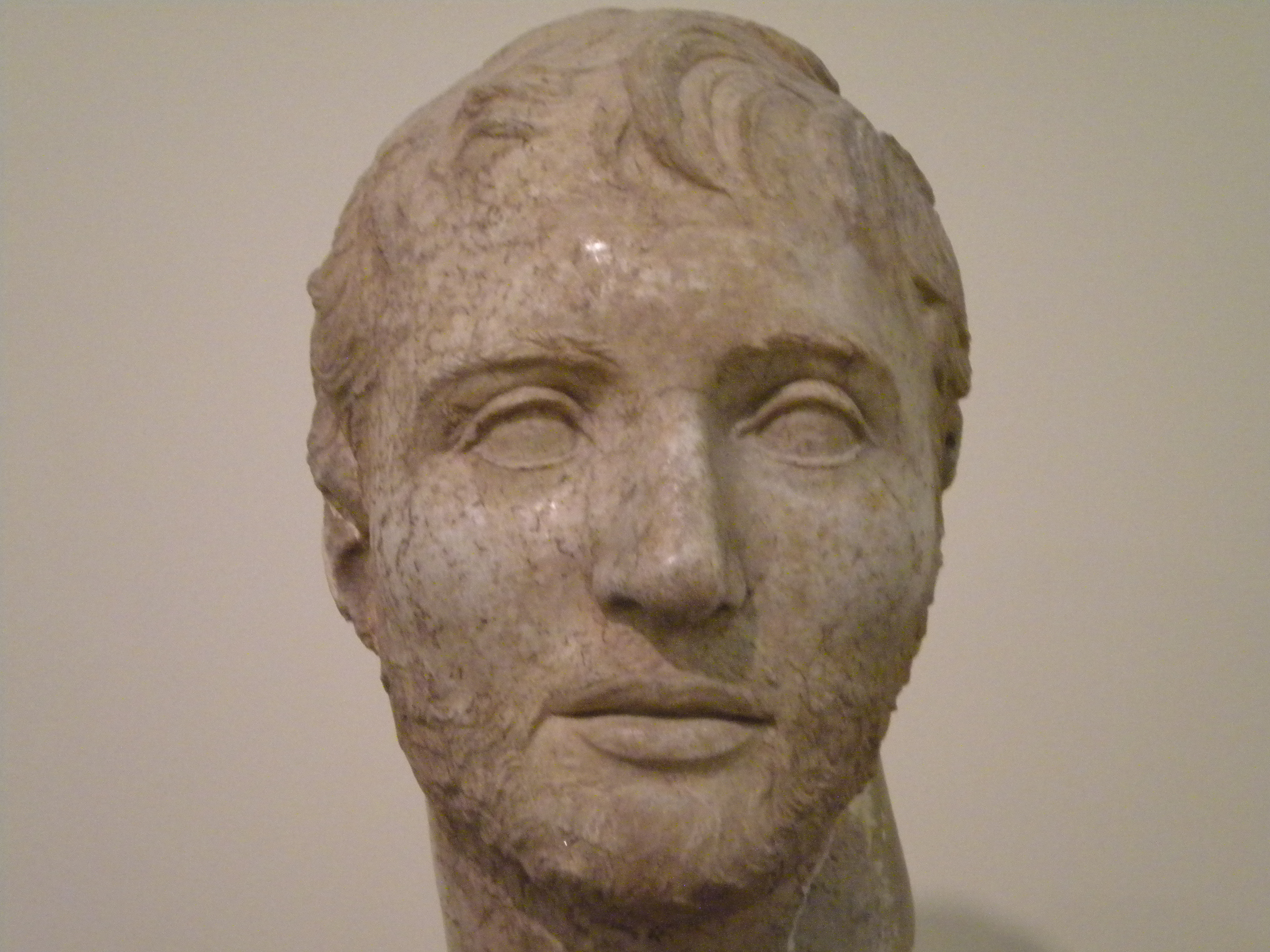
- Bust believed to be Titus Flamininus, the victor at Cynoscephalae
- Born: c. 229 BC
- Died: 174 BC (aged approx 55)
- Office: Consul (198 BC); Censor (189 BC)

Military service
- Battles/wars: Battle of Cynoscephalae (197 BC)
- Awards: Triumph (194 BC)

Titus Quinctius Flamininus (c. 229–174 BC) was a Roman politician and general instrumental in the Roman conquest of Greece.

== Family background ==
Flamininus belonged to the minor patrician gens Quinctia. The family had a glorious place in the early history of Rome, especially the famous hero Lucius Quinctius Cincinnatus, but it had somewhat lost its political influence by the middle of the fourth century BC. Flamininus' great grandfather Caeso Quinctius Claudus was still consul in 271, the last time a Quinctius is recorded as holding a curule office before 209.

Lucius Quinctius, his grandfather, was flamen Dialis — the great priest of Jupiter — during the third quarter of the third century. The cognomen Flamininus borne by his descendants derives from this prestigious priesthood. Flamininus' great grandson later put an apex, the head covering of the Flamen, as a symbol of his family on a denarius he minted. Flamininus' father — also named Titus — is not known. He had two sons: the elder, Titus Flamininus, was born c.228, the younger Lucius followed soon after. At the end of the third century, the Quinctii regained a good status among the political class, as shown by Flamininus' uncle Caeso who built the Temple of Concord in 217, his younger brother who became augur in 213 at a very young age, and his distant cousin Titus Quinctius Crispinus, consul in 208.

The Quinctii were for a long time allied to the Fabii, one of the most prominent gentes of the Republic. They likely owed them the rare praenomen Caeso — a feature of the early Fabii — through marriages. Likewise, Flamininus was probably married to a Fabia, as Polybius says that Quintus Fabius Buteo, who later served under him in Greece, was his wife's nephew. The Buteones were very influential at the time thanks to Marcus Fabius Buteo, the Princeps Senatus between 216 and 210; he was also succeeded by another Fabius, the famous Cunctator.

== Early career ==
=== Military Tribune (208 BC) ===
Flamininus' early career was peculiar, as he skipped several steps of the cursus honorum. The Second Punic War that was raging in Italy created several unusual careers, that of Scipio Africanus being the most famous example. Flamininus' career started in 208 as military tribune, a junior military position. He served under the five-time consul Marcus Claudius Marcellus, who commanded the operations against Hannibal in Southern Italy. Marcellus died in a Carthaginian ambush near Crotone in 208.

=== Propraetor of Tarentum (205–202 BC) ===
Flamininus then became quaestor, probably in 206, although some historians have suggested a later date. He was sent to Tarentum to second his uncle Quinctius Claudus Flamininus, who was the propraetor in charge of the Roman garrison. Rome kept a strong military presence into this Greek city because it had previously defected to Hannibal.

His uncle likely died in Tarentum in 205, and it seems that Flamininus was given his command since he was already on-site. Becoming propraetor before 25 was an extraordinary achievement, but it can be explained by the fact that experienced commanders were used abroad at the end of the Second Punic War. Livy tells that he was prorogued in 204, but remains silent on the following years; he might have stayed there until the end of the war in 202. In any case, Flamininus had a good relationship with the Greek population of Tarentum. During his time there, he also became familiar with the Greek language and culture.

=== Commissions (201-200 BC) ===
Flamininus is mentioned again in 201 as the last member of a ten-men commission tasked with settling veterans of Scipio Africanus in Southern Italy (Samnium and Apulia), perhaps because he knew the area after his command at Tarentum. This commission continued its work in 200, but Flamininus was nevertheless appointed to another commission of three men to enrol settlers in Venusia. It is the only occurrence in Roman history of a man being member of two commissions simultaneously.

== Consulship and command in Greece (198–194 BC) ==
=== Consular elections (199 BC) ===
In 199, Flamininus ran for the consulship, while he was not even 30 years old. The cursus honorum had not yet been formally organised in these years, but his bid for election still broke the tradition. He was even younger than Scipio Africanus, elected consul in 205 at 31, who had for him impressive military records and prestigious family support. In contrast, Flamininus came from a smaller family and could not boast any notable achievement during the war against Hannibal. At least two tribunes of the plebs, Marcus Fulvius and Manius Curius, vetoed his candidacy, precisely on the ground that he was too young and had not held any curule office (praetor or curule aedile). However, the Senate compelled them to remove their veto and allow Flamininus to present himself in the elections.

This anomaly led modern historians to suppose that Flamininus was backed by several powerful politicians. Early prosopographers such as Friedrich Münzer and H. H. Scullard thought that he was allied with the political faction led by the Fabii. However, this view has been contested, as the Fabii were in decline after the death of Buteo and the Cunctator.

Flamininus was elected consul, together with the plebeian Sextus Aelius Paetus Catus, as the consul posterior, which means the Centuriate Assembly elected him in second place, after Aelius. Plutarch tells that he owed his success to his land distributions in the commissions that made him popular among the settlers, who voted for him in return. The other consul likewise lacked any notable military achievement, and was elected thanks to his aedileship the previous year, during which he imported a lot of grain from Africa.

As the two consuls could not agree on the allocation of the provinces between them, they turned to sortition. At the time, the main prize was the conduct of the Second Macedonian War against Philip V of Macedon. Although several scholars have thought that the lottery was rigged in favour of Flamininus, it appears that he was just lucky; the known instances of rigged sortitions took place much later.

=== Campaign of 198 BC ===
After his election to the consulship he was chosen to replace Publius Sulpicius Galba who was consul with Gaius Aurelius in 200 BC, according to Livy, as general during the Second Macedonian War. He chased Philip V of Macedon out of most of Southern Greece, except for a few fortresses, defeating him at the Battle of the Aous, but as his term as consul was coming to an end he attempted to establish a peace with the Macedonian king. During the negotiations, Flamininus was made proconsul, giving him the authority to continue the war rather than finishing the negotiations. In 197 BC he defeated Philip at the Battle of Cynoscephalae in Thessaly, the Roman legions making the Macedonian phalanx obsolete in the process. Philip was forced to surrender, give up all the Greek cities he had conquered, and pay Rome 1,000 talents, but his kingdom was left intact to serve as a buffer state between Greece and Illyria. This displeased the Achaean League, Rome's allies in Greece, who wanted Macedon to be dismantled completely.

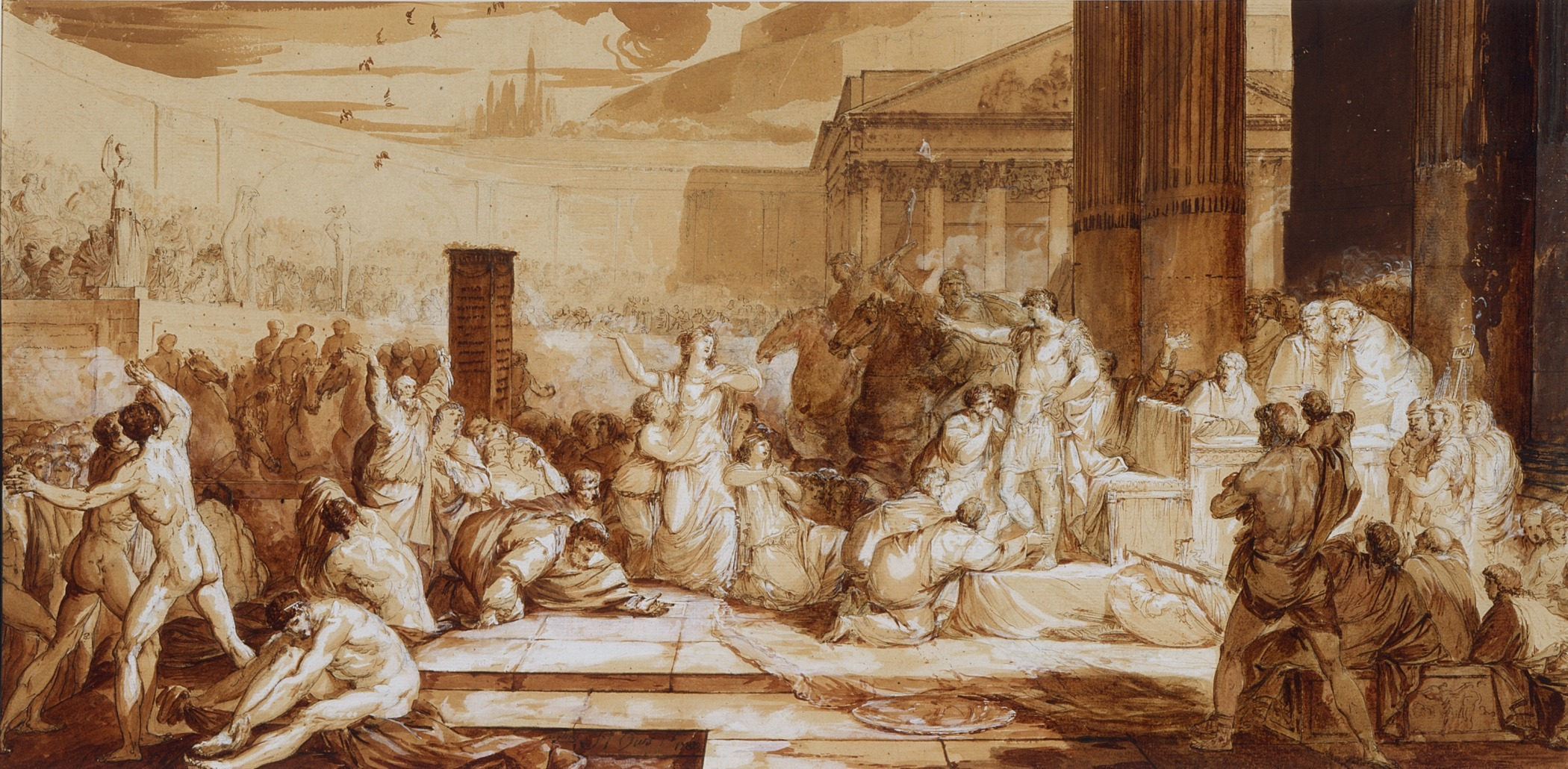
Flamininus Granting Liberty to Greece at the Isthmian Games (1780) by Jean-Pierre Saint-Ours

In 198 BC he occupied Anticyra in Phocis and made it his naval yard and his main provisioning port. During the period from 197 to 194 BC, from his seat in Elateia, Flamininus directed the political affairs of the Greek states. In 196 BC Flamininus appeared at the Isthmian Games in Corinth and proclaimed the freedom of the Greek states. He was fluent in Greek and was a great admirer of Greek culture, and the Greeks hailed him as their liberator; they minted coins with his portrait, and in some cities he was deified. According to Livy, this was the act of an unselfish Philhellene.

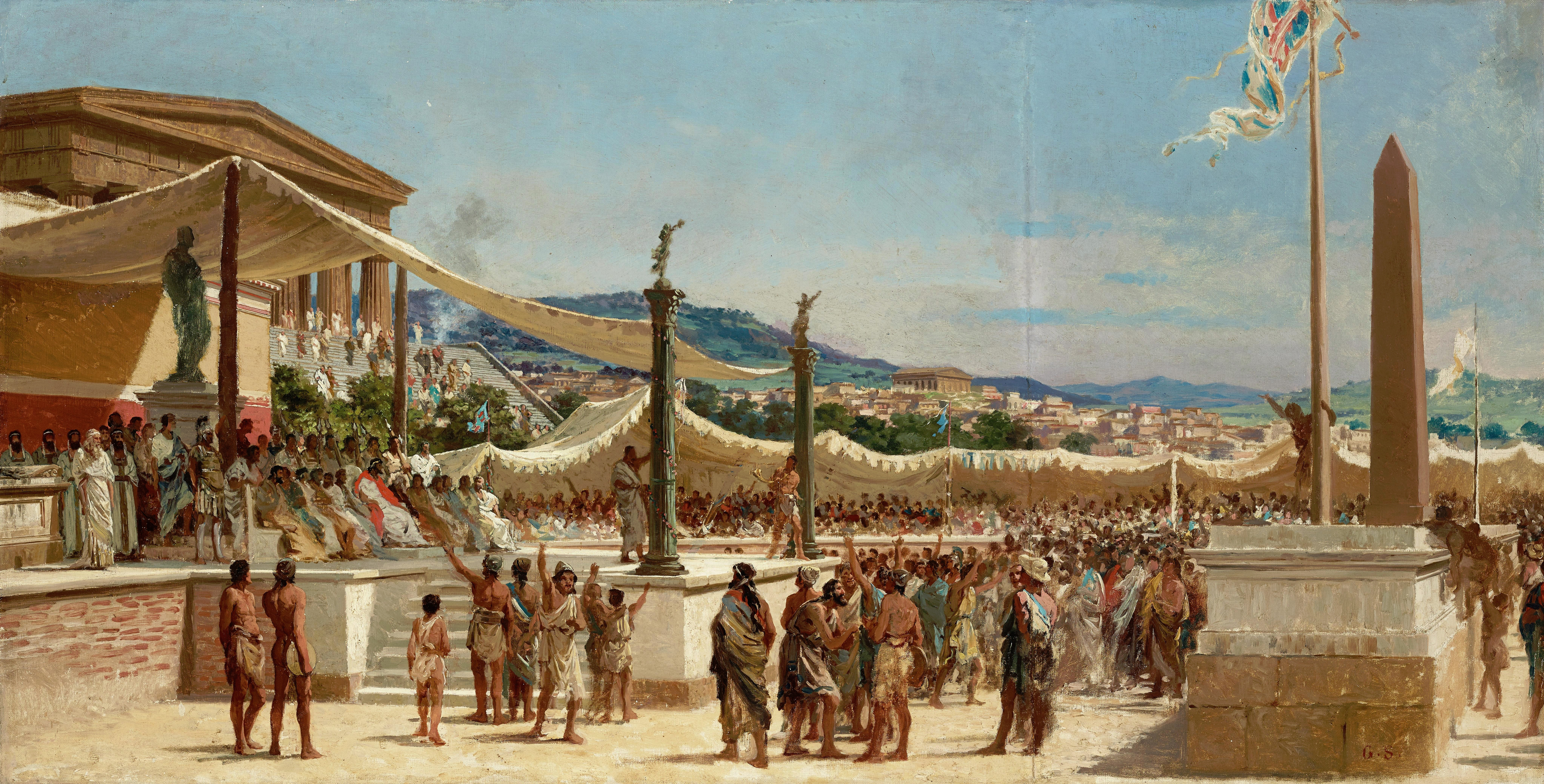
Titus Quinctius Flamininus Offers Liberty to the Greeks (ca. 1879) by Giuseppe Sciuti

With his Greek allies, Flamininus plundered Sparta, before returning to Rome in triumph along with thousands of freed slaves, 1,200 of whom were freed from Achaea, having been taken captive in Italy and sold in Greece during the Second Punic War.

Meanwhile, Eumenes II of Pergamum appealed to Rome for help against the Seleucid king Antiochus III. Flamininus was sent to negotiate with him in 192 BC, and warned him not to interfere with the Greek states. Antiochus did not believe Flamininus had the authority to speak for the Greeks, and promised to leave Greece alone only if the Romans did the same. These negotiations came to nothing and Rome was soon at war with Antiochus. Flamininus was present at the Battle of Thermopylae in 191 BC, in which Antiochus was defeated.

In 189 BC he was elected censor along with Marcus Claudius Marcellus, defeating among others Cato the Elder.

In 183 BC he was sent to negotiate with Prusias I of Bithynia in an attempt to capture Hannibal, who had been exiled there from Carthage, but Hannibal committed suicide to avoid being taken prisoner. According to Plutarch, many senators reproached Flamininus for having cruelly caused the death of an enemy who had now become harmless. Although nothing is known of him after this, Flamininus seems to have died around 174.

== Bibliography ==
=== Ancient sources ===
- Livy, Ab Urbe Condita (English translation by Rev. Canon Roberts on Wikisource).
- Plutarch, Parallel lives.
- Polybius, The Histories (English translation by William Roger Paton on LacusCurtius).

=== Modern sources ===
- Ernst Badian, "The Family and Early Career of T. Quinctius Flamininus", The Journal of Roman Studies, Vol. 61 (1971), pp. 102–111.
- T. Robert S. Broughton, The Magistrates of the Roman Republic, American Philological Association, 1951–1952.
- Michael Crawford, Roman Republican Coinage, Cambridge University Press (1974, 2001).
- Friedrich Münzer, Roman Aristocratic Parties and Families, translated by Thérèse Ridley, Johns Hopkins University Press, 1999 (originally published in 1920).
- Rene Pfeilschifter, Titus Quinctius Flamininus, Untersuchungen zur römischen Griechenlandpolitik, Göttingen, Vandenhoeck & Ruprecht, 2005.
- Jörg Rüpke, Anne Glock, David Richardson (translator), Fasti Sacerdotum: A Prosopography of Pagan, Jewish, and Christian Religious Officials in the City of Rome, 300 BC to AD 499, Oxford University Press, 2008.
- Francis X. Ryan, Rank and Participation in the Republican Senate, Stuttgart, Franz Steiner Verlag, 1998.

Political offices
Preceded by Lucius Cornelius Lentulus; Publius Villius Tappulus	Roman consul with Sextus Aelius Paetus Catus; 198 BC	Succeeded by Gaius Cornelius Cethegus; Quintus Minucius Rufus
Preceded by Sextus Aelius Paetus Catus; Gaius Cornelius Cethegus	Roman censor with Marcus Claudius Marcellus; 189 BC	Succeeded by Lucius Valerius Flaccus; Cato the Censor
