= Lucius Valerius Flaccus (consul 195 BC) =

Roman general and statesman

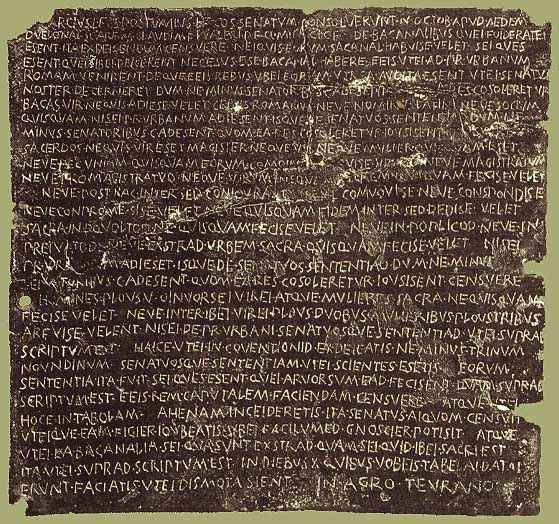
- Senatus consultum de Bacchanalibus CIL I, 581, dated October 7th 186 BC

Roman consul

Lucius Valerius Flaccus (died 180 BC) was a Roman politician and general. He was consul in 195 BC and censor in 183 BC, serving both times with his friend Cato the Elder, whom he brought to the notice of the Roman political elite.

== Family ==
Flaccus was a patrician and son of the Publius Valerius Flaccus who was consul in 227 BC with Marcus Atilius Regulus. His brother, Gaius Valerius Flaccus, was the flamen dialis, Gaius had a respectable political career, climbing the Cursus Honorum all the way to praetor, though not consul.

== Career ==
The patrician Flaccus became a friend, political patron, and ally of the young plebeian senator Marcus Porcius Cato, later called Cato the Elder, during the earlier years of the Second Punic War. Flaccus is possibly the Valerius Flaccus who was a military tribune in 212 BC, serving under the consuls who captured Hanno's camp at Beneventum.

Flaccus was curule aedile in 201 BC. He was probably the L. Valerius Flaccus who was a legate under the praetor Lucius Furius Purpureo in Gaul in 200. As praetor in 199, he was assigned to the province of Sicily. Flaccus received Italy as his province when he was consul in 195 BC, and continued to wage war as proconsul the following year against the Gauls, with a victory over the Insubres at Mediolanum. In 191 Flaccus was a legate under Manius Acilius Glabrio in the war against the Aetolians and at the Battle of Thermopylae.

In 190, Flaccus served on the three-man commission (triumviri coloniis deducendis) created to strengthen Placentia and Cremona. His fellow commissioners were M. Atilius Serranus (praetor 174 BC) and L. Valerius Tappo (praetor 192 BC). The following year, the commission founded Bononia (modern Bologna) as a Roman colony (colonia).

In a "hotly contested" election, Flaccus became censor along with Cato in 184. Their censorship was noted for its severity: Lucius Quinctius Flamininus, the consul of 192, was kicked out of the Roman Senate; Scipio Asiaticus, the consul of 190, lost his equestrian rank; and public contracts were leased stringently. The two men shared common conservative political sympathies and cultural outlook, and were loyal to the military and political views of the older generation represented by Quintus Fabius Maximus Verrucosus. Both he and Cato sought to defend Roman tradition against Hellenism. He initiated construction of the Via Flacca, named after him.

Flaccus was a member of the College of Pontiffs from 196, when he succeeded Marcus Cornelius Cethegus, until his death. In 186 BC he was one of three former consuls mentioned in the senatus consultum de Bacchanalibus, who formed the committee for drawing up the report.

Flaccus became princeps senatus when Scipio Africanus died in 183. He himself died three years later.

Political offices
Preceded by L. Furius Purpureo; M. Claudius Marcellus	Roman consul 195 BC; With: M. Porcius Cato	Succeeded by Scipio Africanus; Tib. Sempronius Longus
Preceded by Titus Quinctius Flamininus; Marcus Claudius Marcellus	Roman censor 184–183 BC; With: M. Porcius Cato	Succeeded by Marcus Aemilius Lepidus; Marcus Fulvius Nobilior
