= Cenomani (Cisalpine Gaul) =

Gallic people of Cisalpine Gaul

The Cenomani (Gaulish: Cenomani; Ancient Greek: Γονομάνοι) were a Gallic people of the eastern part of Cisalpine Gaul, settled around Brixia (modern Brescia) and Verona from the La Tène period. They entered northern Italy during the Celtic migrations of the 4th century BC, in legend in the train of Bellovesus. Long at odds with their western neighbors the Insubres, the Cenomani were generally favorable to Rome and are recorded as the only Gallic people to remain loyal at the outbreak of the Second Punic War. They passed under Roman control at the beginning of the 2nd century BC, and the colony of Cremona was founded on their territory.

== Name ==
=== Attestations ===
The people are recorded in Greek as Gonománoi (Γονομάνοι) by Polybius (2nd century BC), as Genománoi (Γενομάνοι) by Strabo (early 1st century AD), and as Kenomanoí (Κενομανοί) by Ptolemy (2nd century AD), and in Latin as Cenomani by Livy (late 1st century BC), (Note: The manuscripts of Livy read Germani in this passage. Editors emend the reading to Cenomani after Polybius.) with the ager Cenomanorum noted by Pliny (1st century AD).

=== Etymology ===
The meaning of the Gaulish ethnonym Cenomani remains uncertain. The prefix probably stems from the root ceno-, which could have meant 'far, long'. The second element may derive from manos ('good'), or else from the root *menH- ('to go'), with Cenomani as 'the far-going one'. Patrizia de Bernardo Stempel has similarly glossed the ethnonym as 'the far-goers'. Pierre-Yves Lambert has also proposed a connection to a verbal stem *cene/o- (cf. OIr. cinid 'to spring from, to descend from', Welsh cenedl 'family'). The general meaning would be 'the begotten ones'.

Two homonym tribes, the Aulerci Cenomani of Gallia Celtica and the Cenomani around Massalia, are also attested.

== Geography ==
The peoples of Cisalpine Gaul, 391–192 BC

The Cenomani held the plain east of the Insubres, in what is now eastern Lombardy and the western Veneto. Their territory ran roughly from the Po in the south to the first Alpine foothills around Lake Garda in the north, bounded on the west by the Oglio, which separated them from the Insubres, and reaching east to the Tartaro, or perhaps the Adige, on the side of the Veneti. In the geography of Polybius they are the easternmost of the Gaulish peoples settled north of the Po, beyond the Insubres.

Their principal center was Brixia (Brescia), which served as the caput gentis of the people, a role matched among the Insubres by Mediolanum. Verona lay within their territory, and in the Veronese the district between Povegliano and Vigasio appears as a center of theirs between the late 3rd and the 1st century BC. The Latin colony of Cremona was founded on Cenoman land. Bergomum (Bergamo) is sometimes assigned to the Cenomani, although Cato gave both Comum and Bergomum to the Orobii.

== History ==
=== Origins ===
The Cenomani were one of the Celtic peoples who settled Cisalpine Gaul during the migrations of the late 5th and 4th centuries BC, when groups from beyond the Alps moved into the Po Valley over an earlier Ligurian substrate. (Note: The chronology of these migrations is disputed. Livy places them under Tarquinius Priscus, in the late 7th or early 6th century BC, while the other ancient sources and most modern scholarship favor a shorter chronology in the late 5th and 4th centuries BC.) In the foundation legend reported by Livy, the Cenomani came from Gaul in the migration led by Bellovesus, under a leader named Etitovius, and occupied the country where Brixia and Verona later stood. They were followed by the coming of Libui, Salyes, Boii, and Lingones in the Po Valley, driving both the Etruscans and Umbrians away from their lands. J. H. C. Williams reads this migration narrative, shared by Livy and Pompeius Trogus, as a deliberate foundation myth that ties the Gaulish settlement to a synchronism with the respectable founding of Massalia, which the migrants were said to have assisted, and recasts the invasion as an orderly colonial movement. For Williams its purpose was to give the Cenomani and the Insubres, peoples still classed as Galli at Rome, a less barbarous past at a time when their claim to Roman citizenship was contested. Cato gave a different account, recording that the Cenomani had lived near Massalia, among the Volcae. The case for a western, Gaulish origin rests only on the shared name with a branch of the Aulerci in western Gaul.

Archaeologically the arrival of the Cenomani is marked by inhumation burials furnished with La Tène material. The impact on the existing Etruscan centers was sharp but did not bring down the whole system.

=== Wars with Rome ===
The Cenomani, like the neighboring Veneti, followed a policy favorable to Rome, and down to the Roman victory at the beginning of the 2nd century BC they were constant adversaries of the Insubres and their Boian allies. In the aftermath of the Gallic defeat at the battle of Telamon in 225 BC, Rome won the Cenomani as allies, a bond that took the form of a formal amicitia. In 223 BC Rome drew reinforcements from the Cenomani for the campaign against the Insubres and could count on their hold over the northern bank of the Po. According to Polybius, however, the Romans in the same year still guarded against the unreliability of their Gallic allies and declined to let the Cenomani fight beside them in an important battle against the Insubres. At the outbreak of the Second Punic War the Cenomani were the only Gallic people to remain loyal to Rome.

The alliance did not hold. By 200 BC the Cenomani had gone over to the anti-Roman side, joining the Boii and the Insubres in the assault on the colony of Placentia. In 197 BC, during the campaign of the consul Gaius Cornelius Cethegus, Roman envoys passed through the villages of the Cenomani and their capital Brixia, the caput gentis, and secured at least their neutrality. In the battle that followed the Insubres were routed, attacked, according to one report, from behind by the Cenomani themselves. The Roman victory ended the long rivalry, and the standing of the Cenomani was afterward strengthened under Roman hegemony.

=== Under Roman rule ===
After the conquest of 197 BC there were no further Gaulish wars or revolts in the plain. In 187 BC the Cenomani were ordered to give up their arms, but on an appeal to the Senate the order was reversed and their weapons restored. They afterward served Rome as auxiliaries, down to the campaigns against the Cimbri and Teutones that ended at the battle of Vercellae in 101 BC.

The treaty that bound the Cenomani and the Insubres to Rome, concluded after the wars of the 190s, barred any of their members from acquiring Roman citizenship, a stipulation preserved by Cicero. Emilio Gabba has argued that this exclusion served to stabilise the existing social order and so helped the two peoples persist as distinct communities into the late Republic. The lex Pompeia of 89 BC is generally taken to have lifted the restriction, granting the communities north of the Po Latin rights and the prospect of Roman citizenship through the holding of a magistracy in the newly created Latin colonies. For Williams, the Roman legal categories themselves did much to harden Cenomani into a settled ethnic label, with Brixia recognised as the center of the people much as Mediolanum was for the Insubres.

The name did not outlast the Augustan reorganisation. The country north of the Po was reclassed as Transpadana, and all reference to the Galli was dropped from the map of Italy even as the names of the Ligures and the Veneti were kept for two of the new regions. In the countryside, weapon burials and traditional funerary rites continued into the 1st century BC, at the very time when Brixia was acquiring its first Italian-style public buildings, including a Capitolium in the early 1st century BC. Williams reads this contrast as a sign of the slow and uneven spread of Roman ways from the towns into the countryside, and perhaps of a measure of passive resistance.

== Settlement and material culture ==
The earliest La Tène evidence on Cenoman territory comes from the cemetery of Carzaghetto, in use from the very beginning of the 3rd century BC, together with Gottolengo and Castiglione delle Stiviere, which date to the late 4th and early 3rd century BC. The Cenoman cemeteries of the 4th and 3rd centuries lie at the edge of the urbanized belt. At a time when the Boian burials were strongly marked by Etruscan and Italic culture, the Cenoman material remains thoroughly La Tène and keeps close to Transalpine standards, with no clear local imprint. At Carzaghetto the graves of high-ranking women can be followed over several generations, marked by the torque worn with a bronze bracelet on the left arm.

J. H. C. Williams has observed that this record sits awkwardly with the literary tradition of an early invasion. In the territory of the Cenomani La Tène material does not appear until well after the time the sources assign to the Gaulish settlement, which should be no later than the early 4th century BC, and most of the published finds belong to the 3rd century BC. Williams treats this gap as a difficulty for the idea of a single 4th century invasion.

The single recognized item of Italic type is a decorated bronze helmet from Gottolengo of the late 4th century BC. The exceptional tomb of Castiglione delle Stiviere, of the first half of the 3rd century BC and isolated in its Transpadane setting, held an Etruscan candelabrum, a set of metal vessels, and repoussé bronze sheet of Celtic workmanship, most likely a Cisalpine product. A proposal to reconstruct a carnyx from some of these pieces has not been accepted. The later cemeteries of Remedello and Valeggio sul Mincio belong mainly to the Gallo-Roman phase of the 2nd century BC.

Silver coins and harness fittings deposited at Manerbio have been taken to point to a possible federal sanctuary, of a date when the Roman victory had strengthened the position of the Cenomani. The Manerbio hoard included about 1,400 silver drachmas struck with the Lepontic legend toutiopouos, part of a coinage that circulated between Mediolanum and Verona. Ralph Haeussler relates legends of this kind to a shared political vocabulary rather than to the name of any one people, so the toutiopouos issues cannot be treated as a specifically Cenoman coinage.

The archaeologist Ermanno Arslan has cautioned that control of a territory by a dominant group such as the Cenomani need not imply cultural uniformity, and that the culture proper to the leading group has to be distinguished from those of the dependent communities settled across its territory.

== Genetics ==
Laffranchi et al. 2024 examined 12 samples of Cenomani Cisalpine Gauls from Verona who lived between the 3rd and 1st centuries BCE. The five examples of individual Y-DNA extracted were determined to belong to either haplogroup I2a1b1a1b1 or subclades of R1b1a1b (R-M269). The 12 samples of mtDNA extracted belonged to various subclades of haplogroup H, T, U, K, J and X. Ancient samples from the central European Bell Beaker, Hallstatt and Tumulus cultures belonged to these haplogroups as well.
