= Gaius Servilius Geminus (consul) =

Roman senator, consul and dictator (died 180 BC)

Gaius Servilius Geminus (died 180 BC) was a Roman statesman who served as Consul in 203 BC, Dictator in 202 BC (the last in 120 years), and Pontifex Maximus from 183 BC to 180 BC.

== Heritage ==
Geminus was the son of Gaius Servilius Geminus, a Roman magistrate. He was a member of gens Servilia, a patrician family.

== Early career ==
In 212 BC, Geminus was sent to Etruria to buy grain for the troops of the Roman garrison in Tarentum, then besieged by Hannibal. He successfully penetrated the city and delivered supplies. In 210 BC, he was elected Pontifex in place of Titus Otacilius Crassus, and in 209 BC was chosen as Aedile. He was selected to serve as magister equitum while exercising his position as Aedile, under dictator Titus Manlius Torquatus. In 206 BC, he became a praetor and obtained Sicily as a province.

== Consulship and later career ==
Geminus was elected consul, alongside Gnaeus Servilius Caepio, in 203 BC, and obtained Etruria as a province. From there he went to Cisalpine Gaul where his father of the same name was held as a prisoner of war since 218 BC. In 202 BC, Geminus was named Dictator by his brother Marcus Servilius Pulex Geminus to hold elections. He was the last person to hold that position until Lucius Cornelius Sulla in 82 or 81 BC. In 201 BC, he served as one of Decemviri responsible for the distribution of land among veterans who fought with Scipio Africanus. In 183 BC, Geminus was elected Pontifex Maximus, replacing Publius Licinius Crassus Dives.

== Bibliography ==
- Friedrich Münzer: Servilius 60. In: Realencyclopädie der Classischen Altertumswissenschaft (RE). Band II A,2, Stuttgart 1923, Sp. 1792–1794.
- Smith, William, ed. (1870). "Geminus, Gaius Servilius" . Dictionary of Greek and Roman Biography and Mythology. Vol. 3. p. 793b.

Political offices
| Preceded by M. Cornelius Cethegus; P. Sempronius Tuditanus | Roman consul 203 BC; With: Gnaeus Servilius Caepio | Succeeded by Tib. Claudius Nero; M. Servilius Pulex Geminus |
| Preceded by P. Licinius Crassus Dives | Pontifex maximus 183–180 BC | Succeeded by M. Aemilius Lepidus |
