= Gnaeus Servilius Caepio =

Gnaeus Servilius Caepio may refer to a number of Roman consuls or senators:

- Gnaeus Servilius Caepio (consul 253 BC)
- Gnaeus Servilius Caepio (consul 203 BC)
- Gnaeus Servilius Caepio (consul 169 BC)
- Gnaeus Servilius Caepio (consul 141 BC), censor in 125 BC
- Gnaeus Servilius Caepio (quaestor 105 BC)
- Gnaeus Servilius Caepio (died c. 66 BC), brother of Cato the Younger
