= Publius Sulpicius Galba Maximus =

3rd to early 2nd century BC Roman general and statesman

Publius Sulpicius Galba Maximus (fl. late 3rd to early 2nd century BC) was a Roman military officer and Senator who was elected Roman consul twice, and appointed dictator once. He fought in the Second Punic War and the First and Second Macedonian Wars.

== First consulship and the First Macedonian War ==
A member of the Patrician gens Sulpicia, Sulpicius Galba was the son of Servius Sulpicius Galba. Although he had held no previous curule magistracy, the crisis of the Second Punic War saw him elected consul in 211 BC, alongside Gnaeus Fulvius Centumalus Maximus. Entering his office on the Ides of March, both consuls defended the city of Rome against a surprise attack by the Carthaginian general Hannibal.

Once the immediate crisis abated, and Hannibal retreated back to the south of Italy, provinces were allotted to the consuls. Although both were assigned to Apulia, the Senate, believing that Hannibal no longer posed a grave threat, decreed that one of the consuls only should remain in Apulia, and that the other should be assigned Macedonia for his province. When lots were drawn as to who was to leave Apulia, Sulpicius Galba was appointed proconsul in Macedonia, succeeding Marcus Valerius Laevinus. There he continued fighting the First Macedonian War against Philip V of Macedon.

In early 210 BC, at the end of his consulship, his imperium was prolonged for another year, but due to the exaggerated reports which Laevinus had made of his own achievements during his proconsulship, Sulpicius Galba was ordered to disband his army, and retained the command of only one legion and of the socii navales (or the local fleet), and he was given a sum of money to ensure his troops were well supplied and provisioned. Given the size of his forces, Sulpicius Galba could not do much in 210 BC, but he did achieve the feat of leading the first Roman fleet into the Aegean Sea and capturing Aegina, which was plundered and given to the Aetolians, who were allied with the Romans. That same year he unsuccessfully tried to relieve Echinus, which was besieged by Philip of Macedon.

For the following year (209 BC), his imperium was again prolonged, with Macedonia and Greece as his provinces. Besides allying themselves with the Aetolian League, the Romans also allied themselves with Attalus I of Pergamon against Philip. Galba provided 1,000 Romans to help the Aetolians in the First Battle of Lamia, while he himself was stationed at Naupactus. When Philip appeared at Dyme on his march against Elis, Galba had landed with fifteen of his ships on the northern coast of the Peloponnesus, where his soldiers were ravaging and plundering the country. However, Philip's sudden arrival forced them to return to their camp at Naupactus. When Philip was forced to return to Macedon, which was threatened with an invasion by some neighbouring tribes, Galba sailed to Aegina, where he joined the fleet of Attalus, and where both took up their winter quarters.

In the spring of 208 BC, Galba and Attalus united their fleets of sixty ships in a joint operation, sailed to Lemnos, while Philip pulled together all of his resources to prepare for the expected assault. Attalus attacked Peparethus, and then crossed with Galba over to Nicaea. From there they moved to Euboea, to attack the town of Oreus, which was occupied by a Macedonian garrison, but was betrayed from within and surrendered to Galba. Encouraged by this easy conquest, he also made an attempt to take Chalcis, but found it was too difficult a task. He therefore sailed to Kynos, a port town of Locris. With Attalus being driven back to Asia Minor, Galba returned to Aegina, and remained in Greece for the remainder of his proconsulship, during which time he gave little further assistance to the Aetolian League in their war against Philip. In 205 BC, he was replaced as proconsul in Greece by Publius Sempronius Tuditanus.

== Dictatorship, second consulship and the Second Macedonian War ==
In 203 BC, Sulpicius Galba was appointed Dictator, with Marcus Servilius Pulex Geminus appointed his Master of the Horse. Galba was given the task of holding the comitia elections and to possibly prevent the consul Gnaeus Servilius Caepio from crossing over to Africa to confront Hannibal. He also spent the rest of the year investigating cities and prominent individuals who had been alienated by the war with Carthage.

In 200 BC, Sulpicius Galba was elected consul for a second time, this time with Gaius Aurelius Cotta as his colleague. During his consulship, he pushed to secure a renewal of the war against Philip V of Macedon. The people of Rome were very unhappy with a fresh war being undertaken before they had been able to recover from the ravages of the Second Punic War. When the prospect of war was proposed to the Roman assembly, it was rejected. However, Sulpicius reconvened the Assembly and made a speech warning the Roman people against ignoring the threat of Philip V. Fearing that Philip would come to invade Italy like Pyrrhus or Hannibal, the Assembly gave their assent and the Second Macedonian War against Philip was launched. When the consuls drew their lots for their consular commands, Galba once again obtained Macedonia as his province.

Galba was permitted to recruit from the army which Scipio Africanus had brought back from Africa any that were willing to serve again, but none of those veterans were to be compelled. After having selected his men and his ships, he sailed from Brundisium and landed at Apollonia, as per the plan to invade Macedonia from the west. On his arrival he met some Athenian ambassadors, who asked for his protection against the Macedonians, and he at once sent Gaius Claudius Centho with 20 ships and 1,000 men to their assistance. However, as the autumn was approaching when Galba arrived in his province, he took up his winter quarters in the vicinity of Apollonia.

In the spring of 199 BC, Sulpicius Galba advanced with his army through the lands of the Dassaretii, where all the towns and villages along his route surrendered to him, with only a few being taken by force. Both Philip and Galba were ignorant of each other's movements, until Macedonian and Roman scouting parties encountered each other by accident, during which a skirmish took place. Near the passes of Eordaia the two armies set up camp some distance from each other, and several minor engagements took place, in one of which the Romans sustained considerable losses. This was followed by a cavalry engagement, in which the Romans were again beaten, but the Macedonians, who were too eager in their pursuit of the enemy, suddenly found themselves attacked on their flanks, and were forced to retreat, during which Philip nearly lost his life.

Immediately after this defeat Philip sent a messenger to Galba to ask for a truce; the Roman commander deferred his decision till the next day, but during the night Philip and his army secretly left the camp, without the Romans knowing in which direction Philip had gone. After having stayed for a few days longer, Galba marched towards Pluvina, and then set up his camp on the banks of the river Osphagus, not far from the place where Philip had established his camp. Here Galba spent his time securing the territory and taking a number of towns, but did not directly engage Philip in battle. In the autumn Galba went back with his army to Apollonia. Although the campaign was considered only a minor military success, it did convince the Aetolians to ally with Rome.

In 198 BC, Sulpicius Galba was replaced in Macedonia by Publius Villius Tappulus, whereupon he returned to Rome. Then in 197 BC, both he and Villius Tappulus were appointed legates under Titus Quinctius Flamininus in Macedonia. In the next year (196 BC), when it was decreed at Rome that ten senatorial commissioners should be sent to help Flamininus settle political issues in Greece, as well as arrange a treaty between Rome and Macedonia, Galba and Tappulus were ordered to act as two of those commissioners. In 195 BC, he may have accompanied Tappulus on his mission to report on the aggressive movements of Antiochus III the Great.

In 193 BC, Galba was sent as an ambassador to Antiochus III along with Villius Tappulus. They first stopped to have discussions with Eumenes II of Pergamon, as they had been ordered, where the king urged the Romans to attack Antiochus at once. While staying at Pergamon, Galba fell ill. Once he had recovered, he and Tappulus travelled to Ephesus, where, instead of Antiochus, they met with Minion, whom the king had granted with full power to negotiate with the Romans. After futile negotiations, Galba returned to Rome, whereupon the Senate decided to declare war against Antiochus III, launching the Roman-Syrian War.

== Sources ==
- Broughton, T. Robert S., The Magistrates of the Roman Republic, Vol I (1951)
- Smith, William, Dictionary of Greek and Roman Biography and Mythology, Vol. II (1867)
- Livy, "History of Rome"

Political offices
Preceded by Appius Claudius Pulcher and Quintus Fulvius Flaccus	Consul of the Roman Republic with Gnaeus Fulvius Centumalus Maximus; 211 BC	Succeeded by Marcus Valerius Laevinus and Marcus Claudius Marcellus
Preceded by Gnaeus Cornelius Lentulus and Publius Aelius Paetus	Consul of the Roman Republic with Gaius Aurelius Cotta; 200 BC	Succeeded by Lucius Cornelius Lentulus and Publius Villius Tappulus
