= Tiberius Claudius Nero (consul 202 BC) =

Roman senator

Tiberius Claudius Nero (fl. 204–202 BC) was a Roman senator. In 204 BC, as praetor, he was assigned to govern Sardinia, where he gathered and shipped supplies of grain and clothing for soldiers under Scipio's command in Africa. Elected consul for 202 BC, he was assigned to Africa with imperium equal to that of Scipio, but storms and delays in preparations prevented him from ever arriving. His consular colleague was M. Servilius Pulex Geminus.

He was the last consul of the Claudii Nerones until his descendant (the future emperor) Tiberius was elected in 13 BC.

It is possible that this Nero was the one who participated in diplomatic missions in 172 BC, though historical sources pose difficulties. Livy says he was sent on an embassy with Marcus Decimius to Asia and islands in the Aegean, including Rhodes and Crete, and travelled as far as Syria and Egypt. His task was to renew friendships and alliances and gather information on the influence of Perseus of Macedon. Polybius says he was accompanied by Postumius Albinus and Marcus Junius Brutus, describing their mission as urging the allies, particularly Rhodes, to join the Romans against Perseus. Livy also has a similar account (42.45.1–7) that seems to repeat but confuse his earlier report. It is also possible that this Claudius Nero was either the Tiberius Claudius Nero who was praetor in 178 BC or the praetor of 181 BC with the same name. It is possible these two were the same person, possibly the consuls son.

Preceded by Cn. Servilius Caepio; C. Servilius Geminus	Roman consul 202 BC with M. Servilius Pulex Geminus	Succeeded by Cn. Cornelius Lentulus; P. Aelius Paetus
