= Servilia gens =

Ancient Roman family

The gens Servilia was a patrician family at ancient Rome. The gens was celebrated during the early ages of the Republic, and the names of few gentes appear more frequently at this period in the consular Fasti. It continued to produce men of influence in the state down to the latest times of the Republic, and even in the imperial period. The first member of the gens who obtained the consulship was Publius Servilius Priscus Structus in 495 BC, and the last of the name who appears in the consular Fasti is Quintus Servilius Silanus, in AD 189, thus occupying a prominent position in the Roman state for nearly seven hundred years.

Like other Roman gentes, the Servilii of course had their own sacra; and they are said to have worshipped a triens, or copper coin, which is reported to have increased or diminished in size at various times, thus indicating the increase or diminution of the honors of the gens. Although the Servilii were originally patricians, in the later Republic there were also plebeian Servilii.

== Origin ==
According to tradition, the Servilia gens was one of the Alban houses removed to Rome by Tullus Hostilius, and enrolled by him among the patricians. It was, consequently, one of the gentes minores. The nomen Servilius is a patronymic surname, derived from the praenomen Servius, meaning "one who keeps safe" or "preserves".

== Praenomina ==
The different branches of the Servilii each used slightly different sets of praenomina. The oldest stirpes used the praenomina Publius, Quintus, Spurius, and Gaius. The Servilii Caepiones used primarily Gnaeus and Quintus. The Servilii Gemini employed Gnaeus, Quintus, Publius, Gaius, and Marcus.

The gens must also have used the praenomen Servius, but no longer used it in historical times, possibly due to its similar sound to the Latin word for slave (servus).

== Branches and cognomina ==
The Servilii were divided into numerous families; of these the names in the Republican period are Ahala, Axilla, Caepio, Casca, Geminus, Glaucia, Globulus, Priscus (with the agnomen Fidenas), Rullus, Structus, Tucca, and Vatia (with the agnomen Isauricus). The Structi, Prisci, Ahalae, and Caepiones were patricians; the Gemini originally patrician, and later plebeian; the Vatiae and Cascae plebeians. Other cognomina appear under the Empire. The only surnames found on coins are those of Ahala, Caepio, Casca, and Rullus.

The cognomen Structus almost always occurs in connection with those of Priscus or Ahala. The only two Structi who are mentioned with this cognomen are Spurius Servilius Structus, who was consular tribune in 368 BC, and Spurius Servilius Structus, consul in 476 BC. The fact that Structus appears in two of the oldest stirpes of the Servilii, neither of which clearly predates the other, could indicate that persons bearing this surname were ancestral to both great houses.

The Prisci ("antique") were an ancient family of the Servilia gens, and filled the highest offices of the state during the early years of the Republic. They also bore the agnomen of Structus, which is always appended to their name in the Fasti, till it was supplanted by that of Fidenas, which was first obtained by Quintus Servilius Priscus Structus, who took Fidenae in his dictatorship, in 435 BC, and which was also borne by his descendants.

Ahala, of which Axilla is merely another form, is a diminutive of ala, a wing. A popular legend related that the name was first given to Gaius Servilius, magister equitum in 439 BC, because he hid the knife with which he slew Spurius Maelius in his armpit (also ala). However, this does not appear to be the case, since the name had been in use by the family for at least a generation before that event.

The surnames Caepio and Geminus appear almost simultaneously in the middle of the third century BC, with the consuls of 253 and 252. Each was the grandson of a Gnaeus Servilius, suggesting that the two cognomina belonged to two branches of the same family. Caepio, an onion, belongs to a large class of surnames derived from ordinary objects, while Geminus originally denoted a twin, and was typically given to the younger of two brothers. In a discussion concerning appearances, Cicero mentions a certain Quintus Servilius Geminus, who was frequently mistaken for his brother, Publius, the consul of 252 BC. The Servilii Vatiae ("cross-legged") seem to be descended from the Gemini.

== Members ==
=== Servilii Prisci et Structi ===
- Publius Servilius Priscus Structus, consul in 495 BC, defeated the Sabines and the Aurunci.
- Quintus Servilius (Priscus Structus), magister equitum in 494 BC.
- Spurius (or Gaius) Servilius (P. f.?) Structus, consul in 476 BC, repulsed in his attempt to retake the Janiculum from the Etruscans.
- Quintus Servilius (Structus?) Priscus, consul in 468 and 466 BC.
- Publius Servilius Sp. f. P. n. Priscus, consul in 463 BC, was carried off in his consulship by the great plague which raged at Rome in this year.
- Quintus Servilius P. f. Sp. n. Priscus, dictator in 435 and 418 BC, captured the town of Fidenae, thereby obtaining the surname Fidenas.
- Quintus Servilius Q. f. P. n. Fidenas, consular tribune in 402, 398, 395, 390, 388, and 386 BC.
- Quintus Servilius Q. f. Q. n. Fidenas, consular tribune in 382, 378, and 369 BC.
- Spurius Servilius Priscus, censor in 378 BC.
- Gaius Servilius Structus, grandfather of the consular tribune in 368 BC.
- Gaius Servilius C. f. Structus, father of the consular tribune in 368 BC.
- Spurius Servilius C. f. C. n. Structus, consular tribune in 368 BC.

=== Servilii Ahalae ===
- Gaius Servilius Structus Ahala, consul in 478 BC, died in his year of office.
- Gaius Servilius Ahala, allegedly magister equitum in 439 BC, slew Spurius Maelius.
- Quintus Servilius C. f. Ahala, father of Gaius Servilius Axilla, consular tribune from 419 to 417 BC.
- Gaius Servilius Q. f. C. n. Axilla, consul in 427 BC, consular tribune in 419, 418 and 417 BC, and magister equitum in 418.
- Publius Servilius Q. f. (C. n.) Ahala, father of Gaius, the magister equitum of 408 BC.
- Gaius Servilius P. f. Q. n. Ahala, consular tribune in 408, 407, and 402 BC, and magister equitum in 408.
- Gaius Servilius Ahala, magister equitum in 389 and 385 BC.
- Quintus Servilius Q. f. Ahala, father of Quintus Servilius Ahala, the consul of 365 BC.
- Quintus Servilius Q. f. Q. n. Ahala, consul in 365 and 362 BC, and dictator in 360.
- Quintus Servilius Q. f. Q. n. Ahala, magister equitum in 351 and consul in 342 BC.

=== Servilii Caepiones ===
- Gnaeus Servilius, grandfather of the consul of 253 BC.
- Gnaeus Servilius Cn. f., father of the consul of 253 BC.
- Gnaeus Servilius Cn. f. Cn. n. Caepio, consul in 253 BC, during the First Punic War, sailed to the coast of Africa with his colleague, Gaius Sempronius Blaesus.
- Gnaeus Servilius Cn. f. Cn. n. Caepio, father of the consul of 203 BC.
- Gnaeus Servilius Cn. f. Cn. n. Caepio, consul in 203 BC, during the Second Punic War.
- Gnaeus Servilius Cn. f. Cn. n. Caepio, consul in 169 BC.
- Quintus Fabius Q. f. Q. n. Maximus Servilianus, son of Gnaeus Servilius Caepio, the consul of 169 BC, and brother of Gnaeus, consul in 141, and Quintus, consul in 140, was adopted by Quintus Fabius Maximus Aemilianus. He was consul in 142 BC.
- Gnaeus Servilius Cn. f. Cn. n. Caepio, consul in 141 and censor in 125 BC.
- Servilia, wife of Quintus Lutatius Catulus.
- Servilia, wife of Marcus Livius Drusus.
- Quintus Servilius Cn. f. Cn. n. Caepio, consul in 140 BC, during the Lusitanian War.
- Quintus Servilius Q. f. Cn. n. Caepio, consul in 106 BC, during the Cimbrian War. His army was annihilated at the Battle of Arausio in 105.
- Gnaeus Servilius Caepio, quaestor around 105 BC, may have been the father of Servilia, the wife of Appius Claudius Pulcher, who died in a shipwreck while still young.
- Quintus Servilius (Q. f. Q. n.) Caepio, quaestor urbanus in 103 BC, was killed in an ambush at Asculum in Picenum, at the beginning of the Social War.
- Servilia Q. f. Q. n., mistress of Julius Caesar and mother of Marcus Brutus, the tyrannicide.
- Servilia Q. f. Q. n., married Lucullus, the conqueror of Mithridates.
- Quintus Servilius Caepio, adoptive father of Brutus. He probably married a daughter of the orator Hortensius.
- Servilius Caepio, military tribune during the war against Spartacus, in 72 BC.
- Servilius Caepio, a supporter of Caesar, to whose daughter, Julia, he was once betrothed.
- Quintus Servilius Q. f. Caepio Brutus, the name taken by Marcus Junius Brutus, the tyrannicide, when he was adopted by his uncle, the military tribune of 72 BC.

=== Servilii Gemini ===
- Gnaeus Servilius, grandfather of Publius Servilius Geminus, the consul of 252 and 248 BC. Possibly the same Gnaeus Servilius who was the ancestor of the Caepiones.
- Quintus Servilius Cn. f., father of Quintus and Publius Servilius Geminus.
- Publius Servilius Q. f. Cn. n. Geminus, consul in 252 and 248 BC, during the First Punic War.
- Quintus Servilius Q. f. Cn. n. Geminus, twin brother of the consul Publius Servilius Geminus.
- Gnaeus Servilius P. f. Q. n. Geminus, consul in 217 BC, slain at the Battle of Cannae in 216.
- Gaius Servilius P. f. (Geminus), praetor before 218 BC, taken prisoner by the Boii that year. Either he or his sons went over to the plebeians.
- Gaius Servilius C. f. P. n. (Geminus), (Note: The Fasti do not give him the surname Geminus, but do so for his brother, Marcus Servilius Pulex. Livy, however, refers to him as such several times.) consul in 203 and dictator in 202 BC, and later pontifex maximus.
- Marcus Servilius C. f. P. n. Pulex Geminus, consul in 202 BC.
- Marcus Servilius M. f. (Geminus), consul in AD 3.

=== Servilii Vatiae ===
- Marcus Servilius, grandfather of the consul of 79 BC.
- Gaius Servilius M. f. Vatia, father of the consul of 79 BC.
- Gaius Servilius C. f. M. n. Vatia, praetor in 102 BC
- Marcus Servilius C. f. M. n. Vatia, triumvir monetalis in 100 BC
- Publius Servilius C. f. M. n. Vatia, surnamed Isauricus, consul in 79 and censor in 55 BC, triumphed over the Isauri.
- Publius Servilius P. f. C. n. Isauricus, consul in 48 and 41 BC.
- Publius Servilius P. f. P. n. Isauricus, praetor in 25 BC
- Servilia P. f. P. n., betrothed to Octavian until the formation of the second triumvirate in 43 BC.

=== Servilii Rulli ===
- Publius Servilius M. f. Rullus, triumvir monetalis in 100 BC.
- Publius Servilius P. f. M. n. Rullus, tribune of the plebs in 63 BC, proposed an agrarian law.
- Publius Servilius (P. f. P. n.) Rullus, one of the generals of Octavian against Mark Antony after the Perusinian War, in 40 BC.

=== Others ===
- Gaius Servilius Tucca, consul in 284 BC.
- Gaius Servilius Casca, tribune of the plebs in 212 BC, failed to intervene on behalf of his relative, Marcus Postumius Pyrgensis. The authenticity of his cognomen has been doubted.
- Gaius Servilius Glaucia, praetor in 100 BC, a supporter of Lucius Appuleius Saturninus, with whom he perished.
- Quintus Servilius, praetor in 90 BC, was slain by the inhabitants of Asculum on the outbreak of the Social War.
- Servilius, praetor in 88 BC, tried to dissuade Sulla from marching onto Rome, only to be mistreated by Sulla's soldiers.
- Publius Servilius, an eques, magister of one of the companies that farmed the taxes in Sicilia during the administration of Verres.
- Publius Servilius Globulus, tribune of the plebs in 67 BC, and propraetor of Asia in 63.
- Gaius Servilius, a Roman citizen in Sicilia, publicly scourged by Verres.
- Marcus Servilius, accused of repetundae in 51 BC.
- Marcus Servilius, tribune of the plebs in 44 BC, praised by Cicero as a vir fortissimus.
- Publius Servilius Casca Longus, one of Caesar's assassins, died shortly after the Battle of Philippi, in 42 BC.
- (Servilius) Casca, brother of Publius Longus, and like him a conspirator against Caesar. (Note: T.J. Cadoux distinguishes the unnamed brother from Gaius Casca, tribune of the plebs in 44 BC, who was probably not a Servilius. Appian was only aware of Publius, but incorrectly referred to him as Gaius, probably in confusion with the tribune. Cadoux's arguments for the existence of 3 Cascae – the two conspirators and the tribune – were accepted by Shackleton Bailey and Broughton.)
- Marcus Servilius Nonianus, consul in AD 35, and one of the most celebrated orators and historians of his time.
- Servilius Damocrates, a physician at Rome during the first century.
- Marcia Servilia, daughter of Barea Soranus, accused and condemned with her father in AD 66.
- Quintus Servilius Pudens, consul in AD 166.
- Marcus Servilius Silanus, consul in AD 188.
- Quintus Servilius Silanus, consul in AD 189.

== Descent of the Servilii of the late Republic ==
This family tree depicts the Servilii Caepiones, Gemini, and Vatiae, from the third century BC to their known descendants in imperial times, extending down to the family of the emperor Galba. The chart is based on one by Friedrich Münzer.

Stemma Caepionum et Geminorum

Cn. Servilius
Cn. Servilius	Q. Servilius
Cn. Servilius; Caepio cos. 253 BC	Q. Servilius; Geminus	P. Servilius; Geminus cos. 252, 248 BC
Cn. Servilius; Caepio	Cn. Servilius; Geminus cos. 217 BC	C. Servilius; Geminus pr. c. 220 BC
Cn. Servilius; Caepio cos. 203 BC	C. Servilius; Geminus cos. 203 BC, dict. 202	M. Servilius; Pulex; Geminus cos. 202 BC
Cn. Servilius; Caepio cos. 169 BC	C. Servilius (Geminus) aed. pl. 173 BC	M. Servilius (Geminus) trib. mil. 181 BC pont. 170
Q. Fabius; Maximus; Servilianus cos. 142 BC	Cn. Servilius; Caepio cos. 141 BC, cens. 125	Q. Servilius; Caepio cos. 140 BC	M. Servilius	C. Servilius; Vatia pr. after 146 BC
Q. Fabius; Maximus; Eburnus cos. 116 BC	Q. Servilius; Caepio cos. 106 BC	C. Servilius; IIIvir mon. 93 BC	C. Servilius (Vatia) pr. 102 BC	P. Servilius; Vatia Isauricus cos. 79 BC cens. 55	M. Servilius; Vatia; IIIvir mon. 89 BC
Q. Servilius; Caepio q. 103 BC m. Livia	Cn. Servilius; Caepio pr. 90 BC	C. Servilius; IIIvir mon. 63 BC	P. Servilius; Isauricus cos. 48, 41 BC
Servilia m. (1) M. Junius; Brutus d. 77 BC m. (2) D. Junius; Silanus cos. 62 BC	Q. Servilius; Caepio d. 59 BC	Servilia m. L. Licinius; Lucullus cos. 74 BC	P. Servilius; Vatia pr. 25 BC	Servilia m. M. Aemilius; Lepidus
M. Junius; Brutus d. 42 BC m. (1) Claudia m. (2) Porcia	Junia; Prima	Junia; Secunda m. M. Aemilius; Lepidus; IIIvir	Junia; Tertia m. C. Cassius; Longinus d. 42 BC	L. Licinius; Lucullus
M. Aemilius; Lepidus d. 30 BC m. Servilia	C. Cassius; Longinus
M'. Aemilius; Lepidus cos. AD 11	Aemilia Lepida ex. AD 20 m. (1) Mam. Aemilius Scaurus cos. suf. AD 21 m. (2) P. Sulpicius Quirinius cos. 12 BC
Aemilia Lepida m. Ser. Sulpicius; Galba cos. AD 33; Imp. 68–69	Aemilia
C. Livius; Ocella Galba d. c. AD 48	Ser. Livius; Ocella Galba d. c. AD 60

== See also ==
- List of Roman gentes
- Tomb of Servilia

== Bibliography ==
=== Ancient sources ===
- Marcus Tullius Cicero, Academica Priora, De Finibus Bonorum et Malorum, Epistulae ad Atticum, Epistulae ad Familiares, In Verrem, Philippicae, Pro Fonteio.
- Diodorus Siculus, Bibliotheca Historica (Library of History).
- Dionysius of Halicarnassus, Romaike Archaiologia (Roman Antiquities).
- Titus Livius (Livy), History of Rome.
- Marcus Velleius Paterculus, Compendium of Roman History.
- Valerius Maximus, Factorum ac Dictorum Memorabilium (Memorable Facts and Sayings).
- Gaius Plinius Secundus (Pliny the Elder), Historia Naturalis (Natural History).
- Sextus Julius Frontinus, De Aquaeductu (On Aqueducts).
- Plutarchus, Lives of the Noble Greeks and Romans.
- Gaius Suetonius Tranquillus, De Vita Caesarum (Lives of the Caesars, or The Twelve Caesars).
- Appianus Alexandrinus (Appian), Bellum Civile (The Civil War).
- Cassius Dio, Roman History.
- Aelius Lampridius, Aelius Spartianus, Flavius Vopiscus, Julius Capitolinus, Trebellius Pollio, and Vulcatius Gallicanus, Historia Augusta (Augustan History).
- Paulus Orosius, Historiarum Adversum Paganos (History Against the Pagans).

=== Modern sources ===
- Broughton, T. Robert S. (1952–1986). The Magistrates of the Roman Republic. American Philological Association.
- Chase, George Davis (1897). "The Origin of Roman Praenomina". Harvard Studies in Classical Philology. 8: 103–184. doi:10.2307/310491. ISSN 0073-0688. JSTOR 310491.
- Crawford, Michael (1974). Roman Republican Coinage. Cambridge University Press.
- Eckhel, Joseph Hilarius (1792–1798). Doctrina Numorum Veterum [The Study of Ancient Coins].
- August Pauly; Georg Wissowa; Wilhelm Kroll; Kurt Witte; Karl Mittelhaus; Konrat Ziegler, eds. (1894–1980). Paulys Realencyclopädie der classischen Altertumswissenschaft. Stuttgart: J. B. Metzler.
- Smith, William, ed. (1849). Dictionary of Greek and Roman Biography and Mythology. Boston: Little, Brown and Company.
