= Spurius Ligustinus =

Centurion in the Roman army

Spurius Ligustinus was a Roman of Sabine origin soldier and centurion in the Roman army during the 2nd century BC.

== Life ==
Spurius Ligustinus was a Sabine man whose father left him a jugerum of land and the small cottage in which Spurius was born, grew up, and continued to live throughout his life. As soon as he came of age, he married one of his cousins. Although she had no dowry and they began their life together moderately poor, they soon built themselves up into being reasonably wealthy. He also had eight children, six sons and two daughters, who would gain social rank. During the consulship of Publius Sulpicius Galba Maximus and Gaius Aurelius (200 BC), Sp. Ligustinus joined the Roman army.

In his first two years of being a soldier, he participated in the Macedonian Campaign against King Philip V of Macedon. In his third year of service, Titus Quinctius Flamininus promoted Sp. Ligustinus to centurion of the 10th maniple of hastati because of his bravery. After the Macedonians were defeated and he had returned home as his unit was demobilized, he promptly went to Hispania as a volunteer under the consulship of Marcus Porcius Cato (195 BC). During the campaign, he was promoted again to centurion of the 1st century of hastati, again for bravery. Sp. Ligustinus volunteered to fight, this time against the Aetolians led by King Antiochus III the Great, under the consulship of Manius Acilius Glabrio (191 BC). Sp. Ligustinus was promoted to centurion of the 1st century of principes. After they had driven out King Antiochus in the Battle of Thermopylae, he returned to Italy. Soon after, he fought in two campaigns in which he served for a year. Thereafter, he served an additional two campaigns in Hispania, one under Quintus Fulvius Flaccus who was acting as Praetor (182 BC - 181 BC), the other under Tiberius Sempronius Gracchus (180 BC). Quintus Fulvius Flaccus requested he go to Rome with a few other officers for his triumph because of their bravery.

He was soon asked to go back to Spain by Tiberius Sempronius Gracchus, and four times during the three years in Spain he was made first centurion of the 1st century of the triarii. After serving twenty two years in the army, he petitioned the consulate for a further promotion. Sp. Ligustinus ended his speech to the consulate:

But even if I had not served my full time and my age did not give me exemption, still, P. Licinius, as I was able to give you four soldiers for one, namely, myself, it would have been a right and proper thing that I should be discharged. But I want you to take what I have said simply as a statement of my case. So far as anyone who is raising troops judges me to be an efficient soldier, I am not going to plead excuses. What rank the military tribunes think that I deserve is for them to decide; I will take care that no man shall surpass me in courage; that I always have done so, my commanders and fellow-campaigners bear witness. And as for you, my comrades, though you are only exercising your right of appeal, it is but just and proper that as in your early days you never did anything against the authority of the magistrates and the senate, so now, too, you should place yourselves at the disposal of the senate and the consuls and count any position in which you are to defend your country as an honourable one." (Livy 42.34)

After his speech, the consulate was moved by his words, and took him to the senate, where he was again thanked. Spurius Ligustinus received the promotion of Primus pilus (First Centurion) of the First Legion. There is no other mention of him in Livy or other Roman writings, yet he had an excellent career in the army, and was a hero of his time.

== Awards ==
Spurius Ligustinus was awarded the following for his acts of bravery and demonstrations of exemplary leadership:

- 34 times for great/courageous acts
- 6 Civic Crowns
- Took part in a Roman triumph
- Primus pilus of the First Legion

== Wars ==
Spurius Ligustinus fought in the following wars:

- Second Macedonian War
- Hispania Citerior Campaign
- Aetolian War
- First Celtiberian War
- Lusitanian War
- Numantine War/Second Celtiberian War
