= Publius Servilius Rullus (cavalry leader) =

1st century BC Roman cavalry leader

Publius Servilius Rullus was a member of the Roman gens Servilia and in 40 BC a cavalry leader of Octavian (the future Emperor Augustus).

He was probably a son of the tribunus plebis of the same name and is only mentioned in autumn 40 BC as cavalry leader of Octavian. In the winter 41/40 BC Octavian had won the Perusinian War against Lucius Antonius and Fulvia, who were the brother and the wife of the triumvir Mark Antony respectively. A half year later, in autumn 40 BC, Mark Antony returned from his sojourn in the East of the Roman Empire, but was not allowed to land with his fleet in the harbour of Brundisium. Therefore, he laid siege to this city and meanwhile captured Sipontum. Marcus Vipsanius Agrippa, a close friend of Octavian and able general, could retake Sipontum, but Rullus, who commanded 1500 horsemen, lost a cavalry battle near the town of Hyria, although Antony had only 400 riders at his side. The triumvirs soon settled their conflict temporary by concluding the treaty of Brundisium. Later Rullus does not appear in any sources.
