= Publius Villius Tappulus =

Plebeian Aedile
- In office 204 BCE – 204 BCE

Praetor
- In office 203 BCE – 203 BCE
- Preceded by: Lucius Scribonius Libo
- Succeeded by: Gnaeus Tremellius Flaccus

Consul
- Preceded by: Gaius Aurelius Cotta
- Succeeded by: Sextus Aelius Paetus Catus

Military service
- Allegiance: Roman Republic
- Years of service: 199-196 BCE
- Rank: Legate
- Commands: Legiones Cannenses

Publius Villius Tappulus was a politician of the Roman Republic.

== Biography ==
In 204 BC Tappulus was appointed plebeian aedile. In the following two years, he was elected as a praetor and then served as a propraetor in Sicily. After his time as a Praetor he would lend Cneius Tremellius two legions for the Second Punic War. In 201 BC he held the decemvirate (decemvir agris dandis adsignandis) for distributing ager publicus in Samnium and Apulia.

He became consul in 199 BC and went to Macedon to take over the command after Publius Sulpicius Galba Maximus. However, before it came to major battles, he had been replaced by the next consul Titus Quinctius Flamininus. In 199 BCE the legions Publius was commanding mutinied. They mutinied because they believed they were being illegally forced against their will to fight. Publius caved in, saying that after the campaign the soldiers would retire. Pausanias states that during the war with Macedon Villius destroyed the Greek cities of Histiaia on Euboia and Antikyra in Phokis and it was for this reason Flamininus replaced him.

During 197 BC he was still in Macedon as a legatus. A year later he served as an envoy for peace negotiations with Philip V of Macedon and Antiochus III the Great. During the cold war with the Seleucid Empire he served again as an envoy to Antiochus. The only reference to him exists on the triumphal arch of Augustus, fragments of which are called the Fasti Capitolini, and Horace's Satires.

Political offices
| Preceded by Publius Sulpicius Galba Maximus and Gaius Aurelius Cotta | Consul of the Roman Republic with Lucius Cornelius Lentulus; 199 BC | Succeeded by Titus Quinctius Flamininus and Sextus Aelius Paetus Catus |
