= Lucius Cornelius Lentulus (consul 199 BC) =

Roman consul in 199 BC

Lucius Cornelius Lentulus was a consul of the Roman Republic in 199 BC with Publius Villius Tappulus as his colleague.

He was brother of Gnaeus Cornelius Lentulus, the consul of 201 BC.

Cornelius Lentulus achieved the praetorship in 211 BC and served in Sardinia. He then succeeded Scipio Africanus as proconsul in Spain, though he was denied a triumph upon his return in 200 BC. He was rewarded by becoming consul in the following year. He died in 173 BC.

Political offices
Preceded by Publius Sulpicius Galba Maximus, and Gaius Aurelius Cotta	Consul of the Roman Republic with Publius Villius Tappulus; 199 BC	Succeeded by Titus Quinctius Flamininus, and Sextus Aelius Paetus Catus
