= Gnaeus Cornelius Lentulus (consul 201 BC) =

Gnaeus Cornelius Lentulus (consul 201 BC) served as quaestor of the Roman Republic in 212 BC, curule aedile and consul in 201 BC. His brother Lucius Cornelius Lentulus was also consul in 199 BC. Gnaeus was possibly the son of L. Cornelius L. f. L. n. Lentulus Caudinus, curule aedile in 209 BC, though the presence of the praenomen Gnaeus, along with the absence of the agnomen Caudinus, are opposed to this connection.

== Career ==
He wished for the province of Africa, that he might conclude the war with Carthage; but this well-earned glory was reserved for Publius Cornelius Scipio Africanus by the Senate. Lentulus had the command of the fleet on the coast of Sicily, with orders to pass over to Africa if necessary. Scipio used to say, that but for Lentulus' greediness he should have destroyed Carthage. Cn. Lentulus was proconsul in Hither Spain in 199 BC, and received an ovation for his services.

In Book 18 of The Histories, Greek historian Polybius mentions a journey undertaken by Gnaeus Lentulus to meet with King Philip so as to encourage an alliance with Rome.

Political offices
| Preceded by Marcus Servilius Pulex Geminus; Tiberius Claudius Nero | Roman consul 201 BC with Publius Aelius Paetus | Succeeded by Publius Sulpicius Galba Maximus; Gaius Aurelius Cotta |
