= Publius Licinius Crassus Dives =

Publius Licinius Crassus Dives was the name of several Roman politicians:

- Publius Licinius Crassus Dives (consul 205 BC)
- Publius Licinius Crassus Dives Mucianus (180 BC – 130 BC)
