= Publius Aelius Paetus =

2nd-century BC Roman consul

Publius Aelius Paetus (fl. c. 240 BC – 174 BC) was a Roman consul of the late 3rd century BC. He was a prominent supporter of Scipio Africanus, and was elected censor with Africanus in 199.

== Family ==
Publius Aelius Paetus was apparently the elder surviving son of Quintus Aelius Paetus, a praetor who was killed at Cannae in August 216 BC. The father may have been descended from Publius Aelius Paetus, who was consul in 337 BC and a Master of the Horse, and as such, one of the earliest plebeian consuls; another ancestor may have been Gaius Aelius Paetus, consul in 286 BC.

His younger brother was Sextus Aelius Paetus Catus who became consul in 198 and censor in 194, and is best known to us via Cicero as a jurist and commentator on the Twelve Tables.

== Political life ==
Aelius Paetus makes relatively few appearances in Livy's History of Rome. He was aedile in 204 BC, was elected praetor in 203 BC and then selected as Master of the Horse, and became consul in 201 with Gnaeus Cornelius L.f. Lentulus.

In his year as consul, he made a treaty with the Ingauni Ligures and was appointed one of the ten decemvirs for the distribution of lands of the ager publicus among the veteran soldiers of Scipio Africanus in Samnium and Apulia.

In 199 he was elected censor with Africanus himself. The two censors were relatively liberal in their lustrum and degraded none.

Paetus died in 174 during a pestilence at Rome, as recorded by Livy in a fragmentary chapter.

His son was Quintus Aelius Paetus, who became consul in 167.

Political offices
Preceded by Marcus Servilius Pulex Geminus; Tiberius Claudius Nero	Roman consul 201 BC with Gnaeus Cornelius Lentulus	Succeeded by Publius Sulpicius Galba Maximus; Gaius Aurelius Cotta
Preceded by Marcus Livius Salinator; Gaius Claudius Nero	Roman censor 199–198 BC with Scipio Africanus	Succeeded by Sextus Aelius Paetus Catus; Gaius Cornelius Cethegus
