= Marcus Cornelius Cethegus (consul 204 BC) =

Roman senator and general

Marcus Cornelius Cethegus (c. 248 BC – 196 BC) was a Roman Republican consul and censor during the Second Punic War, best known as a political ally of his kinsman Scipio Africanus.

== Political career ==
He was chosen as curule aedile in 213 BC, with his young kinsman Scipio Africanus as his colleague (although Scipio was under-age, being only 22 or 23 compared to the usual mid-thirties). He was appointed pontifex to replace the pontifex maximus Lucius Cornelius Lentulus Caudinus who had died.

In 211 BC, as praetor, he was in charge of Apulia. In 209 BC, before he had been consul, he was elected censor with Publius Sempronius Tuditanus. During their censorship, Cethegus disagreed with his colleague about which senator should be elected Princeps Senatus. Tuditanus had the right of choice and chose Quintus Fabius Maximus Verrucosus, while Cethegus wanted the most senior censor Titus Manlius Torquatus to be the Princeps Senatus.

In 204 BC, he was elected consul, possibly to aid his kinsman Scipio, then in Africa. In 203 BC he was proconsul in Italia Superior, where, in conjunction with the praetor Publius Quintilius Varus, he gained a hard-won victory over Mago Barca, Hannibal's brother, at the Battle of Insubria, which forced him to retreat from Italy.

He died in 196 BC during an epidemic in Rome.

== Other roles ==
He had a great reputation as an orator, and is characterised by Ennius as the quintessence of persuasiveness (suadae medulla). Horace calls him an authority on the use of Latin words.

Political offices
| Preceded by Scipio Africanus; Publius Licinius Crassus Dives | Roman consul 204 BC; With: Publius Sempronius Tuditanus | Succeeded by Gnaeus Servilius Caepio; Gaius Servilius Geminus |
