= Sextus Aelius Paetus Catus =

2nd-century BC Roman consul

Sextus Aelius Paetus Catus (fl. 198 – 194 BC) or Sextus Aelius Q.f. Paetus Catus (or "the clever one"), was a Roman Republican consul, elected in 198 BC. Today, he is best known for his interpretation of the laws of the Twelve Tables, which is known to us only through the praise of Cicero. Paetus Catus came from a prominent plebeian noble family; his father was a praetor, and his elder brother was another consul, Publius Aelius Paetus.

== Family ==
Sextus Aelius Paetus was apparently the younger surviving son of Quintus Aelius Paetus, a praetor who was one of the many Roman senators killed at Cannae in August 216 BC. Other members of the gens Aelia who rose to high office included Publius Aelius Paetus, who was consul in 337 BC, and Gaius Aelius Paetus, consul in 286 BC. Both earlier consuls may have been ancestors, or collateral kinsmen, but the connection is not mentioned by the Roman historian Livy.

Paetus's elder brother became Master of the Horse in 202, and consul in the following year. Other members of the family, including Publius's son, succeeded to the consulship in later years.

== Political career ==
Little is known of Paetus Catus's political career, or how he acquired the additional cognomen of "Catus". Livy mentions that he was curule aedile in 200 BC, when he imported grain from Africa.

According to an Oxford dictionary of Roman jurists, Paetus Catus's rapid rise from curule aedile to the consulship and censorship was not due to his father's death or his elder brother's successes, but his aptitude for the law. He was apparently nicknamed “catus” meaning “clever” or "the clever one" in recognition of his legal skills. Catus may have given up other aspects of his public career (he is not mentioned in any military action by Livy) to devote his time to the study of law. The Oxford dictionary believes that he may have been the first professional jurist in the history of Rome. (It is not clear if earlier jurists were not professional, or were part-timers, but a Roman paterfamilias of rank and status, or his grown sons, would be expected to defend his family's clients in legal matters. Perhaps the Punic War meant that too many such patrons were away from Rome, and unable to handle legal matters).

His brother Publius Aelius Paetus had been consul three years earlier in 201, and was elected censor 199. Publius's success may have helped Sextus to the consulship in 198, but he was overshadowed by his younger and eventually more famous patrician colleague, Titus Quinctius T.f. Flamininus, then aged only thirty.

Sextus did not distinguish himself militarily during his consulship, with all honours, including the Macedonian/Greek campaigns, going to his much younger colleague Flamininus. His own efforts in his assigned province were not marked with much success. However, he was still elected censor in 194 with Gaius Cornelius Cethegus, possibly out of respect for his skills as a jurist, possibly out of respect for his elder brother, a former censor.

== Paetus, the jurist ==
Aelius Paetus and his brother Publius were both apparently jurists. Sextus was author of a work, Commentaria tripartita or tripertita , which systematically set out each provision of the Twelve Tables, provided a commentary, and then discussed a relevant action-at-law for each provision. Another work called Ius Aelianum discussed actions-at-law only. The former work was praised by no less a judge than Cicero, and was evidently extant during the lifetime of his friend Titus Pomponius Atticus who refers to it. When the work disappeared is unknown.

== See also ==
- Aelia (gens)

== Sources ==
- Information on the career and works of Sextus Aelius Paetus from an Oxford University site (accessed via Google cache). Retrieved 30 May 2007.
- Livy. History of Rome.
- German Wikipedia entry on Sextus Aelius Paetus, consul 198 BC, which cites
  - Livius 32, 7
  - Pomponius Dig. 1,2,2,38
  - Cicero de Rep. I, 18; III, 22

Political offices
Preceded by Lucius Cornelius Lentulus and Publius Villius Tappulus	Consul of the Roman Republic with Titus Quinctius Flamininus; 198 BC	Succeeded by Gaius Cornelius Cethegus and Quintus Minucius Rufus
Preceded by Publius Cornelius Scipio Africanus and Publius Aelius Paetus	Censor of the Roman Republic with Gaius Cornelius Cethegus; 194 BC	Succeeded by Titus Quinctius Flamininus and Marcus Claudius Marcellus
