= Publius Servilius Rullus =

Roman plebeian tribune in 63 BC

Denarius of Publius Servilius Rullus

Publius Servilius Rullus was plebeian tribune of the Roman Republic in 63 BC. He proposed an agrarian law aimed at redistributing land for the landless poor in Rome to farm. We know about this through the speeches delivered by Marcus Tullius Cicero against this bill. Cicero delivered four speeches. Three are extant. The beginning of the first speech is missing. The fourth speech is lost. We do not have any other sources except for passing references by Plutarch and Suetonius.

== Agrarian bill ==
The bill provided for the election of a ten-man commission (decemviri) which would have authority for five years. Its task was to distribute land to 5,000 colonists in lots of ten jugera in the ager Campanus and in lots of twelve jugera in the nearby campus Stellaris (both areas were in Campania, north of Naples). Further plots of land were intended and land was to be bought for this. To raise funds for this, the decemviri were empowered to sell public land whose sale had been recommended by senatus consulta (written advice by the senate) since 81 BC, but had not been carried out. It was also empowered to sell domains outside Italy which had become public property in 88 BC or later. The decimviri were also authorised to tax public land outside Italy, to use the Vectigalia from 63 BC and the gold and silver from war booty not paid into the treasury or spent on monuments. Military commanders gave some of their booty to the state treasury and spent some of it to build temples and public facilities or to erect statues. Pompey was exempted from this. He was commanding the Roman troops in the last phase of the Third Mithridatic War (73–63 BC) against Pontus and Armenia (in present-day eastern Turkey). Because of his absence from Rome he was not eligible to be a candidate for the election of the decemviri.

Cicero portrayed Publius Servilius Rullus as an insignificant figure and alleged that he was a front for unsavoury men he described as the real architects of the bill, as 'machinators' and as the men who had the real power and were to be feared more than Rullus. He claimed that they hoped to become decemviri. He did not name these men, but dropped hints which made them identifiable. He said that among those men who were after joining the commission there would be "some of them to whom nothing appears sufficient to possess, some to whom nothing seems sufficient to squander." The first was a reference to the popular image of Marcus Licinius Crassus and the second one referred to the popular image of Julius Caesar. The speeches of Cicero need to be understood in terms of the frictions between two political factions, the populares (in favour of the people) and the optimates (the good men). The former favoured the plebeians (the commoners), wanted to address the problems of the urban poor and promoted reforms which would help them, particularly the redistribution of land for the landless poor to farm and the problem of indebtedness. The latter was a conservative faction which favoured the wealthy equestrians and the senatorial aristocracy. It opposed the mentioned reforms. It also wanted to limit the power of the plebeian tribunes and the Plebeian Council (the assembly of the plebeians) and strengthen the power of the Senate. At that time Crassus and Caesar were leading figures of the populares. Cicero was a leading figure of the optimates and as such he was opposed to the bill.

Cicero exaggerated the power which the land commission would be given by the bill. He described the commission as "... ten Kings of the treasury, of the revenues, of all provinces, of the whole Republic, of the kingdoms allied with us, the free nations confederate with us - in fact, ten Lords of the world are to be set up under the pretence and name of an agrarian law." He also exaggerated the implications of the commission's power to sell domains outside Italy which had become public property. He claimed that "all nations, and people, and provinces, and kingdoms, are given up and handed over to the dominion, and judgment, and power of the decimviri … and asked … what place there is anywhere in the world which the decemviri may not be able to say has been made the property of the Roman people [public property]?" He also alleged that all the lands and cities in Asia which had been ‘recovered’ by Sulla and Pompey in Asia would be declared public property and sold by the commissioners. He said Lucius Cornelius Sulla (the commander in the First Mithridatic War, 89–85 BC) had recovered land in Asia. However, Sulla had fought and recovered territories only in Greece. There was no land which was Roman public property or could be declared as such in Greece. He said that Pompey also recovered land in Asia. After winning the Third Mithridatic War Pompey annexed Cilicia Trachea, part of Pontus (both in today's Turkey), and Syria. However, these were annexations, rather than recoveries of territories. Moreover, at the time of the bill the war was still on and Pompey's settlements in Asia were yet to be completed. Sumner points out that by mos maiorum the adjudication and control of the estates in the acquired territories were to rest with Pompey. Hence, here Cicero's statements were contentious and part of effort to purport that Crassus and Caesar wanted to use the bill to prepare for a conflict with Pompey (see below).

== Interpretations ==
There are various interpretations of the political motivations of this agrarian bill among various historians. 1) The most common one is that Crassus and Caesar sought to seize power through a coup d’ état against Pompey and/or the senate or that they were after command in Egypt to enable them to fight Pompey. 2) Crassus wanted to control the allotment of land so that he would have a strong bargaining position when Pompey came back from the war and sought land for his veterans (soldiers were entitled to a grant of a plot of land on their discharge); 3) The bill was a bribery scheme to provide profits for the merchants and a new tax source for the publicani (these were private tax collectors, the republican state tendered this collection to private tax collectors who used their position to line their pockets and for extortion); 4) The bill was never meant to be passed and served to show up Cicero in his true colours, as an optimate-lover, rather than consul in favour of the people and to heighten the conflict between the plebeians and the senate. 5) The purpose of the bill was genuinely to give land to the landless poor. According to this view, this was intended to rid Rome of these people who were seen as idle and dangerous and improve the security of the city. Conspiracy theories are unlikely and based on the rhetoric of Cicero and on the remarks of Plutarch and Suetonius. These two later writers had pro-aristocracy views and always portrayed the plebeian tribunes in a negative light. As for Cicero's speeches, their rhetoric appears to be designed to undermine support for the bill.

Cicero tried to give a conspiratorial hue to the bill. He alleged that the architects of the bill were against both Pompey and himself. He said that they hoped to use the powers of the commissioners to allot land to discharged soldiers to take away from Pompey his right to give his veterans land and, through this, the support of his veterans. He added that he was concerned that they would do so during his term as consul to undermine him because they despised him. This is what interpretations 2 and 4 rest on. Cicero repeatedly made his claim about an anti-Pompeian agenda. He said that the commissions would "in the first place take care that Gnaeus [Pompey] should be removed from all power of protecting your [the people's] liberty, from all power to promote, from all commission to watch over, and from all means of protecting your interests [,]" and that they thought it "expedient to oppose Gnaeus [Pompey] as your defence against all defects and wickednesses in the law." He called the commissioners "Ten general against Pompey." Cicero was also at pain to present himself as a consul who stood for the people and not for the aristocrats or the optimantes: "I have been made consul, not by the zeal of the powerful citizens, nor by the preponderating influence of a few men, but by the deliberate judgment of the Roman people, and that, too, in such a way as to be preferred to men of the very highest rank, to avoid, both in this magistracy and throughout my whole life, devoting myself to the interests of the people." He presented himself as a man who stood in opposition against men who pretended to stand in the interests of the people but were in fact a danger to the people (this was a reference to the populares): "For there is a great error abroad, by reason of the treacherous pretences made by some people, who, though they oppose and hinder not only the advantage but even the safety of the people, still endeavour by their speeches to make men believe them zealous for the interests of the people."

To further bolster his speeches, Cicero claimed that the Publius Rullus would sell Alexandria and Egypt. In 65 BC there was a proposal to annex Egypt. This was made by the plebeian tribunes. According to Suetonius Julius Caesar, who wanted to get the command in Egypt, put them up to it. According to Plutarch, instead, Crassus promoted this. Both Plutarch and Suetonius wrote over 160 years after these events. The proposal was made on the basis of a claim that Ptolemy Alexander I of Egypt bequeathed his kingdom to Rome. Cicero said: "I know that there is a resolution of the senate extant to the effect that it accepted the inheritance … [Publius Servilius Rullus] will also, in accordance with his own law, sell Alexandria, and sell Egypt. He will be found to be the judge, the arbiter, the master, of a most wealthy city, and of a most beautiful country; yes, he will be found to be the king of a most opulent kingdom. Will he abstain from taking all this? from desiring all this? He will decide that Alexandria belongs to the king; he will by his sentence deprive the Roman people of it." In the last part of the sentence Cicero implied that, should Egypt be annexed, the plebeian tribune and the other decemviri would use the sale of Alexandria and Egypt for their own profit.

Sumner points out that the proposal to annex Egypt by some plebeian tribunes in 65 BC had been rejected and that the commission would have to have the annexation approved by the senate or the assembly of the people. The bill did leave the possibility of annexation open by setting the cut off for the selling of domains outside Italy which had been seen as public property form 88 BC onward. This was the year in which Ptolemy Alexander I was deposed. However, not only the annexation would have to be approved by either of the mentioned bodies, so would the declaration of the royal property in Egypt as Roman public property. Thus, as Sumner notes, the bill did not allow the land commission 'to go and grab Egypt'. One this could add to this that the law did not allow the land commission to make a declaration on public land. The annexation of Egypt was a very unlikely scenario. Even in such a case, Sumner points out that the most likely Roman commander who would have benefited would have been Pompey, who was already in the east and was ending the war there. He would have been the best positioned man to handle the annexation of Egypt. Moreover, the 65 BC proposal to annex Egypt occurred during the period of ascendancy of Pompey and followed the Gabinian Law (67 BC), which gave Pompey extraordinary proconsular powers in any province within 50 miles of the Mediterranean Sea to deal with the problem of piracy, and the 66 BC Manilian Law (which Cicero had supported), which gave Pompey the mandate to replace the previous Romans commander in the Third Mithridatic War and gave him supreme command in the last phase of this war. Sumner also notes that the opponents to these two laws were optimates and that Julius Caesar had supported them. The planned coup d' état interpretation of the political motivations behind the bill is based on the idea that Caesar was after the command of Egypt after its annexation.

== Fate of the bill ==
The bill did not pass the vote. Cicero opposed subsequent proposals for agrarian laws to redistribute land. In 59 BC Julius Caesar managed to pass a law which gave land to 20,000 Roman citizens with more than three children in Campania, in the same area which had been earmarked for redistribution by the bill of Publius Servilius Rullus. Caesar managed to do so thanks to the enormous political power of the First Triumvirate, the informal political alliance Caesar made with Crassus and Pompey.

== See also ==
- Servilia (gens)
