= Publius Sempronius Tuditanus =

Roman general and statesman, consul in 204 BCE

Publius Sempronius C.f. Tuditanus (fl. 3rd century BC) was a Roman Republican consul and censor, best known for leading about 600 men to safety at Cannae in August, 216 BC and for the Treaty of Phoenice which ended the First Macedonian War, in 205 BC.

== Tuditanus at Cannae ==
The consul Lucius Aemilius Paullus (who died at Cannae) had left a reserve camp of about 10,000 men on the other bank. These men who did not participate in the battle had three choices after the disastrous battle: surrender to Hannibal, attempt to break through the Carthaginian lines and escape, or stand their ground and die fighting. The smaller of the two camps was besieged by the Carthaginians.

One of the few Roman officers who survived that fatal day, Publius Sempronius C.f. Tuditanus, along with his fellow tribune Gaius Octavius, advised that the men put on their shields, form a shield-wall, and break out through the lines of the exhausted Carthaginian army. Very few men agreed to go with him, the rest deciding to surrender to Hannibal and trusting that they would be ransomed by the Senate. The 600 men led by Tuditanus cut their way out to reach the larger camp, and from thence marched to Canusium, where they obtained safe refuge. Tuditanus's reputation was thus made with the Senate and the people of Rome. (The Senate refused to ransom those who had surrendered to Hannibal or been captured alive on the field of battle, with a senior senator Titus Manlius Torquatus citing the example of Tuditanus and his group, compared to the cowardly men who had not dared to break out).

This episode recorded by Livy goes back via Lucius Coelius Antipater to the Roman poet Ennius, but it is not told by Polybius, who retells in the completely preserved third book of his historical work a reliable and detailed report of the events of the Second Punic War in the years 219 to 216 BC. Therefore there are doubts about the historicity of this episode.

== Tuditanus in politics ==
Two years afterwards (214 BC) Tuditanus was elected curule aedile, and in the next year (213 BC) he was chosen praetor, with Ariminum as his province. He allegedly took the town of Atrinum, and was kept in the same command for the two following years (212 and 211 BC). Again there are serious doubts about the historicity of these recounted deeds of Tuditanus as praetor.

He was elected censor in 209 BC with Marcus Cornelius Cethegus, although neither he nor his colleague had yet held the consulship. These two young censors managed to complete the first lustrum (ritual cleansing) of the Roman state since the start of the Second Punic War. Other lustra had been interrupted by the death of at least one censor (sometimes in battle).

It was Tuditanus who had the right of choosing the new Princeps Senatus; Cethegus wanted the most senior censor, namely Titus Manlius Torquatus, to be chosen since he had been censor in 231 BC. However, Tuditanus preferred Quintus Fabius Maximus Verrucosus, the "Delayer", who had been elected censor in 230 BC, and was thus "junior", to be Princeps Senatus since he was the most meritorious of the senior senators. Since Tuditanus had the right to choose, his decision prevailed. His precedent allowed Rome to break with the tradition of choosing the most senior ex-censor as Princeps Senatus; from now on, the man determined to be the most distinguished senator would be chosen, which allowed the young Scipio Africanus to become Princeps Senatus in the year of his censorship.

In 205 BC, he was sent into Greece with the title of proconsul at the head of a military and naval force, for the purpose of opposing Philip V of Macedon. Instead, he concluded a preliminary treaty with Philip, the "Treaty of Phoenice", which was readily ratified by the Romans, who were anxious to give their undivided attention to the war in Africa.

In 204 BC, Tuditanus was elected consul in his absence, again with his former co-censor Cethegus. It is not known how well the men worked together again, although Livy does not mention any unseemly fracas. Tuditanus received Bruttium as his province during the conduct of the war against Hannibal and conquered Clampetia in 204. In the neighbourhood of Croton Tuditanus experienced a repulse, with a loss of 1,200 men, but shortly afterwards he gained a decisive victory over Hannibal, who was obliged in consequence to shut himself up within the walls of Croton. It was in this battle that Tuditanus vowed to build a temple to Fortuna Primigenia on the Quirinal, if he should succeed in routing the enemy. He consecrated this temple twenty years later (184 BC).

In 200 BC, Tuditanus was one of the three ambassadors sent to Greece and to Ptolemy V, king of Egypt. He is not subsequently mentioned by Livy.

== Family ==
Tuditanus, descended from a prominent branch of the plebeian gens Sempronia, may have been a nephew or cousin of the censor Marcus Sempronius Tuditanus who had been consul in 240 BC with Gaius Claudius Centho and censor in 230 BC with Quintus Fabius Maximus Verrucosus). His own father's name was Gaius according to lists of Roman consuls.

It is not clear how he is related to the other two or three prominent Tuditani:

- M. Sempronius Tuditanus, one of the officers of Scipio at the capture of New Carthage in Spain. (Livy xxvi. 48.). Possibly the same man as the consul 185 BC
- C. Sempronius Tuditanus, plebeian aedile 198 BC and praetor 197 BC, when he obtained Nearer Spain as his province. He was defeated by the Spaniards with great loss, and died shortly afterwards in consequence of a wound which he had received in the battle. He was pontifex at the time of his death.
- M. Sempronius M.f. C.n. Tuditanus (d. 174 BC Rome), tribune of the plebs 193 BC, proposed and carried a plebiscitum, which enacted that the law about money lent should be the same for the Socii and the Latini as for the Roman citizens. He was praetor 189 BC, when he obtained Sicily as his province, and consul 185 BC with Ap. Claudius Pulcher. In his consulship he carried on war, in Liguria, and defeated the Apuani, while his colleague was equally successful against the Ingauni. Tuditanus was an unsuccessful candidate for the consulship in 184 BC (won by Cato and Flaccus), but was elected one of the pontifices in the following year. He was carried off by the great pestilence which devastated Rome

The Sempronia, who was mother of Decimus Junius Brutus Albinus (one of Caesar's generals and assassins), may have been descended from any one of these men.

== See also ==
- Sempronia gens
- List of Roman Republican consuls
- List of Roman censors

== Sources ==
- Livy. History of Rome.

Political offices
Preceded by Publius Cornelius Scipio Africanus, and Publius Licinius Crassus Dives	Consul of the Roman Republic; 204 BC with Marcus Cornelius Cethegus	Succeeded by Gnaeus Servilius Caepio, and Gaius Servilius Geminus
