= Gaius Servilius Geminus (praetor before 218 BC) =

3rd century BC Roman senator and prisoner of war

Gaius Servilius Geminus (fl. 218–203 BC) was a Roman senator. After holding the office of praetor, he in 218 BC was the member of a triumviral commission for the creation of the colonies of Placentia (Piacenza) and Cremona in Cisalpine Gaul. The Second Punic War against Carthage had just broken out, and the commissioners were surprised by an uprising of the Gallic Boii and Insubres, caused by news that the Carthaginian general Hannibal was approaching. Servilius and the others took refuge at Mutina, but were lured out and captured. For many years they were presumed dead, but Servilius survived and remained a prisoner, alongside his colleague Gaius Lutatius Catulus (consul in 220 BC), for the next 15 years. They were released and returned to Rome in 203 BC by Servilius's son of the same name, who was consul that year.

Although Gaius Servilius's father, Publius Servilius Geminus (consul in 252 BC), was a patrician, his two sons, Gaius Servilius (consul in 203) and Marcus Servilius Pulex Geminus (consul in 202), were plebeians. It is unclear whether it was the elder Gaius or his sons who made the transition.
