= Marcus Servilius Pulex Geminus =

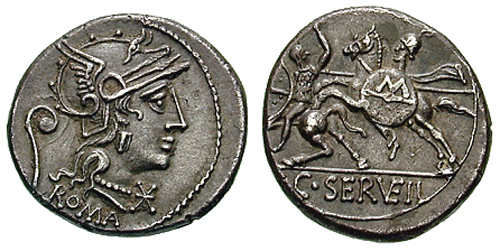
Denarius of Gaius Servilius Vatia, 127 BC. The obverse depicts a head of Roma; the lituus behind her head refers to Pulex Geminus' augurate in 211 BC. The reverse depicts Marcus Servilius Pulex Geminus, identified by the 'M' on his shield.

Marcus Servilius Pulex Geminus was a Roman statesman during the Second Punic War, and the early decades of the second century BC. He was a renowned warrior, whose martial prowess was commemorated on coins issued by several of his descendants.

== Background ==
Servilius was the younger son of Gaius Servilius Geminus, praetor about 220 BC, and grandson of Publius Servilius Geminus, consul in 252. The Servilii Gemini were a branch of an old and distinguished patrician family, but either Gaius or his sons went over to the plebeians, for reasons that are not entirely clear. Servilius' elder brother, Gaius, was tribune of the plebs in 211 BC, consul in 203, and dictator in 202. Servilius' additional surname, Pulex, refers to a flea, but the circumstances of this cognomen are not mentioned in any source.

== Career ==
Servilius was augur in 211 BC, curule aedile in 204, magister equitum in 203, and consul in 202. During his consulship, he was assigned to Etruria with two legions; in 201 his imperium was prorogued, and he remained in Etruria as proconsul.

In 167 BC, during the debate whether to grant a triumph to Lucius Aemilius Paullus, Geminus addressed the people in favor of Paullus, showing his multiple scars earned in battle in order to impress the crowd. Indeed, Servilius was especially known for his dueling abilities, as he allegedly defeated twenty-three enemies in single combat. Five of his descendants who served as triumviri monetales depicted him on their coins.

== Legacy ==
Servilius was probably the father of Marcus Servilius, one of the military tribunes in 181 BC, who was appointed pontifex in 170. The Vatiae, a plebeian family of the Servilii, including several of the moneyers whose coins depict Marcus Servilius Pulex Geminus, are thought to be descended through this line.

== Gallery ==
The duels of Marcus Servilius Pulex Geminus

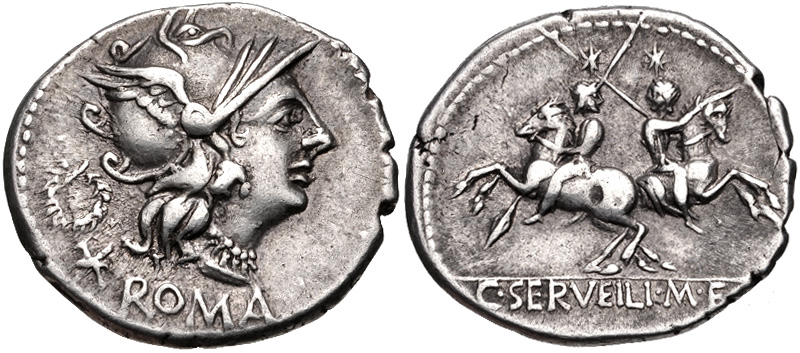
Denarius of Gaius Servilius, 136 BC. Roma is depicted on the obverse with a wreath behind, while the reverse shows Pulex Geminus facing a foe, under the traits of the Dioscuri.

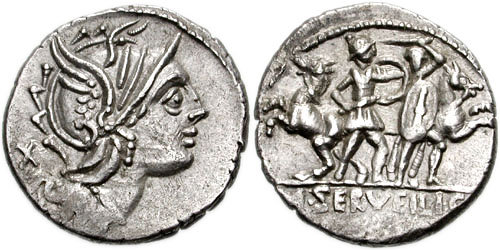
Denarius of Marcus Servilius, circa 100 BC. On the obverse is Roma. The reverse shows the duellists on foot, with their horses in the background.

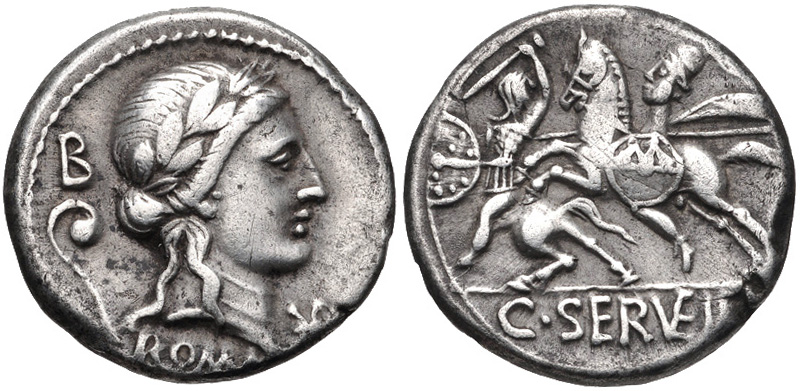
Denarius of Gaius Servilius Vatia, 82-80 BC. Apollo is depicted on the obverse with a lituus behind, while the reverse reuses that of his possible father, the moneyer of 127 (whose coin is pictured above).

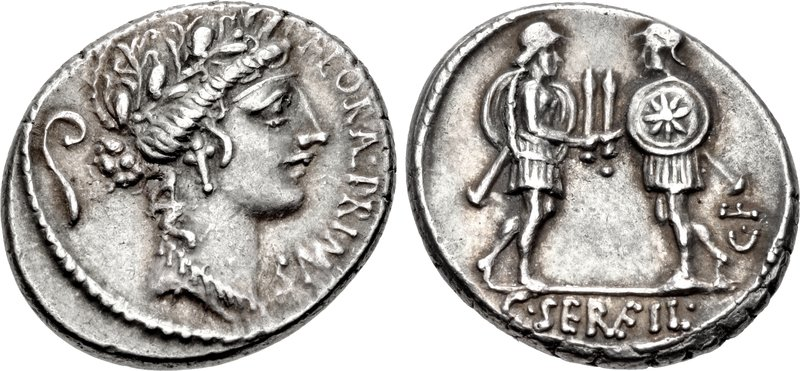
Denarius of Gaius Servilius, 53 BC. The obverse features the head of Flora with a lituus behind, the reverse the duellists facing each other and presenting swords. The emblem on the shield of the right soldier could be the Vergina Sun, thus alluding to an event of the Macedonian Wars.

== Bibliography ==
- Titus Livius (Livy), History of Rome.
- Lucius Mestrius Plutarchus (Plutarch), Lives of the Noble Greeks and Romans.
- August Pauly, Georg Wissowa, et alii, Realencyclopädie der Classischen Altertumswissenschaft (Scientific Encyclopedia of the Knowledge of Classical Antiquities, abbreviated RE or PW), J. B. Metzler, Stuttgart (1894–1980).
- Michael Crawford, Roman Republican Coinage, Cambridge University Press (1974, 2001).

Political offices
| Preceded by Cn. Servilius Caepio; C. Servilius Geminus | Roman consul 202 BC; With: Tiberius Claudius Nero | Succeeded by Cn. Cornelius Lentulus; P. Aelius Paetus |
