= Scipio Africanus =

Roman general and politician (236/235 – c. 183 BC)

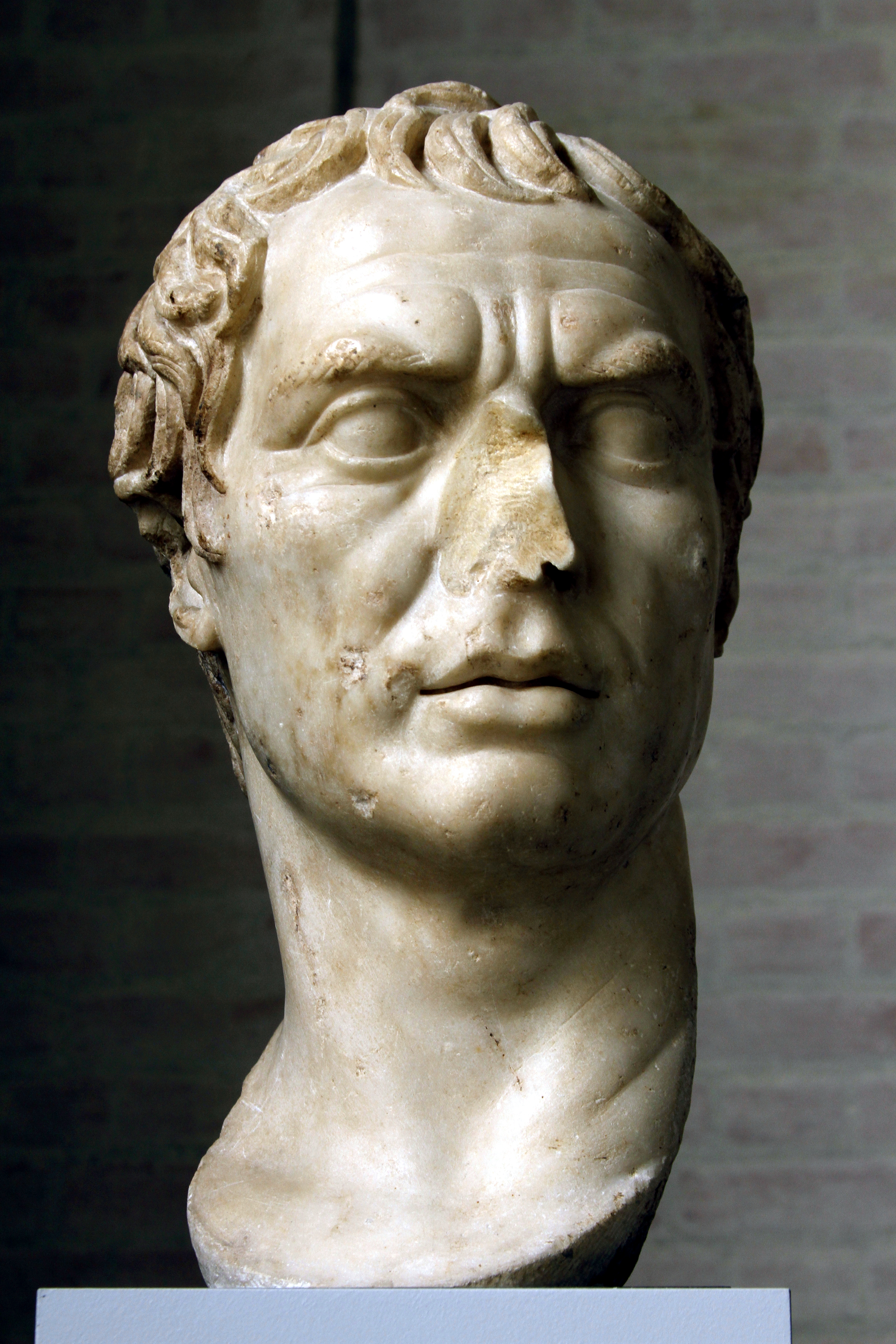
- Bust likely of Scipio Africanus (formerly identified as Sulla)
- Born: 236 or 235 BC; Rome
- Died: c. 183 BC; Liternum
- Known for: Defeating Hannibal
- Office: Proconsul (Spain, 216–210 BC); Consul (205 BC); Proconsul (Africa, 204–201 BC); Censor (199 BC); Consul (194 BC); Legate (Asia, 190 BC)
- Spouse: Aemilia Tertia
- Children: 4, including Cornelia
- Father: Publius Scipio
- Relatives: Scipio Asiaticus (brother); Scipio Aemilianus (adoptive grandson); Tiberius and Gaius Gracchus (grandsons); Cornelia (mother of the Gracchi) (daughter)

Military service
- Allegiance: Rome
- Branch/service: Roman army
- Battles/wars: Second Punic War; Battle of Ticinus; Battle of Victumulae; Battle of Cannae; Battle of New Carthage; Battle of Baecula; Battle of Ilipa; Siege of Utica; Battle of Utica; Battle of the Great Plains; Battle of Zama; Roman–Seleucid War; Battle of Magnesia

Publius Cornelius Scipio Africanus (/ˈs(k)ɪpi.oʊ/; Latin: [ˈskiːpioː]; 236/235–c. 183 BC) was a Roman general and statesman who was one of the main architects of Rome's victory against Carthage in the Second Punic War. Often regarded as one of the greatest military commanders and strategists of all time, his crowning achievement was the defeat of Hannibal at the Battle of Zama in 202 BC, which earned him the honorific epithet Africanus ("the African").

Born into a distinguished patrician family in Rome, Scipio followed his father Publius Scipio to war against Carthage, and survived the disastrous Roman defeat at Cannae. In 210 BC, despite never having held consular office, he was elected to take command of Rome's forces in Hispania, following the death of his father and uncle in battle. His campaign culminated in the victory at Ilipa in 206 BC against Hannibal's brother Mago Barca, leading to the Roman conquest of Carthaginian Iberia. Elected consul in 205 BC, Scipio launched an invasion of the Carthaginian homeland in Africa, compelling the Carthaginians to recall Hannibal. Following failed negotiations, Scipio routed Hannibal's army at Zama, forcing Carthage to sue for peace and bringing to an end the Second Punic War.

Despite his triumphs and heroic status among the Roman public, Scipio had many political opponents, in particular Cato the Elder. In 187 BC, Scipio and his brother Lucius were subjected to trials for bribes they supposedly received from the Seleucid king Antiochus III during the Roman–Seleucid War. Disillusioned, he left Rome and retired to his villa in Liternum, where he died circa 183 BC.

== Early years ==
=== Family ===
Scipio Africanus was born as Publius Cornelius Scipio in 236 BC to his then-homonymous father and Pomponia into the family of the Cornelii Scipiones. His family was one of the major still-extant patrician families and had held multiple consulships within living memory: his great-grandfather Lucius Cornelius Scipio Barbatus and grandfather Lucius Cornelius Scipio were both consuls and censors. His mother's brothers Manius Pomponius Matho and Marcus Pomponius Matho were consuls in 233 and 231 respectively, his father's brother Gnaeus Cornelius Scipio Calvus was consul in 222, and his father was in 218.

=== Early military service ===
The Second Punic War started in early 218 BC when the Roman ultimatum to Carthage demanding that Hannibal withdraw from Saguntum in Spain was rejected. Scipio's father was consul that year and the younger Scipio joined him in the campaign to stop Hannibal's march on Italy. In a short cavalry engagement between Scipio's father and Hannibal at the river Ticinus near modern Pavia, Polybius claims that the son saved his father's life after the father was encircled by enemy horsemen. Other sources credit an unnamed Ligurian slave.

Two years later, in 216 BC, Scipio served as military tribune. He survived the disastrous Battle of Cannae – his father-in-law, the consul Lucius Aemilius Paullus, was slain there. – and, after the battle, rallied survivors at Canusium. According to Livy, when he heard that Lucius Caecilius Metellus and other young nobles were discussing a plan to abandon the republic and go overseas to serve as mercenaries, Scipio stormed into the meeting and forced all of them at sword-point to swear to Jupiter and the Capitoline triad that they would never abandon Rome. This story is probably a late invention, as it does not appear in Polybius.

The next year, in 213 BC, he was elected curule aedile and served with his cousin Marcus Cornelius Cethegus. His candidacy was opposed by one of the plebeian tribunes on the grounds that he had not yet reached the minimum age, but the voters expressed such enthusiastic support for Scipio that the tribune desisted.

== Second Punic War ==
=== Campaign in Hispania ===
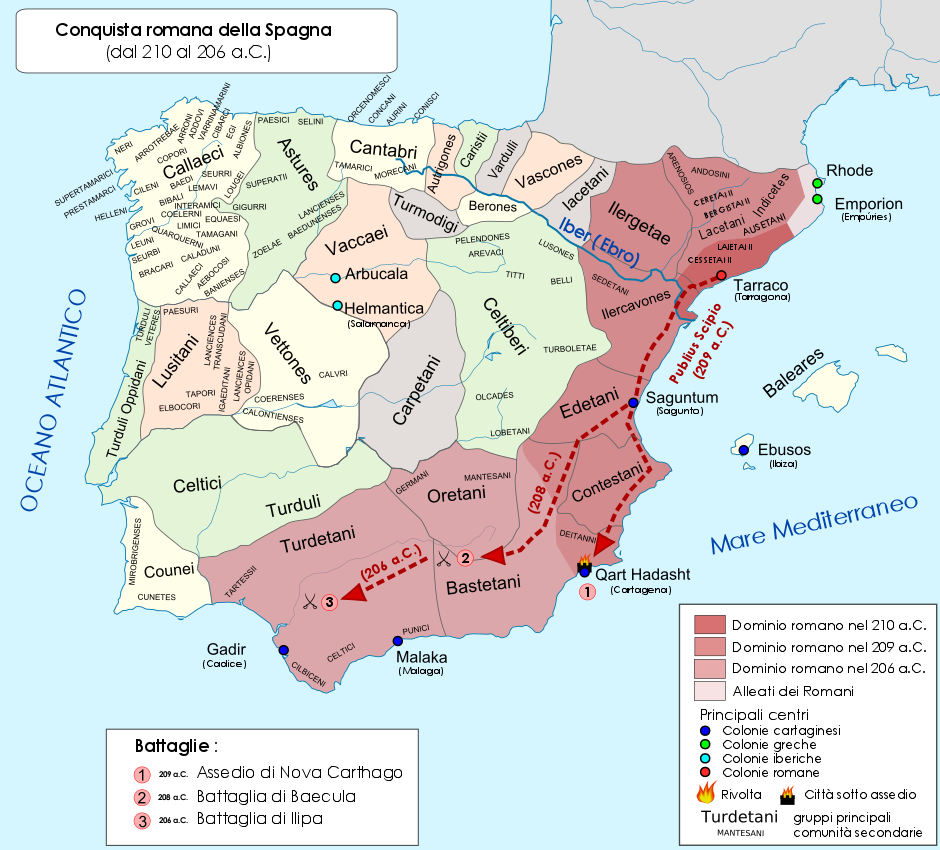
Roman campaigning from 210 to 206 BC in Hispania

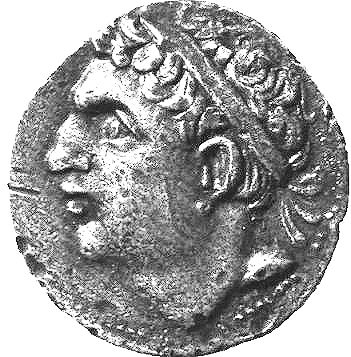
A Carthaginian coin depicting Hasdrubal Barca (245–207 BC), one of Hannibal's younger brothers, wearing a diadem

From the start of the war through to 211 BC, Scipio's father, Publius Cornelius Scipio, and uncle – Gnaeus Cornelius Scipio Calvus – were in command of Rome's armies in Spain. They made some headway when the Carthaginians were forced to withdraw a considerable portion of their forces to handle a revolt by Syphax of Numidia. Through the seven years from 218, the brothers had successfully extended Roman control deep into Carthaginian territory. However, disaster struck in 211 BC when the brothers divided their forces to attack three separate Carthaginian armies and were defeated in detail. The brothers fell in separate battles against the Carthaginians, who were led by Hasdrubal Barca, Mago Barca, and Hasdrubal Gisco; the two Barcas were Hannibal's brothers.

Initially, Gaius Claudius Nero – who was praetor in 212 BC – was sent to contain the situation. But in 210 BC, the assembly elected Scipio to take command. Modern scholars dismiss the Livian narrative of senatorial indecision and have instead suggested that the senate chose Scipio but forced a popular vote to legitimise an irregular command. Giving Scipio command was an extraordinary act, as he at this point had never held a praetorship or consulship, but was regardless granted imperium pro consule, taking command on his arrival to Spain in the early autumn. He was the first person to have been given proconsular imperium without having held consular office. He went to Spain with some 10,000 reinforcements and was joined by another commander, Marcus Junius Silanus, who was dispatched pro praetore and soon assumed command of Nero's army.

Seeking to defeat the three Carthaginian armies in detail, the next year, 209 BC, saw Scipio's first major campaign: he besieged Qart-Hadast (modern Cartagena), which was a major Carthaginian logistics hub and of substantial strategic importance. In the battle, he captured the city by sending a wading party across the lagoon to the city's north when it reached low tide, he told the troops that he had a vision in which the god Neptune had promised aid; this alleged vision played a role in the rapid development of a Scipionic legend around him and his family. Storming the city rapidly and with little ability to tell combatants and civilians apart, Scipio ordered his men to massacre all they encountered and pillage any structures; Polybius viewed the massacre as intended to terrorise the local population into rapidly surrendering and included an anecdote of Romans being so thorough as to cut even the dogs and other animals in half. He then forced the surrender of Mago in the citadel and rapidly switched his tune, sparing the remaining citizens and only enslaving the town's non-citizens. He then took the three hundred Spanish hostages into his custody, giving them gifts, guaranteeing their safety and that of their families, and promising them freedom if their respective communities would ally with Rome.

After the battle, several Spanish tribes defected to the Romans. The next year, 208 BC, Scipio fought Hasdrubal north of the river Baetis, near Baecula. While Scipio was victorious, the battle was indecisive and Hasdrubal escaped north with most of his army across the Pyrenees for Italy; Hasdrubal and his army reached Italy in 207, where they were eventually defeated in the Battle of the Metaurus with the army destroyed and Hasdrubal slain. The following year, Hasdrubal was replaced by a certain Hanno, who was captured by Junius Silanus in Celtiberia. Following the army under Hasdrubal, son of Gisgo, which retreated to Gades (modern Cádiz), Scipio's brother took Orongis (modern Jaén) before a decisive victory in 206 BC at the Battle of Ilipa, north of modern Seville, forced the Carthaginians to withdraw from the peninsula. In mopping-up operations, Scipio captured Ilourgeia and Castulo, inflicting severe punishment on the former for having killed refugees from his army. Other Roman commanders captured other towns in Spain, including Astapa, whose inhabitants committed mass suicide. After a quickly-suppressed revolt by Spanish tribes when false rumours of Scipio's death from illness spread, he crossed into Africa to solicit the support of Syphax and thence into western Hispania to meet Massinissa for the same purpose. Syphax pledged loyalty but eventually joined with the Carthaginians; Massinissa, however, joined with the Romans with a small contingent when Syphax expelled him the kingdom of Massylii. Meanwhile, Gades surrendered to the Romans.

Some time c. 206 BC, Scipio also founded the town of Italica (located about 9 km northwest of Seville), which later became the birthplace of the emperors, Trajan, Hadrian, and Theodosius I.

With a general victory across the peninsula, Scipio then returned to Rome to stand for the consulship of 205 BC, leaving Lucius Cornelius Lentulus and Lucius Manlius Acidinus in command. He returned to Rome late in the year; according to Livy he was denied a triumph, on the grounds that he was privatus – that is, sine magistratu – and had never been elected to a magistracy with imperium.

=== African campaign ===
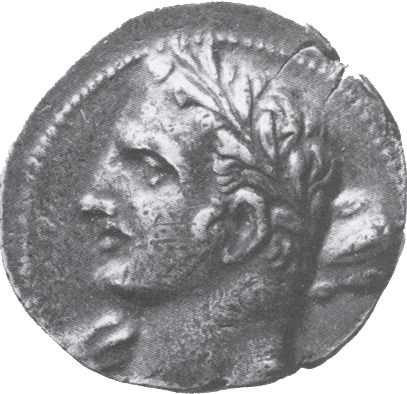
A Carthaginian coin possibly depicting Hannibal as Hercules (i.e. Heracles)

Scipio was elected unanimously to the consulship of 205 BC amid much enthusiasm; he was 31 and still technically too young to be consul. When he entered into office, he demanded that the senate assign him the province of Africa and threatened to take the matter to the popular assemblies if it refused to do so. Despite fierce opposition from the princeps senatus, Quintus Fabius Maximus Verrucosus, the senate bowed to his pressure and he received Sicily with permission to cross into Africa if he wished. Fabius' opposition may have been related to jealousy of Scipio's popularity, but also was likely informed by the failed African campaign c. 255 BC under Marcus Atilius Regulus during the First Punic War, which saw the Carthaginians' war efforts renewed. The senate, regardless, assigned Scipio no additional soldiers, leading him to recruit an army of volunteers; Livy reports that from his clients and supporters in Italy, he mustered some 30 warships and 7,000 men.

He spent most of his consulship preparing his troops in Sicily for the invasion of Africa. He captured Locri on the toe of Italy that year, and left one Pleminius in command there. After Pleminius assumed command, he robbed the city's temple and tortured and killed two military tribunes. For these crimes, the senate had Pleminius placed under arrest; Scipio was also implicated but was cleared the next year.

==== Invasion of Africa ====
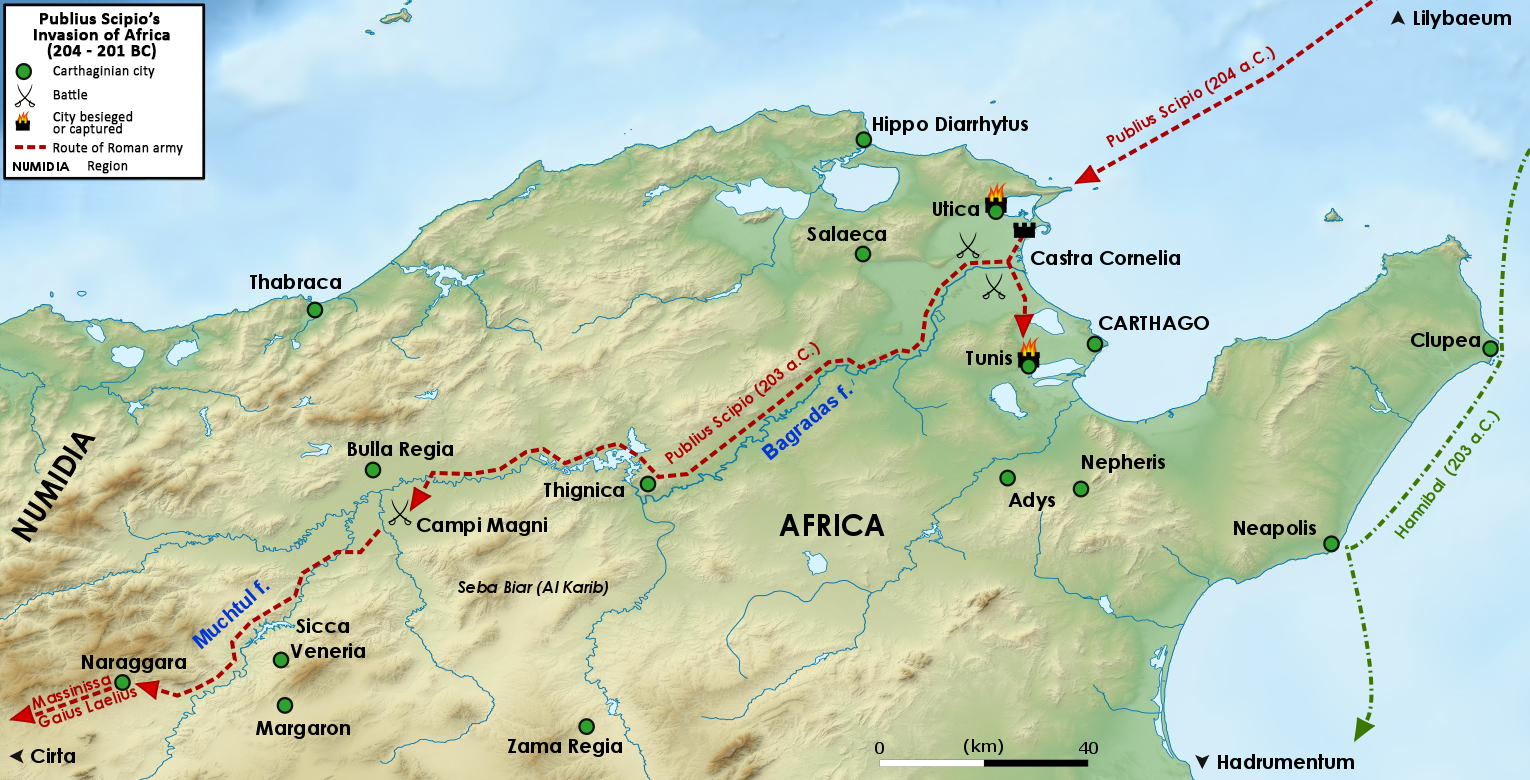
Scipio's military campaign in Africa 204–203 BC

His imperium was prorogued into 205 BC and in that year, he crossed with his men into Africa and besieged Utica before withdrawing and pretending in the winter to negotiate with the Carthaginians. During those pretended negotiations, Scipio mapped out the enemy camps and launched a night attack that was successful in destroying them and killing a large number of the enemy. The armies then fought in the Battle of the Great Plains some time early in the new year (his imperium was prorogued until the war's completion) and after capturing Syphax of Numidia, restored Massinissa to the kingdom. The Carthaginians reacted to the defeat by recalling their generals Hannibal and Mago from Italy and launching their fleet against Scipio's to cut off their supply lines. Scipio was forced into a naval battle near Utica, but was able to avert disaster, losing only some sixty transport ships. Another set of peace negotiations occurred, with the Carthaginians eventually agreeing to abandon all territorial claims in the Mediterranean and beyond, limit her rights to expand in Africa, recognize Massinissa's kingdom, give up all but twenty of her ships, and pay a war indemnity. However, during the negotiations, the Carthaginians – suffering from starvation – attacked a Roman food convoy, leading to protests to be sent and envoys exchanged.

Amid further attempts to remove him from command – one of the consuls of 203 BC, Gnaeus Servilius Caepio, attempted to substitute himself for Scipio to claim credit for the final blow against Carthage; the consuls of 202 BC coveted the African command for the same reason – Scipio refused peace terms at a parley with Hannibal in 202 BC. With the support of Masinissa's Numidian cavalry, the Battle of Zama was fought shortly after; the Romans won and Carthage then again sued for peace.

In the new year, 201 BC, Scipio remained in Africa to conclude negotiations, which saw Carthage's territory kept to the status quo ante bellum, Carthage restore to the Romans all captured goods and persons, Carthaginian disarmament of all but ten triremes, and Carthage needing to ask for Roman permission to make any war. Massinissa's territory in Numidia was to be confirmed; and a war indemnity of 10,000 talents was to be paid over the next fifty years. Although the consul of 201 BC, Gnaeus Cornelius Lentulus attempted to oppose the peace so that he could continue the war in Scipio's place, the peace terms were ratified by the assembly in Rome, bringing the war to a final close.

==== Return ====
On his return, Scipio celebrated a triumph over Hannibal, the Carthaginians, and Syphax. There, he took the agnomen Africanus ('the African'), for his victories. By this point, Scipio's career reached far beyond his peers even though he was only in his early thirties. On his return, he deposited some 123,000 pounds of silver into the Roman treasury and distributed 400 asses each to his soldiers.

His popularity among the plebs was also astonishing – the Scipionic legend, which in later forms depicted him a son of Jupiter – and heralded great political success. This success, however, turned many Roman aristocrats into his enemies, largely to oppose his further aggrandisement or out of jealousy. Even during his consulship, he had been opposed by Fabius Maximus and others, especially after stories circulated of his being saluted as king and god in Spain. His intended role in Roman politics, however, remained traditional.

== Later life ==
=== Censorship and second consulship ===
In the year 199 BC, Scipio was elected censor with Publius Aelius Paetus as his colleague. Their censorship was largely unremarkable, but saw Scipio named as princeps senatus, a title which he retained for the next two lustra. After this point, the classicist Howard Hayes Scullard believed that Scipio's political position entered an eclipse. This is disputed.

After the required ten years between consulships had elapsed, Scipio secured election to the consulship of 194 BC. During his second consulship, he wanted to succeed Titus Quinctius Flamininus in Greece and advocated for a stronger Roman presence in the Aegean to guard against Antiochus III, but was unsuccessful. He instead fought the Boii and Ligurians in northern Italy, against whom the Romans had been continuously campaigning since 201 BC. Scipio let his co-consul, Tiberius Sempronius Longus, take the leading role in the fighting and returned to Rome to hold the consular elections.

In 193 BC, Scipio is said to have taken part in two embassies. The first was to Africa, where he was one of three sent to arbitrate a boundary dispute between Carthage and Masinissa: the commission left the matter undecided, possibly on purpose. The second embassy is said to have been to Asia and, on the basis of travel time, could not have happened. During the alleged embassy, Scipio is apocryphally said to have discussed the best generals with Hannibal at Ephesus.

=== War with Antiochus ===
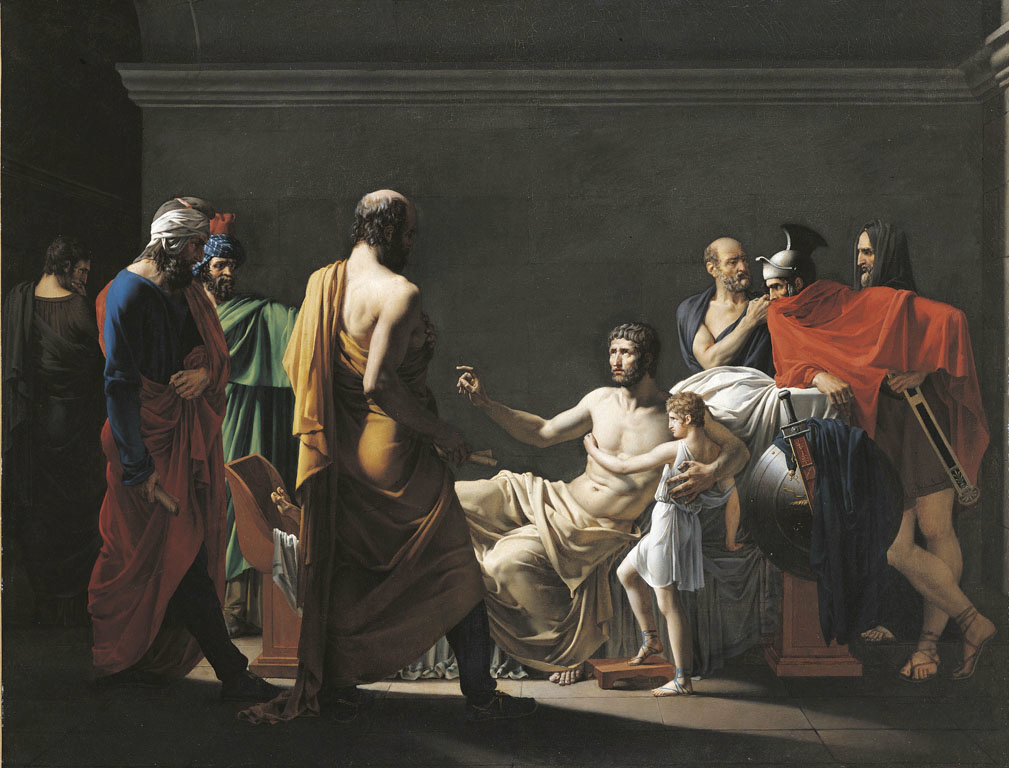
Antiochus sends his son to Scipio. Painting by Jean-Pierre Granger (c. 1800).

In 192 BC, Rome declared war on Antiochus, who – after a cold war with the Romans starting from the close of the Second Macedonian War through to 193 BC – had invaded Greece. Antiochus' initial push into Greece was met with little enthusiasm by the locals, who were well-treated in a peaceful and largely open interstate system in the aftermath of the Roman proclamation of Greek freedom. It did not help that the cities that he did take had to be taken by force. The consul of 191 BC, Manius Acilius Glabrio, arrived in the spring and promptly defeated Antiochus at the Battle of Thermopylae – Antiochus lost the battle and was forced back across the Aegean to Ephesus within six months of the war's start.

The consul of 190 BC was Scipio Africanus' brother, Lucius Cornelius Scipio, who was assigned by the senate to Greece with permission to cross into Asia. He appointed his older brother, Scipio Africanus, as one of his legates. While en route, Roman armies and fleets quickly overwhelmed Antiochus' defences, forcing him to retreat from the Hellespont and Abydos; by October 190 BC, when the Scipios arrived, the Romans had an army in Asia minor. Antiochus offered terms – a war indemnity to cover half the cost of the war and abandonment of his claims to Smyrna, Lampsacus, Alexandria Troas, and other towns – but the Scipiones rejected the offer based on the Roman war aim of reshaping to their benefit the Aegean balance of power. They responded by demanding Antiochus cede all territory to the Taurus mountains and pay an indemnity covering the entire cost of the war; the demands were so extreme he immediately broke off negotiations. Late in the year, around mid-December, Antiochus' forces engaged the Romans at Magnesia; even though they outnumbered the Romans and allies by at least two to one, Antiochus' army of some 60,000 men was routed.

Shortly before Magnesia, Antiochus offered Scipio Africanus a bribe to secure favourable peace terms, which Africanus rejected. At the battle itself, he claimed illness, but was selected to present the Roman peace terms regardless. The credit for the victory accrued to his brother and commander, Lucius. The peace terms presented at Sardis were largely the Roman demands prior to the battle: Antiochus would cede all territory outside the Taurus line (eventually determined to be from Cape Sarpedon in Cilicia through to the river Tanais), pay a war indemnity of 15,000 talents to Rome with a separate 400 talents to Eumenes, all exiles and enemies of Rome would be handed over (including Hannibal) along with twenty hostages (including Antiochus' youngest son).

=== Trials of the Scipios ===
The 190s BC saw a re-emergence of attempts by the aristocratic elite to put limits on individual ambitions. The return of the Scipiones to Rome saw claims over Lucius Scipio's triumph disputed: critics thought the Scipiones had been fighting a weak enemy and that the war had actually truly been won a year earlier at Thermopylae. His triumph, however, was approved regardless. Lucius' attempt to secure from the senate a prorogation to oversee the settlement of Asia also was rejected; no exception would be made to the general post-Hannibalic war rule against promagistrates. Lucius Scipio adopted the cognomen Asiagenes and at his triumph brought some 137,420 pounds of silver, 224,000 tetradrachms, 140,000 gold coins, 234 gold crowns, 1231 ivory tusks, and more into the city. His soldiers were granted bonuses of 25 denarii each, with more to officers and cavalry.

These enormous amounts of plunder triggered moral panic at Rome about the possible diversion of those funds to extravagant private use. These troubles related to the broader matter of charting the boundaries of power that magistrates could exercise abroad, especially in relation of monies obtained in war. A confusing mess of stories related to the Scipiones' legal troubles are recorded in the ancient sources.

Scipio Asiagenes was in fact indicted. He was not alone, his successor in Asia – Gnaeus Manlius Vulso – also was brought up on charges. Regardless, the trial forced a full accounting of cash paid by Antiochus to Manlius and Asiagenes. After Asiagenes was fined – either by a special court or by tribunician legislation – he refused to pay the fine, claiming poverty, and was only saved from prison when one of the plebeian tribunes, usually identified as Tiberius Sempronius Gracchus, interceded.

Africanus was around the same time challenged in the senate. A senator demanded that he produce his account-books for the Antiochene campaign and account for the monies allotted to pay his troops. He responded with indignation and declared that he owed no reckoning. Securing the account-books from his brother, he waved them before the senators and then tore them up, asking the rhetorical question as to how the senate could be concerned with a mere 3,000 talents when he had brought 15,000 into the treasury by conquering Spain, Africa, and Asia.

One story, given by Valerius Antias, indicates that one of the tribunes at the urging of Cato the Elder brought charges against Scipio Africanus alleging bribery and theft. Antias then has Scipio respond with a rousing oration detailing his services to the republic and noting that the day is the anniversary of the Battle of Zama. At this notice, he then leads an impromptu procession to sacrifice at the Temple of Jupiter Optimus Maximus amid thunderous applause, leaving the prosecutors embarrassed. This story, however, "generates little confidence".

The legal troubles proved little trouble for the Scipiones, as evidence by Asiagenes' lavish games in 186 and vigorous campaign for the censorship of 184 (he was unsuccessful). Friends of the Scipiones continued to win consular elections. Scipio himself retired to Liternum; "the idea that he retired in semi-exile or ignominy is pure romance".

=== Death ===
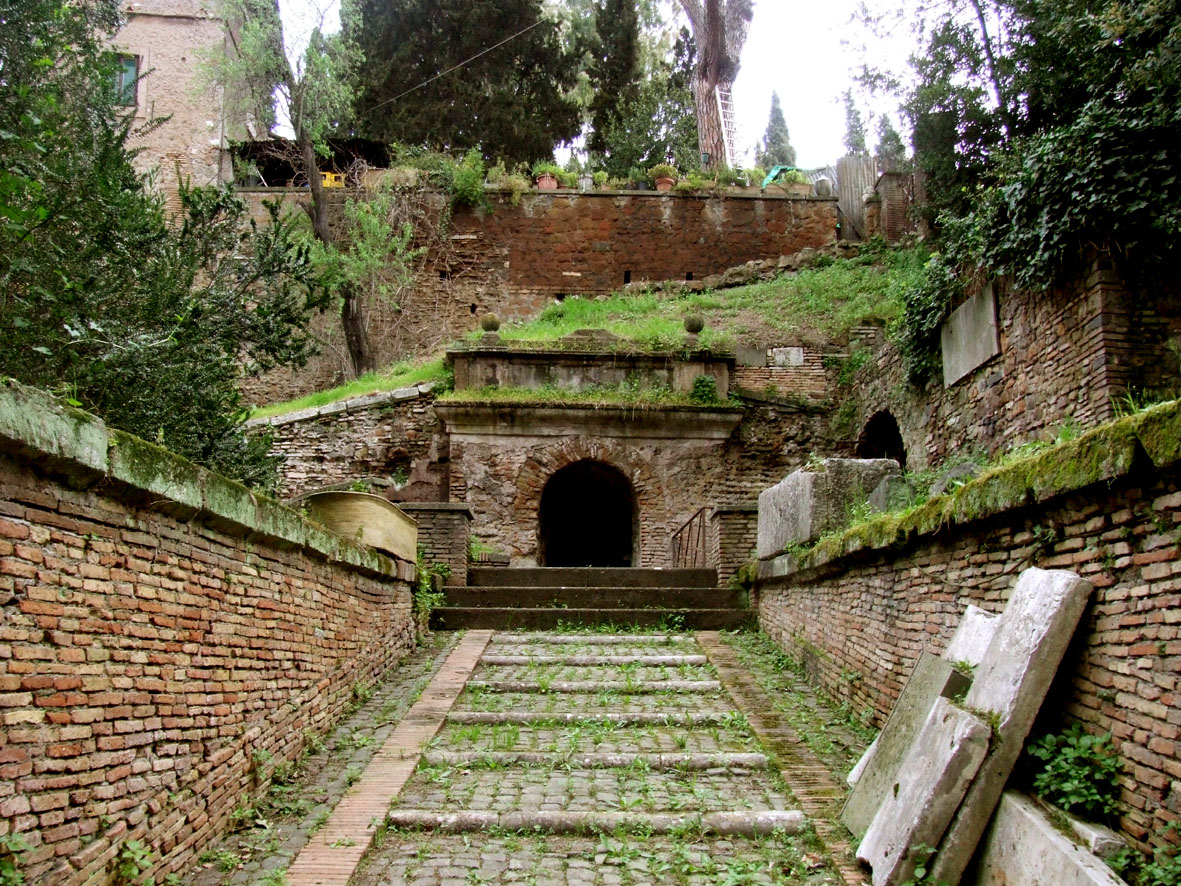
The entrance to the Tomb of the Scipios

Scipio retired to his country seat at Liternum on the coast of Campania, where he died. There are multiple dates reported for his death. Polybius and Rutilius, who both lived shortly after his death, report that he died in 183 BC; the later historian Valerius Antias reported that he died in 187 BC. Livy, arguing against both dates in his history, believed Scipio died c. 185 BC, rejecting both dates with the argument that if Scipio lived to 183 he would be noted as princeps senatus and that Scipio had to have lived to 185 BC to have been prosecuted by the Naevius who was tribune in that year. However, most modern sources, such as the Oxford Classical Dictionary, prefer 183 BC.

It is not clear where Scipio Africanus was buried. There are three main possibilities. The first is the Tomb of the Scipios in Rome. Nothing survives in the literary record documenting his burial there, however. The second is his villa at Liternum: it was later owned by Seneca the Younger, who in a letter expressed his belief that an altar there was Africanus' tomb. The third is the pyramidal Meta Romuli which was ahistorically dubbed the Sepulcrum Scipionis during the Renaissance.

== Marriage and issue ==
Scipio married Aemilia Tertia, daughter of the consul Lucius Aemilius Paullus who fell at Cannae. She was also the sister of another consul, Lucius Aemilius Paullus Macedonicus. Scipio's marriage was fruitful.

They had three sons:

- Gnaeus Cornelius Scipio, who became praetor in 177 BC;
- Lucius Cornelius Scipio, who became praetor in 174 BC; and
- Publius Cornelius Scipio, who was inducted into the augurate in 180 BC.

They also had two daughters. Both were named Cornelia. The elder married Publius Cornelius Scipio Nasica Corculum. The younger Cornelia married Tiberius Sempronius Gracchus and became mother to the Gracchi brothers, Tiberius Gracchus and Gaius Gracchus.

His son Publius had a son who died before achieving any political office. This son later adopted the son of Lucius Aemilius Paullus Macedonicus, who became known as Scipio Aemilianus. Scipio's only descendants living through the late Republican period were the descendants of his two daughters. His younger daughter's last surviving child Sempronia, wife and then widow of Scipio Aemilianus – his adoptive grandson – was alive as late as 102 BC.

== Personality and traits ==
=== Roman opinions of Scipio ===
Scipio was a man of great intellect and culture who could speak and read Greek, wrote his own memoirs in Greek and became also noted for his introduction of the clean shaven face fashion among the Romans according to the example of Alexander the Great instead of wearing the beard. This man's fashion lasted until the time of emperor Hadrian (r. 117–138), then was revived by Constantine the Great (r. 306–337) and lasted until the reign of emperor Phocas (r. 602–610) who again introduced the wearing of the beard among Roman emperors. He also enjoyed the reputation of being a graceful orator, the secret of his sway being his deep self-confidence and radiant sense of fairness.

To his political opponents, he was often harsh and arrogant, but towards others singularly gracious and sympathetic. His Hellenophile lifestyle, and his unconventional way of wearing the Roman toga, raised much opposition among some Senators of Rome, led by Cato the Elder who felt that Greek influence was destroying Roman culture. Cato, as a loyalist of Fabius Maximus, had been sent out as quaestor to Scipio in Sicily circa 204 BC to investigate charges of military indiscipline, corruption, and other offence against Scipio; none of those charges was found true by the tribunes of the plebs accompanying Cato (it may or may not be significant that years later, as censor, Cato degraded Scipio's brother Scipio Asiaticus from the Senate. It is certainly true that some Romans of the day viewed Cato as a representative of the old Romans, and Scipio and his like as Hellenophiles).

He often visited the temple of Jupiter and made offerings there. There was a belief that he was a special favourite of heaven and actually communicated with the gods. It is quite possible that he himself honestly shared this belief. However, the strength of this belief is evident, even a generation later when his adopted grandson, Publius Aemilianus Scipio, was elected to the consulship from the office of tribune. His rise was spectacular and letters survive from soldiers under his command in Hispania show that they believed that he possessed the same abilities as his grandfather.

The elder Scipio was a spiritual man as well as a soldier and statesman, and was a priest of Mars. The ability which he is supposed to have possessed is called by the old name, "second sight", and he is supposed to have had prescient dreams in which he saw the future. Livy describes this belief as it was perceived then, without offering his opinion as to its veracity. Polybius made a case that Scipio's successes resulted from good planning, rational thinking and intelligence, which he said was a higher sign of the gods' favour than prophetic dreams. Polybius suggested that people had only said that Scipio had supernatural powers because they had not appreciated the natural mental gifts which facilitated Scipio's achievements.

=== The continence of Scipio ===
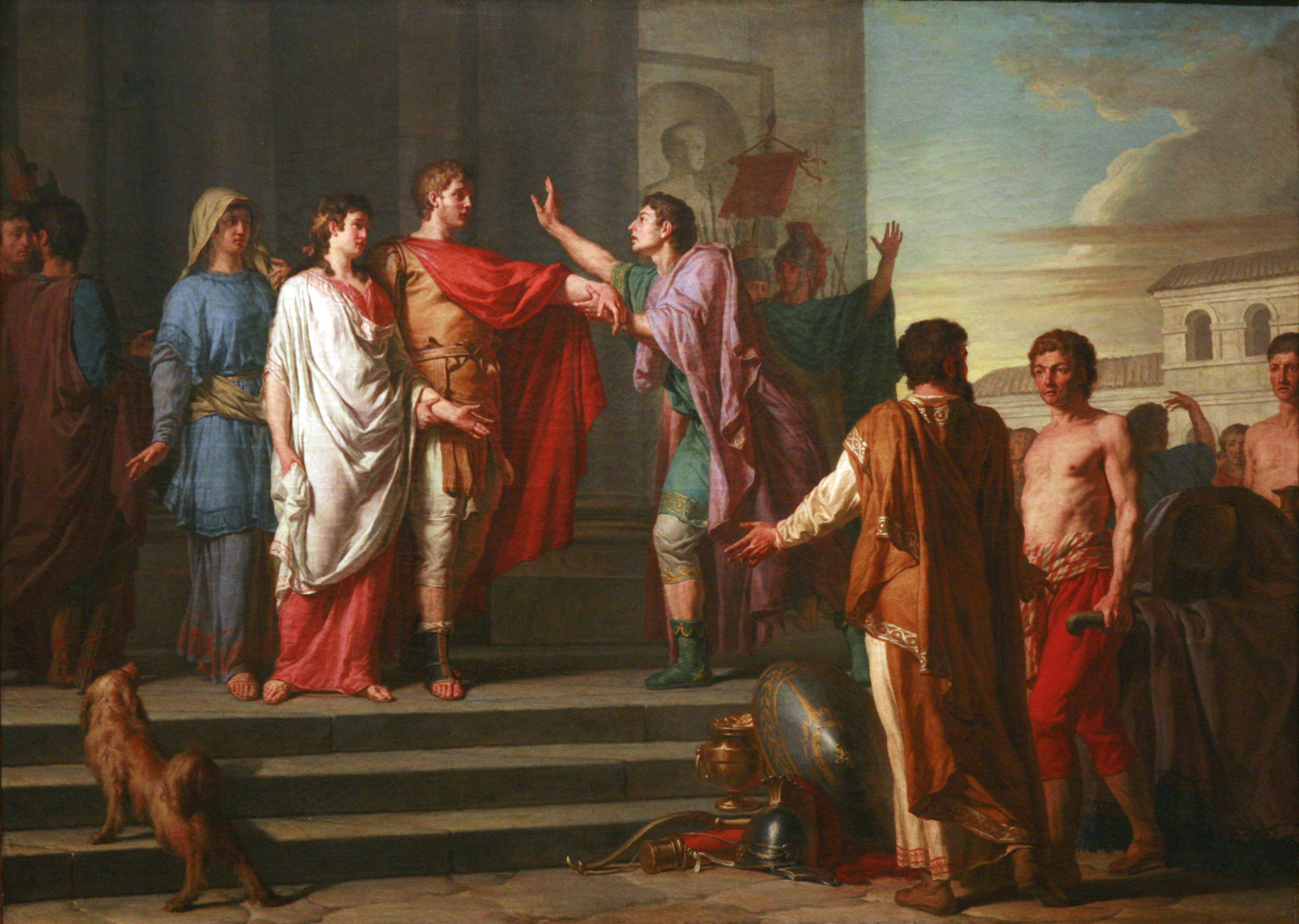
Continence of Scipio, Nicolas-Guy Brenet

The Roman historian Valerius Maximus, writing in the first century AD, alleged that Scipio Africanus had a weakness for beautiful women, and knowing this, some of his soldiers presented him with a beautiful young woman captured in New Carthage. The woman turned out to be the fiancée of an important Iberian chieftain and Scipio chose to act as a general and not an ordinary soldier in restoring her, virtue and ransom intact, to her fiancé. This episode was frequently depicted by painters of the Renaissance and early modern era as the Continence of Scipio.

According to Valerius Maximus, Scipio had a relationship from c. 191 BC with one of his own serving girls, which his wife magnanimously overlooked. The affair, if it lasted from circa 191 BC to Scipio's death 183 BC, might have resulted in issue (not mentioned); what is mentioned is that the girl was freed by Aemilia Paulla after Scipio's death and married to one of his freedmen. This account is only found in Valerius Maximus (Memorable Deeds and Sayings 6.7.1–3. L) writing in the first century AD, some decades after Livy. Valerius Maximus is hostile to Scipio Africanus in other matters such as his frequent visits to the Temple of Jupiter Capitolinus, which Maximus saw as "fake religion".

== Lost works ==
Scipio is said to have written his memoirs in Greek, but those are lost (perhaps destroyed) along with the history written by his elder son and namesake (adoptive father of Scipio Aemilianus) and his Life by Plutarch. As a result, contemporary accounts of his life, particularly his childhood and youth, are virtually non-existent. Even Plutarch's account of Scipio's life, written much later, has been lost.

What remains are accounts of his doings in Polybius, Livy's Histories (which say little about his private life), supplemented with the surviving histories of Appian and Cassius Dio, and the odd anecdote in Valerius Maximus. Of these, Polybius was the closest to Scipio Africanus in age and in connections, but his narrative may be biased by his friendship with Scipio's close relatives and that the primary source of his information about Africanus came from one of his best friends, Gaius Laelius.

== Legacy ==
=== Military ===
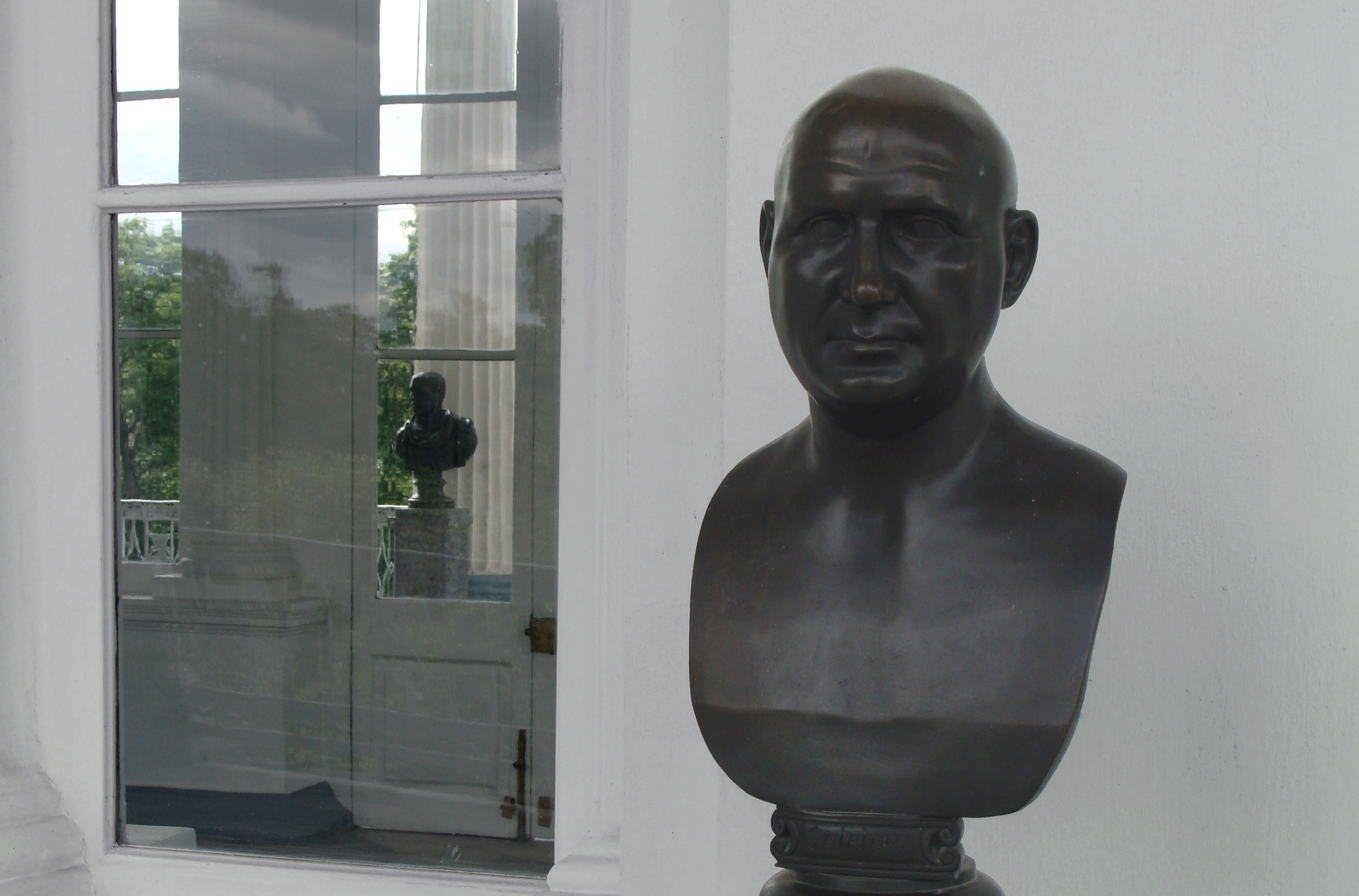
18th century bust formerly identified as Scipio at Cameron Gallery in Tsarskoye Selo, Russia

Scipio is considered by many to be one of Rome's greatest generals. Skillful alike in strategy and in tactics, he had also the faculty of inspiring his soldiers with confidence. Livy reports that, as a Roman commissioner to Ephesus following the defeat of Antiochus III, on meeting the exiled Hannibal, Scipio took the opportunity to ask Hannibal's opinion of the "greatest commander", to which Hannibal named Alexander the Great as the first and Pyrrhus as the second.

Livy continues, "On Scipio's again asking him whom he regarded as the third, Hannibal, without any hesitation, replied, 'Myself.' Scipio smiled and asked, 'What would you say if you had vanquished me?' 'In that case,' replied Hannibal, 'I should say that I surpassed Alexander and Pyrrhus, and all other commanders in the world.' Scipio was delighted with the turn which the speaker had with true Carthaginian adroitness given to his answer, and the unexpected flattery it conveyed, because Hannibal had set him apart from the ordinary run of military captains as an incomparable commander."

Metellus Scipio, a descendant of Scipio, commanded legions against Julius Caesar in Africa until his defeat at the Battle of Thapsus in 46 BC. Popular superstition was that only a Scipio could win a battle in Africa, so Julius Caesar assigned a distant relative of Metellus to his staff in order to say that he too had a Scipio fighting for him.

=== Political ===
Scipio was the first Roman general to expand Roman territories outside Italy and islands around the Italian mainland. He conquered the Carthaginian territory of Iberia for Rome, although the two Iberian provinces were not fully pacified for a couple of centuries. His defeat of Hannibal at Zama paved the way for Carthage's eventual destruction in 146 BC. His interest in a Hellenophile lifestyle had tremendous influence on the Roman elite; more than a century later, even the conservative Cato Uticensis (great-grandson of the elder Cato) espoused Greek philosophy.

Scipio did not introduce Greek ideas or art to the Romans, but his ardent support for the Greek way of life coupled with his own charisma had its inevitable impact. Less beneficially, the Scipios may have led the way in the inevitable chasm that grew up between the Roman elite and the Roman masses, in terms of the way the elite was educated and lived and in the amount of wealth they possessed.

Scipio supported land distribution for his veterans in a tradition harking back to the earliest days of the Republic, yet his actions were seen as somewhat radical by conservatives. In being a successful general who demanded lands for his soldiers, Scipio may have led the way for later generals such as Gaius Marius, Pompey and Julius Caesar. Unlike Marius or Caesar, however, he did not seek to use his charisma and reputation to weaken the Republic. The true measure of Scipio's character in this regard can perhaps be seen by his behaviour shortly after returning in triumph from Africa to a grateful Rome. Scipio refused to accept demands for him to become perpetual consul and dictator. For his self-restraint in putting the good of the republic ahead of his own gain, Scipio was praised by Livy for showing uncommon greatness of mind—an example conspicuously not emulated by Marius, Sulla or Caesar.

The relatives of Scipio continued to dominate the republic for a couple of generations. This domination came to an end in the tumults between the Gracchi brothers, who were his grandsons, and their other relatives in the period from 133 to 122 BC. The Gracchi brothers championed land redistribution in order to boost the ranks of potential Roman soldiers, as Roman soldiers needed to own land to be enfranchised for service in the legions and the number of Roman land owners was withering. They were lynched by their relatives who disapproved of their methods and perhaps had economic reasons to fear the land redistribution.

After the fall of the Gracchi, the house of Caecilius became more prominent. However, the Scipiones maintained their aristocratic lustre, providing the consular general who unsuccessfully prevented Sulla's second march on Rome and Metellus Scipio whose daughter was the last wife of Pompey the Great, and who took over command in the civil war against Julius Caesar after the death of Pompey. The granddaughter of Gaius Gracchus, Fulvia, was also unusually prominent for a Roman woman in the affairs of the late republic, marrying Publius Clodius, Gaius Curio and Mark Antony in turn. At a later date, some Roman emperors claimed descent from Scipio Africanus.

== Cultural depictions ==
=== Classical literature ===
Scipio appears or is mentioned in passing in Cicero's De Republica and De Amicitia, and in Silius Italicus' Punica (Cicero was mentored by prominent Romans whose ancestors had been associated with Scipio). As a Roman hero, Scipio appears in Book VI of the Aeneid where he is shown to Aeneas in a vision in the underworld. Scipio figures prominently in Livy's "Ab urbe condita libri" and is named as an example of a warrior at the end of Book III of Lucretius' De rerum natura.

=== Medieval literature ===
Scipio is mentioned four times in Dante's Divine Comedy: in "Inferno"—Canto XXXI, in "Purgatorio"—Canto XXIX, and in "Paradiso"—Cantos VI and XXVII.

=== Renaissance literature and art ===
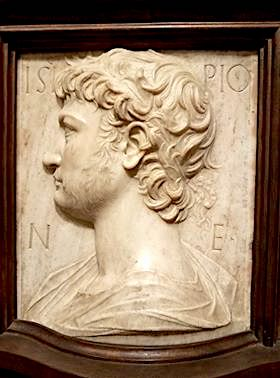
Portrait of Scipio Africanus, marble, c. 1460–1465, by Mino da Fiesole (Philadelphia Museum of Art)

Scipio is the hero of Petrarch's Latin epic Africa. 'The Continence [i.e. moderation] of Scipio' was a stock motif in exemplary literature and art, as was the 'Dream of Scipio', portraying his allegorical choice between Virtue and Luxury. The Continence of Scipio, depicting his clemency and sexual restraint after the fall of Carthago Nova, was an even more popular subject. Versions of the subject were painted by many artists from the Renaissance through to the 19th century, including Andrea Mantegna and Nicolas Poussin.

Scipio is mentioned in Machiavelli's work The Prince (Chapter XVII "Concerning Cruelty And Clemency, And Whether It Is Better To Be Loved Than Feared"). Milton mentions Scipio in Book 9 of Paradise Lost and in Book 3 of Paradise Regained. Raphael's painting Vision of a Knight is thought to be a depiction of Scipio.

=== Music ===
Publius Cornelius Scipio was the title character of a number of Italian operas composed during the baroque period of music, including settings by George Frideric Handel, Leonardo Vinci, and Carlo Francesco Pollarolo. The march from Handel's setting, entitled Scipione, remains the regimental slow march of the British Grenadier Guards. Scipio is also referenced in the Italian national anthem.

=== Film and television ===
Shortly before Italy's invasion of Ethiopia, Benito Mussolini commissioned an epic film depicting the exploits of Scipio. Scipione l'africano, written by Carmine Gallone, won the Mussolini Cup for the greatest Italian film at the 1937 Venice Film Festival.

In 1971 Luigi Magni scripted and directed the movie Scipione, detto anche l'Africano (Scipio, aka "the African"), starring Marcello Mastroianni, Vittorio Gassman, Silvana Mangano and Woody Strode, in which the historical events are portrayed in a light and satirical mode, with some intentional references to the political events of the time in which the movie was made.

In the 1983 BBC mini-series The Cleopatras, Scipio is portrayed by Geoffrey Whitehead.

In the 2000 film Gladiator, the first battle in the Colosseum is meant to re-enact Scipio Africanus's battle of Zama against Hannibal's barbarian horde. In the film, Maximus ruins the re-enactment by leading the gladiators, who are meant to represent Hannibal's forces, to victory over Scipio's legionaries.

In the 2006 television film Hannibal, he is portrayed by British actor Shaun Dingwall, notably at the battles of Cannae and Zama.

=== Video games ===
Scipio features as a playable character, represented by a cataphract, in the Battle of Zama in Age of Empires: The Rise of Rome. He also appears in the Haemimont Games video game Imperivm III: The Great Battles of Rome, Centurion: Defender of Rome, and in the Hannibal at the Gates campaign in Total War: Rome II. Scipio appears twice as a playable character in the Mobile/PC Game Rise of Kingdoms.

== Offices ==
The following table is derived from Broughton 1952, p. 555 unless otherwise indicated.

Year (BC)	Office	Colleague	Comment
216	Military tribune	Appius Claudius Pulcher; Gnaeus Cornelius Lentulus; Quintus Fabius Maximus; Gnaeus Octavius; Lucius Publicius Bibulus; Publius Sempronius Tuditanus	
213	Curule aedile	Marcus Cornelius Cethegus	
216–210	Proconsul		Spain
205	Consul	Publius Licinius Crassus Dives	Assigned Sicily extra sortem, then further assigned Africa
204–201	Proconsul		Continuously prorogued in Africa; victor of Zama in 202
199	Censor	Publius Aelius Paetus	
199–189	Princeps senatus		Chosen princeps senatus in his own censorship
194	Consul	Tiberius Sempronius Longus	Fought the Boii and Ligurians
193	Legate (ambassador)		Sent to Africa to settle boundary dispute and thence possibly to Asia
190	Legate (lieutenant)		Served under his brother, Lucius Cornelius Scipio Asiaticus
184?	Legate?		Possibly legate in Etruria

== See also ==
- Scipio–Paullus–Gracchus family tree

== Notes ==
Political offices
Preceded by L. Veturius Philo; Q. Caecilius Metellus	Roman consul 205 BC; With: P. Licinius Crassus Dives	Succeeded by M. Cornelius Cethegus; P. Sempronius Tuditanus
Preceded by L. Valerius Flaccus; Cato the Censor	Roman consul II; 194 BC; With: Ti. Sempronius Longus	Succeeded by L. Cornelius Merula; Q. Minucius Thermus
Preceded by G. Claudius Nero; M. Livius Salinator	Roman censor 199 BC; With: P. Aelius Paetus	Succeeded by G. Cornelius Cethegus; Sex. Aelius Paetus Catus
