= Publius Licinius Crassus Dives (consul 205 BC) =

Roman politician (2nd century BCE)

Publius Licinius Crassus Dives (died 183 BC) was consul in 205 BC with Scipio Africanus; he was also Pontifex Maximus since 213 or 212 BC (until his death), and held several other important positions. Licinius Crassus is mentioned several times (sometimes as Licinius Crassus or as Publius Crassus) in Livy's Histories. He is first mentioned in connection with his surprising election as Pontifex Maximus, and then several times since in various other capacities.

Publius Licinius Crassus, otherwise called Licinius Crassus or Licinius in Livy's Histories, was a handsome, amiable man of a distinguished plebeian family, who rose relatively young to the position of Pontifex Maximus (chief priest of Rome) before he had been elected curule aedile.

== Family background ==
Publius Licinius Crassus was the son of Publius Licinius Varus, whose ancestry is unknown. It is possible that he was related to the consul Gaius Licinius Varus (consul in 236 BC) whose grandson was Publius Licinius Crassus (consul 171 BC) and whose great-grandson was Publius Licinius Crassus Mucianus, also consul and Pontifex Maximus. The connections between these Licinii and the earliest mentioned plebeian consul Licinius and the more famous Gaius Licinius Stolo are not clear. Licinius Crassus is later described as "Dives" (or rich, an additional cognomen) indicating that he was particularly wealthy among Romans of his day (the family tradition of wealth continued, with several of his descendants, notably the triumvir Marcus Licinius Crassus, who was debatably nicknamed "Dives" as well).

Nothing is known of Licinius Crassus's mother or his childhood or early youth, or for that matter, his year of birth. He was probably born during the First Punic War (ca. 250-245 BC), and educated and trained much like noble Romans of his day.

== Career as priest ==
He is first mentioned by Livy in his Histories in connection with the death of the Pontifex Maximus Lentulus in 213 BC. In the election for Pontifex Maximus, two censors, the patrician Titus Manlius Torquatus and the plebeian Quintus Fulvius Flaccus, were suddenly joined by Licinius Crassus, who was then standing for election as curule aedile. Presumably, by then, he was already a pontiff or priest to be eligible for election, since Livy does not mention otherwise. Surprisingly, the two eminent censors were defeated by a younger virtually unknown man.

Livy does not mention the details of this election but later mentions that Licinius Crassus was handsome, amiable, rich, and well-connected. All of them might have helped him win popular support; it is also possible that the two eminent senior candidates cancelled each other's votes out, thus allowing the unknown third candidate to slip through.

Licinius Crassus is described as being well-versed in pontifical law; he is shown by Livy as reminding Romans of their religious duties repeatedly (particularly after the conclusion of the Second Punic War). As Pontifex Maximus and as consul, he also reminded the elderly Princeps Senatus Quintus Fabius Maximus Verrucosus in 205 BC during a debate that he (Licinius) could not leave Italy, but his co-consul Scipio suffered no such religious disability.

== Political career ==
His early political career is not known. However, like his future political ally Scipio (and a few other young Roman aristocrats of the same era such as Publius Sempronius Tuditanus), Licinius Crassus was elected young to important positions, being chosen to certain positions over those of greater age and seniority in the political arena. He was known for his learning in pontifical law, his great bodily strength, and his military skills (although he never won a triumph). Licinius Crassus is perhaps best known for his refusal to leave Italy, as Fabius wanted, which allowed his co-consul Scipio to take Sicily as his province and eventually invade Africa.

Licinius Crassus was elected to the following positions:

- Pontifex Maximus ca. 212 BC (held that position until his death in 183 BC)
- curule aedile ca. 212/211 BC
- censor in 210 BC, resigned without starting the lustrum, when his colleague died immediately
- Master of the Horse (Magister equitum) to the dictator Quintus Fulvius Flaccus, proconsul and former consul and censor (and his unsuccessful rival in the pontifical election) in 210/209 BC
- Praetor in 208 BC, elected the same year as Publius Licinius Varus (possibly son of the consul Gaius Licinius Varus).
- Consul in 205 BC, elected along with his political ally Publius Cornelius Scipio Africanus

During his consulship, Licinius Crassus remained in Bruttium, prosecuting the war against Hannibal, by then penned up in that corner of Italy. He was ill at the end of his year and so requested that a dictator be appointed to conduct elections since neither consul was able to be present. Licinius Crassus was appointed proconsul for the following year by the Senate. He was presumably relieved of his duties in 203 BC, when Hannibal evacuated all his troops back home.

== Family and descendants ==
Licinius Crassus's wife is unknown, but he had a son living at his death, also named Publius Licinius Crassus, who organized magnificent funeral games in 183 BC. This son was paternal great-grandfather of the future triumvir Marcus Licinius Crassus.

Descendants of Publius Licinius Crassus Dives Pontifex Maximus include:

Publius Licinius Crassus, fl. 183 BC, son of the Pontifex Maximus; who was father of

Marcus Licinius Crassus Agestalus

Marcus Licinius Crassus, praetor 107 BC

Publius Licinius Crassus (consul 97 BC), censor 89 BC (killed/died 87 BC)

Publius Licinius Crassus (killed ca. 90 BC in the Social War)

Lucius Licinius Crassus (killed 87 BC)

Marcus Licinius Crassus, triumvir (ca. 115 BC - 53 BC, killed by Parthians)

Publius Licinius Crassus (killed, or died by suicide 53 BC in war against Parthians) md 56/55 BC Cornelia Metella (herself great-granddaughter of Lucius Licinius Crassus), no issue.

Marcus Licinius Crassus, quaestor to Julius Caesar; he married Caecilia Metella Cretica, whose tomb is still visible on the Appian Way. She was daughter of the consul Quintus Caecilius Metellus Creticus. They had at least one son

Marcus Licinius Crassus (consul 30 BC), the last Roman general outside the Imperial family to earn a Roman triumph and the spolia opima; it is unclear to what extent Augustus permitted these to be celebrated. He adopted a son from the Calpurnius Piso family.

(adoptive) Marcus Licinius Crassus (consul 14 BC), born a Calpurnius Frugi. For more on this adoptive descendant, and his own descendants, see the Frugi family.

Other famous Licinii such as Lucius Licinius Crassus (consul 95 BC, censor, died 91 BC) and Licinia Crassa (wife successively of two consuls, Quintus Mucius Scaevola Pontifex and Quintus Caecilius Metellus Nepos, and mother of Mucia Tertia) may be descendants. Crassus left many descendants in the female line, surviving into the first century AD.

Political offices
Preceded by Lucius Veturius Philo; Quintus Caecilius Metellus	Roman consul 205 BC; With: Scipio Africanus	Succeeded by Marcus Cornelius Cethegus; Publius Sempronius Tuditanus
Preceded by Publius Furius Philus; Marcus Atilius Regulus	Roman censor 210 BC; With: Lucius Veturius Philo	Succeeded by Marcus Cornelius Cethegus; Publius Sempronius Tuditanus
