= Gnaeus Servilius Caepio (consul 203 BC) =

Roman statesman

Gnaeus Servilius Caepio (died 174 BC) was a Roman statesman who served as Roman consul in 203 BC.

He was elected Pontiff in 213 BC, replacing C. Pupilius Maso; he became Aedile in 207, celebrating the Ludi Romani three times. In 205 he became Praetor. As consul, he was the last Roman general to fight against Hannibal in Bruttium, (South Italy) where many cities surrendered to him; after the latter left Italy, Caepio crossed over into Sicily planning to go from there into Africa. The Roman Senate, fearing that Caepio would ignore their commands, created a dictator, Publius Sulpicius Galba Maximus, to recall him. Later on, in 194 BC, he was sent as a legate to Carthage, causing Hannibal's exile to the court of Antiochus III the Great the Seleucid Emperor. Then in 192 BC, he was sent as a legate into Greece to rile up the Roman allies in a potential conflict with Antiochus the Great.

Cnaeus Servilius died in 174 BC, during a great epidemic.

Political offices
Preceded by M. Cornelius Cethegus; P. Sempronius Tuditanus	Roman consul 203 BC; With: Gaius Servilius Geminus	Succeeded by Tib. Claudius Nero; M. Servilius Pulex Geminus
