= Gaius Aurelius Cotta (consul 200 BC) =

Roman consul 200 BCE

Gaius Aurelius Cotta was a Roman politician in the second century BC.

== Family ==
He was a member of the plebeian gens Aurelia. Gaius Aurelius Cotta, consul of 252 and 248 BC, may have been a relative.

== Career ==
In 220 BC, he served as praetor, and in 202 BC, he served as urban praetor. In the year 200 BC, he was elected consul together with Publius Sulpicius Galba Maximus as his colleague. In that year, Cotta was sent to Cisalpine Gaul to fight a rebellion of Gauls led by a Carthaginian named Hamilcar. The Gauls plundered Placentia and besieged Cremona. Cotta dispatched the praetor Lucius Furius Purpureo to deal with them. By the time Cotta arrived, Purpureo had already defeated the Gauls.
