= Lucius Veturius Philo (consul 206 BC) =

- Office: Consul (206 BC); Magister equitum (205 BC)
- Father: Lucius Veturius Philo
- Military career
- Wars: Second Punic War • Battle of the Metaurus (207 BC) • Battle of Zama (202 BC)

Lucius Veturius Philo (before 236 BC – after 202 BC) was a curule aedile in 210 BC, praetor of Cisalpine Gaul in 209 BC, propraetor of the same province in 208 BC, consular legate in 207 BC, consul in 206 BC, and magister equitum in 205 BC. He was renowned for having been the first to announce to the Roman Senate the news of the great victory won over Hannibal Barca at the Battle of Zama, which ended the Second Punic War.

He served in the army of Gaius Claudius Nero as a consular legate, fighting at the Battle of the Metaurus, and was a close companion to his co-consul of 206 BC, Quintus Caecilius Metellus.

He is different from another Lucius Veturius Philo, his father, who served as consul in 220 BC and dictator in 217 BC.

== Family background ==
Veturius Philo belonged to the Veturii Philones, an offshoot of the ancient patrician gens Veturia, a powerful patrician family of the Roman Republic. He was the son of the previously mentioned L. Veturius Philo who died during his censorship in 210 BC. Considering his birth had occurred at some point before 236 BC, he was most likely not the father of Tiberius Veturius Philo, the flamen martialis from 204 BC.

== Early career ==
In 210 BC, Veturius Philo was elected curule aedile, at which time, according to Roman law, he would have had to have been at least twenty-seven years old, indicating that he was born at the very least in 237 BC.

In 209 BC, with Quintus Fabius Maximus returning as consul for the fifth time, and Quintus Fulvius Flaccus doing so for the fourth time, the elections of praetors quickly followed, Veturius Philo being elected alongside Titus Quinctius Crispinus, Gaius Hostilius Tubulus and Gaius Aurunculeius. He was assigned the jurisdictio peregrina, or, the jurisdiction over the foreigners in Rome, as well as command over the province of Cisalpine Gaul. Upon the completion of his praetorship in Gaul, during which he had held command over two legions, Philo made the logical continuation into the propraetorship of Cisalpine Gaul, retaining command over his two legions and serving in that capacity during the year 208 BC.

== Rise to prominence during the Second Punic War ==
Following the completion of his time in Gaul, Veturius Philo served as a consular legate alongside the up-and-coming Quintus Caecilius Metellus in the campaign against of 207 BC against Hasdrubal Barca, which culminated in the smashing Roman victory at the Battle of the Metaurus, in which Philo would presumably have fought. Philo, along with Metellus and Publius Licinius Varus, was sent back to Rome to announce the victory and death of the Carthaginian commander. Making their way into the Forum, the three emissaries were forced to push their way through jubilant masses and into the senate, where Veturius read out the news, to the shouted approval of the senate, which declared a three day's thanksgiving.

Horsemen under Gaius Claudius Nero's command praised Caecilius Metellus and Veturius Philo highly for their actions during the campaign, and exhorted the commons to create the two as consuls for the next year. This opinion was seconded by the two consuls of 207 BC, Gaius Nero and Marcus Livius Salinator, the consuls sighting the "courage and fidelity" with which their legates had served them. Salinator, serving as dictator with the purpose of holding the comitia in 207, therefore made Caecilius Metellus his magister equitum, as well as consul for the upcoming year 206 BC, alongside Philo, declaring that the two would become so at the previously mentioned comitia.

Both new consuls were appointed to the province of Bruttium, "to carry on the war with Hannibal". Nothing much of note is said to have taken place in the area during Philo's consulship, although Livy does recount some happenings. Before leaving Rome, the two new consuls were instructed by the senate to return to their lands plebeians who had been displaced during earlier years of the war in the ravaged and desolated province. The senate also commanded this due to complaints they had received from inhabitants of the province concerning neighboring Gauls, who, taking advantage of the wartime confusion, laid waste to many areas therein. The two consuls preemptively, before heading to Bruttium, published an edict that required the citizens of Cremona and Placentia to return to their homes, giving a deadline for them to do so.

Heading to Bruttium, Philo received his army from a certain proprietor named Quintus Claudius, which he then proceeded to fill with newly raised soldiers, who he had enlisted on his own initiative. The consuls found that many had returned to their homes upon their arrival in the province at the beginning of that spring, and, presumably to drive away the roving Gauls and still-present Carthaginian-aligned forces that yet held control in parts of Bruttium traitorous to Rome, ravaged the district of Consentia, taking much loot with them. Despite being ambushed on their way towards Lucania after the looting by Bruttians and Numidian javelin-men, there was more confusion than real danger, and the plunder, as well as most of the men, were saved. Lucania thereafter returned its allegiance to Rome without resistance.

== Later career and Zama ==
The next year, 205 BC, upon Scipio Africanus' victorious return to Rome from Spain, Veturius Philo, in his capacity as outgoing consul, having returned from Bruttium, proceeded to hold the consular elections, wherein "all the centuries voted amidst much enthusiasm for Scipio", Publius Licinius Crassus Dives, the Pontifex Maximus, being elected as his colleague.

Later in 205 BC, after having stayed outside of Rome sometime longer to further clean up in Bruttium, Metellus saw his consular army disbanded as he was appointed dictator by Publius Licinius Crassus Dives, the consul serving in Bruttium that year, with the stated purpose of holding the 204 BC consular elections, Philo having done so for the 205 BC consulships earlier that year. Metellus made Veturius Philo, with whom he seemingly would have been close after years of service together, his magister equitum, before successfully overseeing the election of Marcus Cornelius Cethegus and Publius Sempronius Tuditanus to the consulships of 204 BC. Metellus duly abdicated his office as dictator upon the conclusion of the elections, thus concluding Philo's period of service as magister equitum.

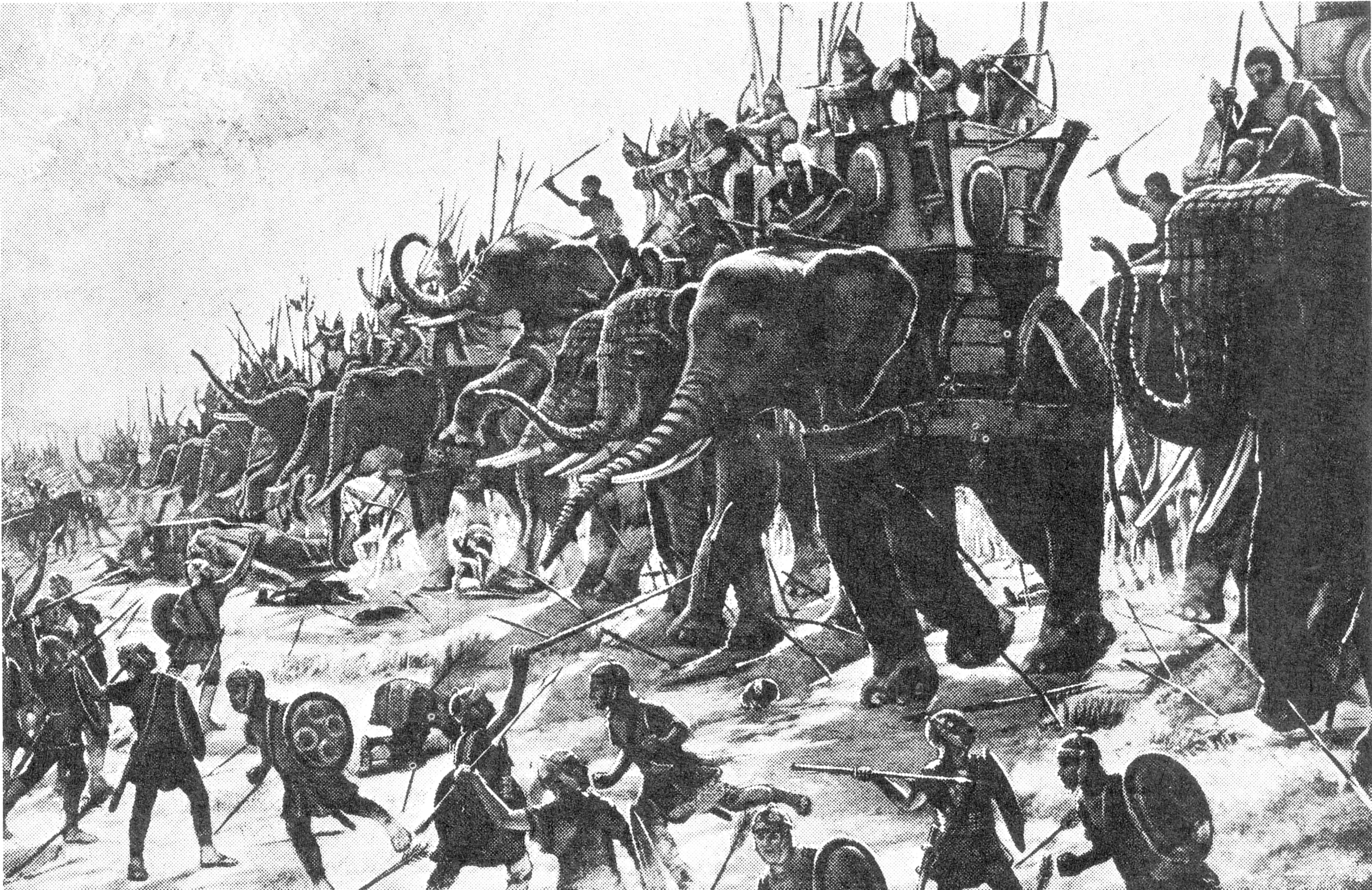
The Battle of Zama, in which Veturius Philo participated

In 202 BC, Veturius Philo accompanied the previously mentioned Scipio on his campaign into Africa. As armistice negotiations were dragged on by the delaying Carthaginians, hoping for Hannibal's return, Philo was sent back to Rome, alongside Carthaginian envoys, alongside M. Marcius Ralla and L. Scipio, the commander-in-chief's brother, to report the news of the three-month armistice that had been agreed upon. This news was quickly superseded by reports that the Carthaginians, Hannibal having returned, had broken the armistice and resumed hostilities, upon which point Veturius Philo quickly returned to Scipio's side in Africa.

Most likely witnessing the momentous final Carthaginian defeat at the Battle of Zama, Philo was sent with the news of the glorious victory to Rome, approaching the Senate, which had gathered at the Temple of Bellona, in a move reminiscent of that which he had performed after the victory at the Metaurus, some five years earlier. According to Livy, "L. Veturius Philo reported that Carthage had made her last effort, a battle had been fought with Hannibal and an end had at last been put to this disastrous war. This announcement was received by the senators with huge delight, and Veturius reported a further success though comparatively an unimportant one, namely the defeat of Vermina, the son of Syphax. He was ordered to go to the Assembly and make the people sharers in the good news. Amidst universal congratulations all the temples in the City were thrown open and public thanksgivings were ordered for three days."

Preceded by Gaius Claudius Nero; Marcus Livius Salinator	Roman consul 206 BC; With: Quintus Caecilius Metellus	Succeeded by P. Cornelius Scipio; P. Licinius Crassus Dives
