= Catia gens =

Plebeian family at Rome

The gens Catia was a plebeian family at Rome from the time of the Second Punic War to the third century AD. The gens achieved little importance during the Republic, but held several consulships in imperial times.

== Origin ==
The Catii may have been of Vestinian origin; Gaius Catius, who served under Marcus Antonius, is said to have belonged to this ancient race. However, members of the family were already at Rome by the time of the Second Punic War, when Quintus Catius was plebeian aedile. The philosopher Catius was an Insuber, a native of Gallia Transpadana, and may have been a freedman of the gens, or perhaps his name arose by coincidence. The nomen Catius itself may perhaps be related to a Roman divinity of that name, invoked for the purpose of granting children thoughtfulness and prudence. The nomen Cattius, found in imperial times, may be a variation.

== Members ==
- Quintus Catius, plebeian aedile in 210 BC, served in the Second Punic War.
- Gaius Catius, tribunus militum in the army of Marcus Antonius, in 43 BC.
- Catius, an Epicurean philosopher, thought to have been an Insubrian Gaul; he may have been a freedman of the gens.
- Catia, mentioned by the poet Horatius.
- Catius Crispus, mentioned by the elder Seneca.
- Tiberius Catius Asconius Silius Italicus, an epic poet, and consul in AD 68, at the end of Nero's reign.
- Tiberius Catius Caesius Fronto, the son or adopted son of Silius Italicus, was consul suffectus ex Kal. Sept. in AD 96, shortly before the assassination of the emperor Domitian; he is supposed to be the same as the orator Catius Fronto, a contemporary of Vespasian, who defended Marius Priscus, Gaius Julius Bassus, and Varenus Rufus. (Note: Niebuhr, in his Life of Cornelius Fronto, supposes him to be the same Fronto spoken of by Juvenal, who owned the house of the poet Horatius.)
- Catius Lepidus, a friend of the younger Pliny.
- Catius Marcellus, consul suffectus in AD 153.
- Publius Catius Sabinus, consul in AD 216, during the reign of Caracalla; this was his second consulship, but the year of his first is not known.
- Sextus Catius Clementinus Priscillianus, consul in AD 230, under Severus Alexander.
- Gaius Catius Clemens, possibly a brother of Priscillianus, was consul suffectus, probably around AD 235.
- Lucius Catius Celer, possibly a brother of Priscillianus, was an imperial legate in the time of Gordian III. He had previously been consul suffectus, probably around AD 241.
- Catia Clementina, according to an inscription, the wife of Iallius Bassus, and mother of Iallia Clementina.

== See also ==
- List of Roman gentes

== Bibliography ==
- Marcus Tullius Cicero, Epistulae ad Familiares.
- Quintus Horatius Flaccus (Horace), Satirae (Satires).
- Titus Livius (Livy), History of Rome.
- Lucius Annaeus Seneca (Seneca the Elder), Suasoriae (Rhetorical Exercises).
- Marcus Fabius Quintilianus (Quintilian), Institutio Oratoria (Institutes of Oratory).
- Gaius Plinius Caecilius Secundus (Pliny the Younger), Epistulae (Letters).
- Dictionary of Greek and Roman Biography and Mythology, William Smith, ed., Little, Brown and Company, Boston (1849).
- Paul von Rohden, Elimar Klebs, & Hermann Dessau, Prosopographia Imperii Romani (The Prosopography of the Roman Empire, abbreviated PIR), Berlin (1898).
- John D. Grainger, Nerva and the Roman Succession Crisis, A.D. 96-99, Psychology Press (2004).
- Inge Mennen, Power and Status in the Roman Empire, AD 193–284, Brill (2011).
