= Lucius Tiberius Claudius Pompeianus =

3rd century Roman senator and consul

Lucius Tiberius Claudius Pompeianus was a Roman senator and aristocrat of the 3rd century AD. He served as ordinary consul in 231 with Titus Flavius Sallustius Paelignianus as his colleague. His full name, previously known as Claudius Pompeianus, was only known after the discovery of a military diploma.

Although Pompeianus came from Antioch, he had deep Roman roots. His father was Lucius Aurelius Commodus Pompeianus, ordinary consul in 209. His grandfather was Tiberius Claudius Pompeianus, suffect consul in 162 and ordinary consul in 173, and his grandmother was the daughter of the Emperor Marcus Aurelius, Lucilla.

Political offices
Preceded by Lucius Virius Agricola, and Sextus Catius Clementinus Priscillianus	Consul of the Roman Empire; 231 with Titus Flavius Sallustius Paelignianus	Succeeded by Lucius Virius Lupus Iulianus, and Lucius Marius Maximus
