= Quintus Catius =

Quintus Catius was an officer (legatus) of the Roman Republic during the Second Punic War.

Catius was plebeian aedile with Lucius Porcius Licinius in 210 BC. Using money collected through fines, they dedicated bronze statues at the Temple of Ceres and presented games (ludi) that the Augustan historian Livy says were quite magnificent for their time.

In 207 BC, Catius was left in charge of the Roman camp at Canusium when his commanding officer Gaius Claudius Tiberius Nero joined consular colleague Marcus Livius Salinator to fight against Hasdrubal. Nero's move was virtually unprecedented; a consul was to fight only within his own provincia with the troops assigned to him by the Roman Senate, but Nero thought the circumstances justified extreme measures which also gave him an element of surprise. Catius was left to face off against Hannibal, who decided to stay put. This delegation of authority anticipated a highly controversial case two years later concerning an egregious exercise of imperium under Scipio Africanus by his legate Quintus Pleminius; Catius, by contrast, had benefitted from the nearby support of the experienced and respected Fulvius Flaccus, a four-time consul.

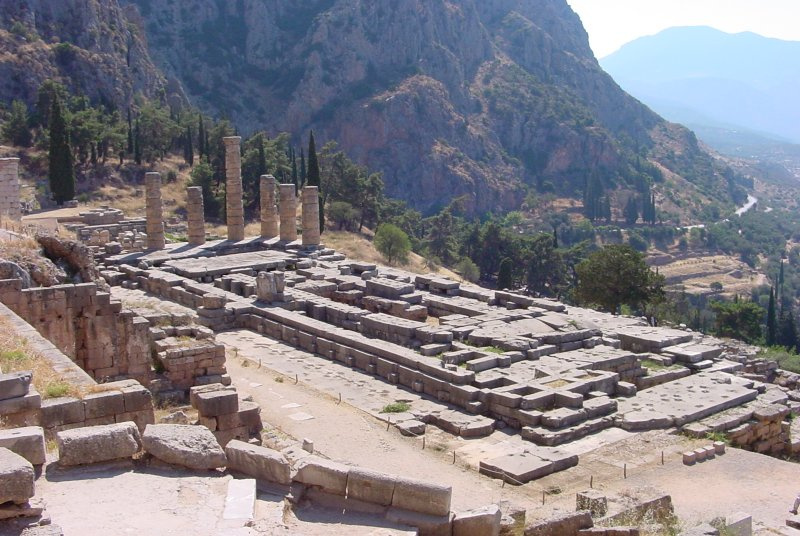
Ruin of the Temple of Apollo at Delphi

In 205, Catius and Marcus Pomponius Matho, who would later become the praetor in charge of the investigation against Pleminius, were sent as Rome's ambassadors to Delphi with gifts to dedicate at the temple. These included a 200-pound gold crown and images (simulacra) of the spoils seized from Hasdrubal, amounting to 1,000 pounds of silver. This embassy occurred in the context of what Livy characterizes as a sudden attack of religiosity at Rome, which in addition to a consultation with the Sibylline books resulted most famously in the importation of the cult of Cybele to Rome.

Catius and Matho received favorable omens when they sacrificed to Pythian Apollo at Delphi. The question posed by the Roman ambassadors goes unrecorded, but the oracle responded with what was probably already a safe prediction: "The Roman people will soon have a victory much greater than that from whose spoils you have brought gifts." This was taken as confirmation of Scipio's desire to operate in Africa.

The Catii were an obscure family; the only other member to attain prominence during the Republic was Gaius Catius Vestinus, a military tribune in 43 BC under Marcus Antonius.

== See also ==
- Catia (gens)
