= Sextus Catius Clementinus Priscillianus =

Roman military officer and consul in 230

Sextus Catius Clementinus Priscillianus (fl. 3rd century AD) was a Roman military officer and senator who was appointed consul in AD 230.

== Biography ==
Catius Clementinus was a member of the third century gens Catia, and it has been speculated that he may have been the son of either Publius Catius Sabinus (consul in AD 216), or a [Catius? Lepi]dus I[—], a suffect consul sometime during the early third century.

Catius Clementinus’ early career is unknown, but in AD 230, he was made consul ordinarius alongside Lucius Virius Agricola, which is attested by a military diploma. In the following year (AD 231), he was appointed Legatus Augusti pro praetore (or imperial governor) of Germania Superior, which is attested by an inscription. Probably from 236/237 until 238/239 he was governor of Cappadocia, where he is attested by an inscription on a miliarium.

Catius Clementinus may have been the brother of Gaius Catius Clemens, suffect consul about AD 235 and Lucius Catius Celer, suffect consul about AD 241.

== Sources ==
- Mennen, Inge, Power and Status in the Roman Empire, AD 193-284 (2011)

Political offices
Preceded by Marcus Aurelius Severus Alexander Augustus III; Lucius Claudius Cassius Dio Cocceianus II	Consul of the Roman Empire; 230 with Lucius Virius Agricola	Succeeded by Lucius Tiberius Claudius Pompeianus; Titus Flavius Sallustius Paelignianus
