= Quintus Caecilius Metellus (consul 206 BC) =

Roman consul (250 BC - 175 BC)

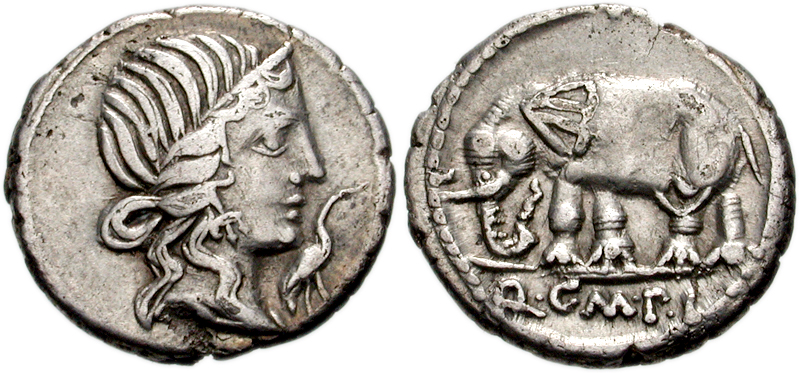
- Denarius of Q. Caecilius Metellus Pius (great-grandson). The elephant was a family symbol, referring to Lucius Caecilius Metellus' victory at Panormus in 251 BC.
- Born: c. 250 BC; Rome, Italy, Roman Republic
- Died: 175 BC (aged ~75)
- Office: Dictator (205 BC); Consul (206 BC); Magister equitum (207 BC)
- Children: Quintus Caecilius Metellus Macedonicus; Lucius Caecilius Metellus Calvus
- Father: Lucius Caecilius Metellus
- Military career
- Wars: Second Punic War • Battle of the Metaurus (207 BC) • Battle of Crotona (204 BC)

Quintus Caecilius Metellus (c. 250 BC – 175 BC) was a pontiff in 216 BC, aedile of the plebeians in 209 BC, curule aedile in 208 BC, magister equitum in 207 BC, consul in 206 BC, dictator in 205 BC, proconsul of Bruttium in 204 BC, and an ambassador at the court of Philip V of Macedon in 185 BC.

He served as a legate in the army of Gaius Claudius Nero and fought in the war against Hannibal. He was a political ally of Scipio Africanus, the man who eventually defeated Hannibal. He was also distinguished as an orator, the funeral sermon he pronounced at his father's funeral being counted among his best speeches.

He was the father of Quintus Caecilius Metellus Macedonicus and Lucius Caecilius Metellus Calvus.

== Family background ==
Quintus Caecilius Metellus was the son of Lucius Caecilius Metellus, a successful general who defeated Hasdrubal at Panormus in the First Punic War. Both father and son were members of the famed gens Caecilia, a powerful plebeian family of the late Republic.

== Early career ==
Caecilius Metellus first appears in the historical record in 221 BC, delivering a panegyric at the obsequies of his father, Lucius, who died that year. Quintus declared that "his father had achieved the ten greatest and highest objects in the pursuit of which wise men pass their lives". Among these he included being a "brave commander", "supreme orator", and "eminent member of the senate". Cicero comments that Caecilius Metellus was considered "a good speaker" by his contemporaries, alongside the likes of the famed Quintus Maximus Verrucosus.

In the disastrous year of 216 BC, after the grave Roman defeat at the Battle of Cannae, Metellus, alongside Quintus Fabius and Quintus Fulvius Flaccus, were all made pontiffs, to replace Publius Scantinius, Lucius Aemilius Paullus, and Quintus Aelius Paetus, all of whom had fallen at the previously mentioned battle.

Caecilius Metellus then, in 209 BC, is recorded by Livy as having become an Aedile of the Plebeians, alongside Gaius Servilius Geminus.

Metellus was accordingly made Curule Aedile during the next year, 208 BC, again alongside Geminus; the two Curule Aediles were noted by Livy as having ordered that year's Roman Games to be repeated for one day. Taking up a position as a lieutenant-general, or legate, in Gaius Claudius Nero's army, Metellus, along with Lucius Veturius Philo and Publius Licinius Varussent, was sent back to Rome in 207 BC to announce the Roman victory in and death of Hasdrubal Barca at the Battle of the Metaurus. Making their way into the Forum, the three emissaries were forced to push their way through jubilant masses and into the senate, where Veturius read out the news, to the shouted approval of the senate, which declared a three day's thanksgiving.

== Rise to prominence during the Second Punic War ==
Several of the equites under Gaius Claudius Nero's command highly praised Caecilius Metellus and Veturius Philo for their actions during the campaign, and exhorted the people to elect the two as consuls for the next year. This opinion was seconded by the two consuls of 207 BC, Gaius Nero and Marcus Livius Salinator, the consuls sighting the "courage and fidelity" with which their legates had served them. Salinator, serving as dictator with the purpose of holding the comitia in 207, therefore made Caecilius Metellus his magister equitum, as well as consul for the upcoming year 206 BC, declaring that he would become so at the previously mentioned comitia.

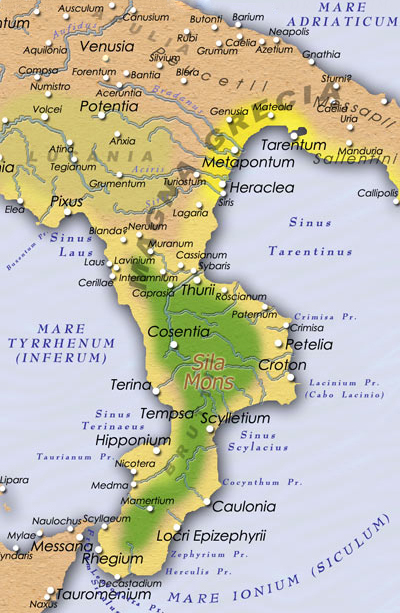
Magna Graecia, including Bruttium and Lucania, around 280 BC

Accordingly, appointed by Salinator, Caecilius Metellus served as consul in the year 206 BC, alongside the previously mentioned Lucius Veturius Philo. Both new consuls were appointed to the province of Bruttium, "to carry on the war with Hannibal". Nothing much of note is said to have taken place in the area during Metellus' consulship, although Livy does recount some happenings. Before leaving Rome, the two new consuls were instructed by the senate to return to their lands plebeians who had been displaced during earlier years of the war in the ravaged and desolated province. The senate also commanded this due to complaints they had received from inhabitants of the province concerning neighboring Gauls, who, taking advantage of the wartime confusion, laid waste to many areas therein. The two consuls preemptively, before heading to Bruttium, published an edict that required the citizens of Cremona and Placentia to return to their homes, giving a deadline for them to do so. The consuls found that many had returned to their homes upon their arrival in the province at the beginning of that spring, and, presumably to drive away the roving Gauls and still-present Carthaginian-aligned forces that yet held control in parts of Bruttium traitorous to Rome, ravaged the district of Consentia, taking much loot with them. Despite being ambushed on their way towards Lucania after the looting by Bruttians and Numidian javelin-men, there was more confusion than real danger, and the plunder, as well as most of the men, were saved. Lucania thereafter returned its allegiance to Rome without resistance.

During his time as consul, before having departed Rome for the campaign in Bruttium, it is also known that Caecilius Metellus came into dispute with the poet Gnaeus Naevius, who, upon the accession of Metellus to the consulship, pronounced "It's fate that makes the Metelli consuls at Rome", to which Metellus responded "The Metelli will make the poet Naevius rue it", in reference to his witty remark. Naevius was later driven out of Rome by a Caecilius Metellus-led group of nobles and imprisoned at Utica, where St. Jerome states that he perished.

The next year, 205 BC, Metellus' consular army was disbanded as he was appointed dictator by Publius Licinius Crassus Dives, the consul serving in Bruttium that year, with the stated purpose of holding the year's consular elections. Metellus made Veturius Philo, with whom he seemingly would have been close after years of service together, his magister equitum, before successfully overseeing the election of Marcus Cornelius Cethegus and Publius Sempronius Tuditanus to the consulships of 204 BC. Metellus duly abdicated his office as dictator upon the conclusion of the elections.

Metellus then served as a proconsul with command over two legions in Bruttium, the province in which he had served as a consul, during the following year of 204 BC, with orders to continue the fight against Hannibal, alongside one of that year's consuls, Publius Sempronius Tuditanus. Tuditanus defeated Hannibal in 204 BC at the Battle of Crotona, presumably with the assistance of proconsul Metellus.

In 203 BC, Metellus and other allies of Scipio Africanus made sure Scipio's command in Africa was prorogued. This led to Hannibal and Scipio facing each other at Zama in 202 BC.

After the completion of the Second Punic War, in 201 BC, Metellus, appointed decemvir, was sent along with nine other prominent Romans by the praetor of Rome, Marcus Junius Pennus, to Samnium and Apulia to organize the redistribution of public lands to veterans returning from the victorious campaign against Hannibal in Africa. Before leaving on this mission, while still in Rome, Caecilius Metellus spoke before the Senate, saying that "he did not look upon its [the war's] termination as a blessing to Rome, since he feared that the Roman people would now sink back again into its former slumbers, from which it had been roused by the presence of Hannibal."

== Later career ==
In 193 BC, Metellus is mentioned by Livy as delivering a speech to the tribunes of the people, Marcus Titinius and Gaius Titinius, concerning the contradictions present in written reports delivered to the senate by a consul of that year, Lucius Cornelius Merula, and a staff officer of his, Marcus Claudius Marcellus, concerning a battle against the Boian Gauls which had taken place that year near Mutina. His oratory was clearly still sharp at this point, as his proposal, that "nothing which the consul demanded should be decreed for the present", was accepted by the tribunes. Consul Merula demanded that he be granted a triumph by the senate upon his return from campaign to Rome, but the tribunes, according to what they had agreed upon with Caecilius Metellus, declared that they would veto any action by the Senate attempting to allow Merula a triumph. The consul, in the end, was never given one. Historian William Heinemann claims that Metellus' "criticism of Merula was unjustified".

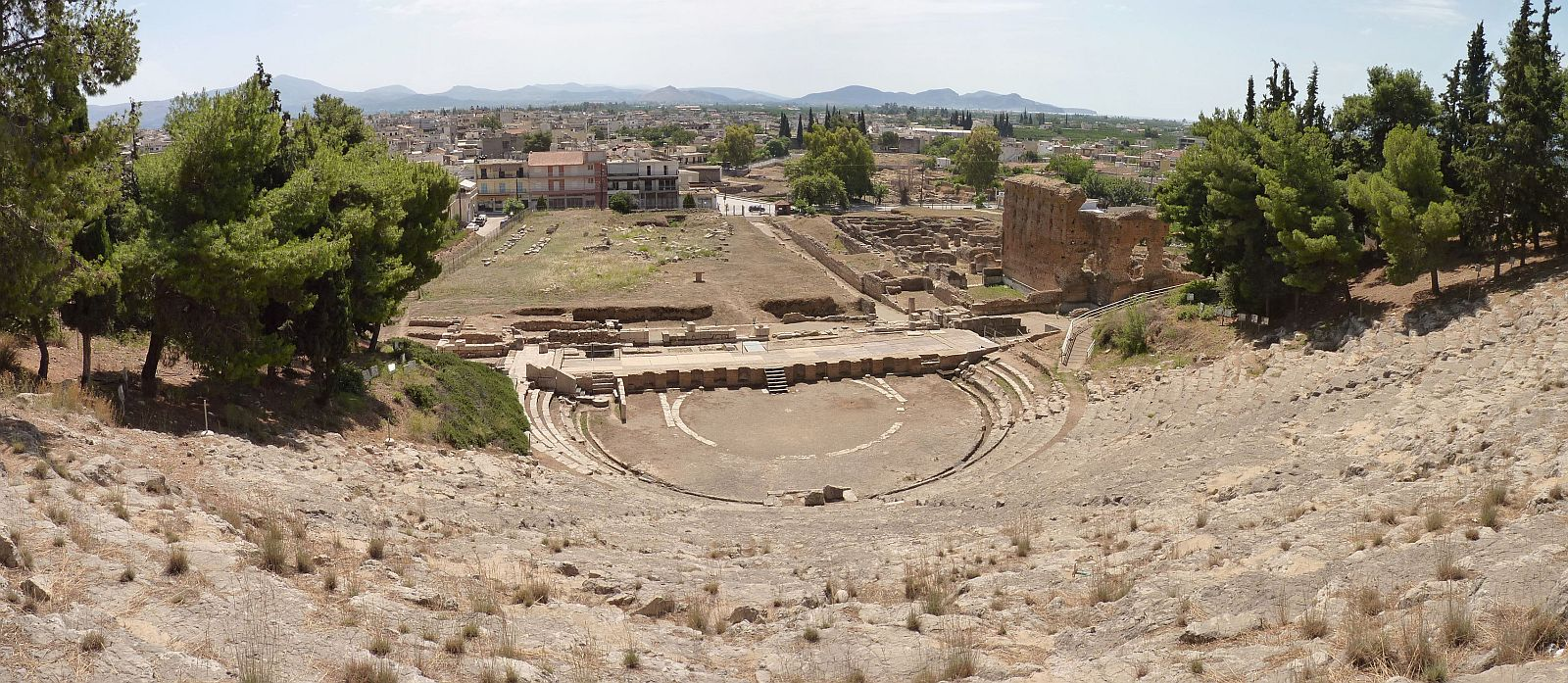
The theater of ancient Argos

Later, in 185 BC, Caecilius Metellus was sent as an ambassador alongside Marcus Baebius Tamphilus and a Tiberius Sempronius Gracchus to the Court of Philip V of Macedon, to investigate various charges brought against the Macedonian king by some Thessalians and Epirotes, as well as Eumenes II of Pergamum, in the wake of the Roman victory in the Seleucid War. There, Caecilius Metellus demanded that Philip evacuate the cities under his control in Thessaly and Perrhaebia. On his way back from Macedonia, Caecilius Metellus and the other ambassadors were passing through the city of Argos, at the time controlled by the Achaean League, where they met the magistrates of said league. Caecilius Metellus dIsparaged them for their harsh treatment of the Spartans, referring to poor management of that city-state after its defeat at the hands of the league during the Laconian War of 195 BC, which included "the razing of their walls, the removal of the population as slaves into Achaia, and the abolition of the laws of Lycurgus, on which up to that day the stability of their State had rested". The ambassadors demanded that the Achaean popular assembly be summoned to speak with them to discuss these grievances, but were ignored.

Caecilius Metellus, along with Baebius Tamphilus and Sempronius Gracchus, returned to Rome in 184 BC, reporting on the state of affairs in Macedonia and the Peloponnesus. Envoys from the Achaeans were also present in Rome at the time, and argued to the senate that their magistrates, in treating with Caecilius Metellus, had done nothing wrong, according to Achaean law, which dictated that the assembly was under no obligation to gather at the command of Roman ambassadors unless they came with a direct commandment from the senate to do so. Hearing this, Caecilius Metellus, stood up, accusing the Achaeans again of mismanagement of affairs in the Peloponnesus, whereupon the senate, after ensuring that the Achaeans would not make the same excuse again by clarifying the duty of the popular assembly to gather for Roman ambassadors, decided to send a new commission to the Achaeans.

In 179 BC, Caecilius Metellus addressed the two censors for the year, Marcus Aemilius Lepidus and Marcus Fulvius Nobilior, between whom was raging a persistent feud, which had led to violent quarrels between them in the senate and assembly. Upon being elected, the two new censors took their seats upon the curule chairs at the altar of Mars, whereupon Metellus, along with other leaders of the senate and a "large body of citizens", appeared. Metellus' oratory skill is recorded one final time as he addresses the two censors, criticizing them in the name of the people for their misconduct, and demanding that they change their ways, saying that "all of us with one voice implore you to put an end to these quarrels on this day and on this hallowed ground; we ask that the men whom the Roman people have associated together by their vote may through us be reconciled to one another." The crowd, voicing its approval of Metellus' words, drowned out his voice as he finished, only for the two censors to begin arguing again. Feeling the pressure, though, they ultimately agreed to respect the will of the senators led by Metellus, and "gave their word to dismiss all angry feelings and put an end to their quarrel", shaking each other's hands "amidst universal applause". Caecilius Metellus, along with the other influential senators, were praised by the senate for their initiative.

Caecilius Metellus died in 175 BC.

Preceded by Gaius Claudius Nero; Marcus Livius Salinator	Roman consul 206 BC; With: Lucius Veturius Philo	Succeeded by P. Cornelius Scipio; P. Licinius Crassus Dives
