= Gaius Catius Clemens =

Roman military officer and senator

Gaius Catius Clemens (fl. 3rd century AD) was a Roman military officer and senator who was appointed suffect consul around AD 235.

== Biography ==
Catius Clemens was a member of the third century gens Catia, and it has been speculated that he may have been either the son or grandson of Publius Catius Sabinus (consul in AD 216).

Catius Clemens’ early career is unknown. He was made consul suffectus sometime before AD 238, probably around AD 235. Around this time, between 236 and 238, he was possibly appointed Legatus Augusti pro praetore of the province of Cappadocia.

Catius Clemens may have been the brother of Sextus Catius Clementinus Priscillianus, ordinary consul of AD 230 and Lucius Catius Celer, suffect consul c. AD 241.

== Sources ==
- Mennen, Inge, Power and Status in the Roman Empire, AD 193-284 (2011)

Political offices
Preceded by Uncertain	Consul suffectus of the Roman Empire around AD 235	Succeeded by Uncertain
