= Lucius Catius Celer =

3rd century Roman military officer, senator and consul

Lucius Catius Celer (fl. 3rd century AD) was a Roman military officer and senator who was appointed suffect consul around AD 241.

== Biography ==
Catius Celer was a member of the third century gens Catia, and it has been speculated that he may have been either the son or grandson of Publius Catius Sabinus (consul in AD 216).

Catius Celer's early career is unknown. He was appointed Legatus Augusti pro praetore (or imperial governor) of the province of Thracia sometime in between AD 238 and 241. During this time he was probably made consul suffectus in absentia, around AD 241. This was followed by his posting as Legatus Augusti pro praetore of Moesia Superior in AD 242.

Catius Celer may have been the brother of Sextus Catius Clementinus Priscillianus, ordinary consul of AD 230 and Gaius Catius Clemens, suffect consul c. AD 235.

== Sources ==
- Mennen, Inge, Power and Status in the Roman Empire, AD 193-284 (2011)

Political offices
Preceded by Uncertain	Consul suffectus in absentia of the Roman Empire around AD 241	Succeeded by Uncertain
