= Publius Catius Sabinus =

Publius Catius Sabinus (fl. 3rd century AD) was a Roman military officer and senator who was appointed consul twice.

== Biography ==
Catius Sabinus was a member of the third century gens Catia, which has been speculated to have originated in either northern Italy or Cisalpine Gaul, although it has been noted that the family owned property in Dalmatia. The family may have descended from a first-century AD senator, although a second-century origin is more likely.

Catius Sabinus began his career as a Legatus legionis of the Legio XIII Gemina stationed in Dacia. This was followed by his election as Praetor urbanus before he was posted as Legatus Augusti pro praetore of Noricum probably between AD 206 and 209. He was next appointed consul suffectus sometime around AD 208–210, and this was followed by his appointment as Curator aedium sacrarum operumque publicorum (or the official responsible for maintaining Rome's temples and public works), which he held in AD 210.

An intimate supporter of the emperor Caracalla, in AD 216, Catius Sabinus was rewarded for his loyalty by being appointed consul for a second time, after an unusually brief interval of around seven years, this time as consul ordinarius alongside Publius Cornelius Anullinus. He may have been the consular Sabinus whom the Historia Augusta claimed the emperor Elagabalus had ordered killed, but whose life was spared when the centurion mistakenly expelled him from the city instead.

Catius Sabinus was probably the father or grandfather of Gaius Catius Clemens, suffect consul c. AD 235 and Lucius Catius Celer, suffect consul c. AD 241. He was also possibly the father of Sextus Catius Clementinus Priscillianus, consul ordinarius in AD 230.

== Sources ==
- Mennen, Inge, Power and Status in the Roman Empire, AD 193-284 (2011)

Political offices
Preceded by Uncertain	Consul suffectus of the Roman Empire around AD 208-210	Succeeded by Uncertain
Preceded by Quintus Maecius Laetus II, and Marcus Munatius Sulla Cerialis	Consul of the Roman Empire; 216 with Publius Cornelius Anullinus	Succeeded by Gaius Bruttius Praesens, and Titus Messius Extricatus II
