= Battle of Grumentum =

207 BCE battle

- Part of the Second Punic War
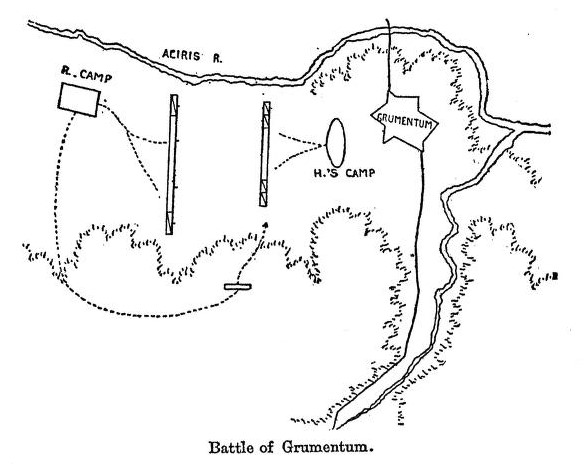
- Plan of the battle of Grumentum
Date	Spring 207 BC
Location	Grumentum, present-day Italy 40°17′02″N 15°54′22″E
Result	Roman victory

Belligerents
Rome	Carthage

Commanders and leaders
Gaius Claudius Nero; Tiberius Sempronius Longus	Hannibal

Casualties and losses
500+ killed	Roman claim: 10,700 8,000 killed 700 captured 4 elephants killed 2 elephants captured 2,000 killed after the battle

The Battle of Grumentum was fought in 207 BC between Romans led by Gaius Claudius Nero, and a part of Hannibal's Carthaginian army. The battle was a minor engagement that Roman sources inflated as a major success. According to Livy, the Romans killed 8,000 Carthaginians and took 700 prisoners for the cost of 500 dead Romans. The Carthaginian loss figures for dead and prisoners appear suspiciously out of proportion to each other. Just north of the battlefield the next day, an irregular clash occurred where allegedly another 2,000 Carthaginians were killed. Afterwards, Nero marched north, where he defeated and killed Hannibal's brother Hasdrubal at Metaurus. The battle is described by Livy at 27.41–42.

== Bibliography ==
- Livius, Titus (2006). Hannibal's War: Books Twenty-One to Thirty. Translated by J.C. Yardley, introduction and notes by Dexter Hoyos. Oxford: Oxford University Press. ISBN 0-19-283159-3.
