= Battle of Cremona (200 BC) =

Battle in the Roman–Gallic wars

- Part of Roman-Gaulish Wars
Date	200 BC
Location	Cremona, Italy
Result	Roman victory

Belligerents
Roman Republic	Gauls

Commanders and leaders
Lucius Furius Purpureo	Hamilcar †

Strength
A consular army (c. 18,000 foot and 2,400 cavalry).	40,000

Casualties and losses
2,000 killed	35,000 men killed or captured 70 standards captured 200 wagons captured

The Battle of Cremona was fought in 200 BC between the Roman Republic and Cisalpine Gaul which ended in a decisive Roman victory.

== Prelude of the Battle ==
In the aftermath of the Battle of the Metarus, which resulted in the death of Hasdrubal Barca and a decisive Roman victory. Hamilcar from Hasdrubal Barca's army raised the Cisalpine Gauls against the Roman Republic. Following this, Hamilcar managed to organise a Gallic army of around 40,000 men, following that, Hamilcar and his forces sacked the Roman city of Placentia. The governor of the area, Lucius Furius Purpureo, following senatorial orders, disbanded all but 5,000 men in his army and took up defences at Ariminum.

== The Battle ==
Upon the arrival of the consular army of Gaius Aurelius Cotta to their aid, the 5,000 soldiers were moved to Etruria. On the following day, the Gallic army of 35,000, led by a Carthaginian general, Hamilcar, began the battle by attempting to overwhelm the right flank of the Roman army with speed and numbers. Having failed in this task, they then failed to flank both wings of the Romans, for Purpureo had lengthened his flanks and called up legionary support. Now counter-attacking on all sides, Purpureo's men suppressed the Gallic flanks and broke their centre ranks, soon routing the enemy completely and killing or capturing over 35,000, including the commander, Hamilcar.

== See also ==
- Roman Republican governors of Gaul
