= Marcus Livius Salinator =

Roman general and politician

Marcus Livius Salinator (c. 262 – c. 191 BC) was a Roman plebeian consul (219 and 207), dictator (207) and censor (204), who fought in the Second Punic War, most notably during the Battle of the Metaurus.

== Biography ==
Livius was elected consul of the Roman Republic with Lucius Aemilius Paulus for 219 BC. Both consuls were dispatched against the Illyrians. The next year in 218 he was part of the consular delegation which delivered the ultimatum to Carthage, starting the Second Punic War. But on his return he was charged with malfeasance concerning war spoils during a mission to Carthage and was tried and found guilty on his return to Rome.

After his consulship, he retired from public life for several years, until 210 BC. In 207 BC, during the Second Punic War, he was again elected consul (supposedly against his wishes) with Gaius Claudius Nero. Arriving in Narni, Livius attempted to block the advance of the Carthaginian army invading the Italian peninsula. Encountering Carthaginians near Fanum in the spring of 207 BC, Livius, reinforced by the army of his colleague Nero, defeated the Carthaginians in the Battle of the Metaurus, killing their commander Hasdrubal, the brother of Hannibal.

Following the Roman victory, Livius returned to Rome where he was accorded a triumph. His colleague Nero entered behind him in a triumphal procession on horseback. Despite both consuls requesting a triumph, they may have wished to demonstrate their concordia by this arrangement. Appointed dictator by his colleague the same year to hold elections, he was prorogued after his consular term as proconsul to defend Etruria (modern day Tuscany and Umbria) between 206–205 BC and then Cisalpine Gaul in 204 BC.

Livius was elected censor, again with Gaius Claudius Nero for 204 BC. Their censorship was marred by constant quarrelling with Nero, particularly concerning a salt tax (inspiring his cognomen Salinator, which would be adopted by his descendants, including the Roman admiral Gaius Livius Salinator), as well as his vendetta against those responsible for his trial, continuing until his death several years later. Livius' wife, Calavia, was the daughter of Pacuvius Calavius, the chief magistrate of Capua in 217 BC.

== Footnotes ==
Political offices
Preceded by G. Lutatius Catulus; L. Veturius Philo	Roman consul 219 BC; With: L. Aemilius Paullus	Succeeded by P. Cornelius Scipio; Ti. Sempronius Longus
Preceded by M. Claudius Marcellus; T. Quinctius Crispinus	Roman consul II; 207 BC; With: G. Claudius Nero	Succeeded by L. Veturius Philo; Q. Caecilius Metellus
