= Quintus Hedius Lollianus Plautius Avitus =

Late 2nd/early 3rd century Roman senator and consul

Quintus (Hedius) Lollianus Plautius Avitus (fl. late 2nd to early 3rd century AD) was a Roman military officer and senator who was appointed consul in AD 209.

== Biography ==
Lollianus Plautius was the son of Quintus Hedius Rufus Lollianus Gentianus who had been suffect consul in around AD 186/8. He began his career as a Tribunus laticlavius with the Legio XIII Gemina stationed in the province of Dacia. Possibly in AD 195, he was a candidate for the office of Quaestor, followed by his standing for Praetor candidatus tutelaris in AD 200.

Lollianus Plautius’ next posting was as legatus proconsularis (assistant to the governor) in Asia in AD 201/2. This was followed by his appointment as Juridicus Asturiae et Callaeciae (or officer in charge of dispensing justice in Asturica and Gallaecia). Following this, or possibly during the same period, he was the Legatus legionis for Hispania Citerior, which he held from AD 202 to possibly AD 205.

In AD 209, Lollianus Plautius was appointed consul ordinarius alongside Lucius Aurelius Commodus Pompeianus. Finally, probably shortly after the accession of Alexander Severus (c. AD 224), the sortition awarded him Proconsular governor of Asia.

At some point in his career, Lollianus Plautius was appointed a Triumvir monetalis auro argento aere flando feriundo. (Prior to him becoming quaestor).

== Sources ==
- Mennen, Inge, Power and Status in the Roman Empire, AD 193-284 (2011)

Political offices
Preceded by Marcus Aurelius Antoninus Augustus III, and Publius Septimius Geta Caesar II	Consul of the Roman Empire; 209 with Lucius Aurelius Commodus Pompeianus	Succeeded by Manius Acilius Faustinus, and Aulus Triarius Rufinus
