= Badius (Campanian) =

Ancient Campanian general

Badius was a Campanian general of the 3rd century BCE. Virtually everything we know about him comes to us from an anecdote from the Roman historian Livy about the Second Punic War, in which Badius was a minor figure.

Badius was a Campanian Capuan fighting on the side of the Carthaginians at the Roman siege of Capua, a city which was then the Carthaginians' key ally in Italy. He had an established bond of hospitium ("guest friendship") with the general Titus Quinctius Crispinus, who was fighting on the side of ancient Rome.

He challenged his hospes, Crispinus, to single combat. Crispinus refused for some time, on account of their bond of hospitium. Badius rejected this, accusing Crispinus of ignauia, and arguing that their bond had been broken when Hannibal invaded Italy, and Capua declared for Hannibal, breaking the alliance between Rome and Capua. Therefore, they were no longer guest-friends (hospes) but were now enemies (hostes).

Ultimately, Crispinus was persuaded by his men to fight, and in the combat which ensued, he wounded Badius, who fled, leaving his horse and arms, which Crispinus brought back to his own camp.

Scholars generally regard this episode in Livy's history as a literary, symbolic foreshadowing -- with Badius's boorishness, disrespect for solemn bonds, and ignominious defeat -- of Capua's humiliation at the hands of Rome, for having abandoned its ties with Rome.
