= Gaius Claudius Nero =

Roman general and statesman, consul in 207 BCE

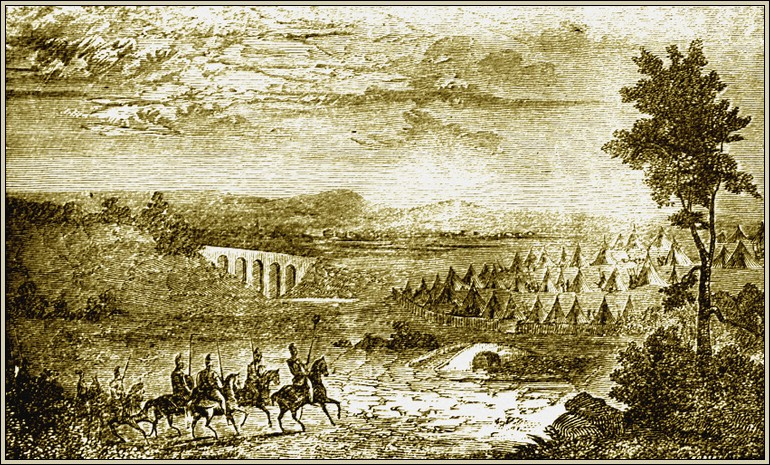
- Gaius Claudius Nero takes the head of Hasdrubal to the camp of Hannibal after the Battle of Metaurus, 207 BC.

Consul of the Roman Republic
- In office 207 BC served with Marcus Livius Salinator Serving with Marcus Livius Salinator
- Preceded by: Marcus Claudius Marcellus and Titus Quinctius Crispinus
- Succeeded by: Quintus Caecilius Metellus and Lucius Veturius Philo

Personal details
- Born: before 237 BC
- Relations: Claudia gens

Military service
- Allegiance: Rome
- Branch/service: Roman army
- Battles/wars: Second Punic War: Third Battle of Nola; Siege of Capua; Battle of Grumentum; Battle of the Metaurus

Gaius Claudius Nero (c. 237 BC – c. 189 BC) was a Roman general active during the Second Punic War against the invading Carthaginian force, led by Hannibal Barca. During a military career that began as legate in 214 BC, he was praetor in 212 BC, propraetor in 211 BC during the siege of Capua, before being sent to Spain that same year. He became consul in 207 BC.

He is most renowned for his part in the Battle of the Metaurus, fought alongside his co-consul and great rival Marcus Livius Salinator against Hannibal's brother Hasdrubal, for which he was awarded an ovation. The Roman victory at Metaurus River in 207 BC is widely seen as a daring strategic masterstroke by Claudius who surreptitiously left the main force of his army, which was holding Hannibal at bay in the south of Italy, to lead a small contingent of troops north to bolster Livius' forces, taking Hasdrubal by surprise. Considered by the Roman historian Livy to be the turning point in the war, the Battle of the Metaurus is listed in Sir Edward Shepherd Creasy's highly regarded The Fifteen Decisive Battles of the World. Theodore Ayrault Dodge describes it as “the finest strategic feat of the Romans during the entire war, as well as one of the exceptional marches in history”.

Claudius again served alongside Livius as censor in 204 BC before being sent as part of a triumviral embassy to Greece and Egypt in 201 BC.

== Early life and career ==
Almost nothing exists in the ancient sources about Claudius's early life. However, assuming that the absolute youngest age at which he could have been praetor in 212 BC was 25, he must have been born in or before 237 BC. He was a member of the patrician line of the gens Claudia, one of the most prominent families in Rome, making him a distant relative of the Julio-Claudian emperors: Tiberius, Caligula, Claudius and Nero. In The Life Of Tiberius, Suetonius claimed the Claudii defected from the Sabines about six years after the Roman kings were expelled (504 BC). Over time the family was "honoured with twenty-eight consulships, five dictatorships, seven censorships, six triumphs and two ovations". Suetonius also wrote that in the Sabine language, the cognomen Nero meant "strong and valiant".

=== The Third Battle of Nola (214 BC) ===
The first historical reference to Claudius is by Livy, who records his involvement as legate under consul Marcus Claudius Marcellus in the Third Battle of Nola, south-east of Capua, in 214 BC. Following Rome's disastrous defeat at the Battle of Cannae in 216 BC, Hannibal had begun pursuing a policy of turning the Italian allies against Rome. Soon after, the popular party in Nola attempted to surrender the city to the Carthaginians leading Marcellus, who was then serving as praetor, to mount a spirited and successful defence of the city. The following year Hannibal again attempted to seize Nola only to be once again repelled by Marcellus, who was now proconsul.

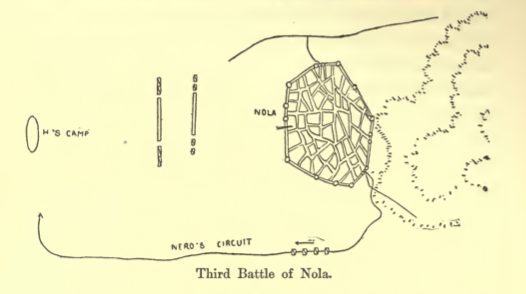
The Third Battle of Nola, 214 BC, showing the route Nero took to try to surprise Hannibal from the rear.

When Hannibal returned for a third year, Marcellus again prepared to defend the city. He sent Claudius out under the cover of darkness at the head of his best cavalry to circle behind the opposing forces and, once the battle was underway, attack from the rear. However, either through poor timing or by losing his way, Claudius failed to carry out the plan. Livy tells us that even though the Romans carried the day, killing 2,000 Carthaginians for the loss of only 400 Roman troops, without cavalry support Marcellus decided against pursuing the fleeing troops. When Claudius returned to camp around sunset, Marcellus upbraided him claiming "it was his fault that the disaster suffered at Cannae was not paid back to the enemy".

Dodge advises caution regarding Livy's account. While Livy recounts Marcellus blaming Claudius's tardiness for the plan's failure, Dodge points out that “Nero was a splendid marcher” and, more probably, the route he was assigned to pursue was simply too long to be feasible. However, the battle can still be seen as something of a change in fortune for the Romans. Not only was Hannibal repulsed, but the next day he marched out of Campania for Tarentum.

== Praetorship ==
Following Claudius's service as a legate he was elected as praetor for 212 BC alongside Cn. Fulvius Flaccus, M. Junius Silanus and P. Cornelius Sulla. It is worthwhile to note Claudius's cousin Appius Claudius was elected consul in the same year, demonstrating the resurgence of the Claudio-Fulvian faction and - reflecting Rome's restlessness and desire for a new direction in the war - a falling out of favour with the Fabii. Particularly in the years 212 BC and 211 BC, Lazenby notes that the "eclipse of Fabii would certainly seem to have had an effect on the Roman war effort".

In the drawing of lots for provinces Claudius was assigned to Suessula, a town in Campania of tactical significance due to its geographical location between Nola and Capua, on the Via Popilia. Claudius was placed in charge of an army around two legions strong, made up of those who had been serving under C. Terentius, operating out of the town Picenum. He was tasked with raising this force to its full complement then making camp in Suessula, a base from which he could assist in the operations against Hannibal in Southern Italy.

=== Siege of Capua (212 - 211 BC) ===
Numerous battles between Consular and Carthaginian forces in the area around Capua had occupied Roman attention for some time, but Hannibal's departure from Campania enabled the Romans to concentrate seriously on the siege and investment of the town itself. The consul Appius Claudius met his colleague Q. Fulvius Flaccus at Capua and Claudius was ordered to bring his army there from the Claudian Camp near Suessula as reinforcements. The combined forces of the three armies - numbering around 40,000 men - set up headquarters around Capua, where Claudius's men helped to encircle one side of the city with a wooden palisade and dyke along with blockhouses at intervals. Numerous skirmishes with Campanian troops were also fought throughout this process. During the first year of the siege, Claudius's praetorship ran its course but his command - as well as those of the two consuls - was prolonged and he continued the campaign as a propraetor for 211 BC.

Hannibal was inevitably drawn back to Campania and in the fighting that accompanied his attempt to alleviate the siege, Claudius was placed in charge of the cavalry of the six legions. This role consisted of holding the road to Suessula, preventing Carthaginian forces from penetrating the camp from the South, while Appius Claudius dealt with the Capuans and C. Fulvius Flaccus faced Hannibal and his forces. Claudius's army assisted in the defeat of Hannibal in that battle and Capua later succumbed to the Roman siege in 211 BC after the failure of Hannibal's march on Rome.

== Propraetorship in Spain ==
With Capua now captured, the Senate was able to focus on the situation in Spain. Rome urgently required a new general to fill the vacuum of command left there by the deaths of Gnaeus and Publius Cornelius Scipio. Late in 211 BC Claudius was appointed to Spain as propraetor with an army of 6,000 Roman infantry and 300 Roman cavalry, alongside an equal number of infantry and 600 cavalry provided by the Italians. There is doubt about the accuracy of Livy's figures as Appian records Claudius's army as consisting of 10,000 infantry and 1000 cavalry. Lazenby suggests that Claudius potentially only had 4,000 citizen troops with a complement of 6,000 Italians and this is where Appian gets his figure of 10,000.

=== Campaign ===
Upon his arrival in Spain, Claudius was tasked with reorganising Roman troops in the region - left decimated by the defeat of the Scipios - and consolidating Rome's foothold there against the rapidly expanding Carthaginian presence. After combining his forces at the river Ebro with the Roman army there under command of Ti. Fonteius and L. Marcius, Claudius advanced against Hasdrubal (Hannibal's brother and son of Hamilcar) who was in camp near Lapides Atri (the "Black Stones") and is said to have trapped him there. Lazenby has questioned this narrative as it is difficult to believe Claudius would attempt such an offensive move at a time of consolidation of Rome's then precarious position in Spain. If we are to believe Livy's narrative here, Claudius's actions against Hasdrubal in the end amounted to nothing as Hasdrubal supposedly evaded the trap at the Black Stones Pass by keeping up negotiations with the Romans while his men slipped away. Conflict between Claudius's and Hasdrubal's forces is said to have been limited to skirmishes between the Carthaginian rearguard and the Roman vanguard.

Claudius's tenure in Spain turned out to be brief however, as the senate was anxious to appoint a general with proconsular command. In 210 BC he was remarkably superseded by the young Publius Cornelius Scipio (soon to be 'Africanus') who had only previously served as a curule aedile. Claudius successfully reorganised Rome's forces in Spain to some extent, but his supposed failure to defeat Hasdrubal is a slight on his time there. Nevertheless, his hold on the coastal region north of the Ebro would be significant in providing the young Scipio a beach head for the renewed Roman offensive in Spain throughout 210 BC.

=== Reasons for early recall ===
There has been abundant speculation as to why Claudius was recalled from Spain so soon after his posting there. Haywood's conjecture that a shortage of good commanders in Italy required Claudius's presence back home has been questioned by writers such as Scullard, who argued: “If Nero was so urgently needed at home, why was he not elected to high office until 207 BC?”. Even if Claudius missed the elections for 209 BC he could have been elected consul for 208 BC in place of the less prominent Crispinus. As well as this, his service as a legate under Marcellus in 209 BC can barely validate his early exit from Spain.

Some historians have suggested Claudius was lacking in the diplomacy required for dealing with the Spaniards, critical to the success of the Spanish campaign against Carthage. His reputation as a hard and graceless man is supported by his later squabbles with Livius. De Sanctis proposed that the Senate was dissatisfied with Claudius's “Fabian” policy and therefore selected Scipio as the best man to resume the Roman offensive in Spain as a son and nephew of the Roman commanders who had achieved such progress in Spain previously.

It is likely that a combination of the above reasons, along with doubtless other considerations, played a part in the Senate's decision to replace Claudius's command in Spain. It is possible his assignment there had been made with an interim status in mind, with the plan to recall him as soon as he had stabilised the situation, providing that a reasonably capable replacement could be found.

== Election to the consulship ==
In the year 208 BC both consuls of the Roman state, Marcus Claudius Marcellus and Titus Quinctius Crispinus, died in an ambush. It was in these circumstances that the elections for 207 BC were held, and Livy tells us that Claudius was considered by the senate to be the pre-eminent candidate. Apparently this was due to Claudius's experience fighting Hasdrubal - at this time approaching Italy from the north - though once elected, Claudius was not actually sent by the senate to face off against Hasdrubal. Beside his military experience, Claudius's popularity was founded at least partly in the fact that he was not politically aligned with Marcellus or Crispinus, whose failures had encouraged a new direction for the war effort. The esteemed Fabius Maximus who was a friend of the deceased consuls, was not a more appropriate candidate than Claudius, but as the state could not legally elect two patricians as consuls could not stand alongside him either.

So although Claudius stood out as the most suitable candidate for the consulship, Livy felt the need to remark that "he was of a more forward and vehement disposition than the circumstances of the war, or the enemy, Hannibal, required" and thus it was necessary to pair him with a "cool and prudent colleague". The man chosen for this task was Marcus Livius Salinator (consul 219 BC). There was no small measure of enmity between Livius and Claudius: the former, following his first consulship, had been put on trial in 218 BC; the latter stood as a witness for the prosecution. Livius had been absent from public life since his withdrawal in 218 BC, and as such we are left to wonder how competitive this particular election may have been. Nero's previous command was superseded by the popular appointment of Publius Scipio, though not before he was outwitted by Hasdrubal at least once; his colleague Livius apparently wanted little to do with politics. Compared to other Roman statesmen of the era, neither consul-elect was particularly distinguished prior to the Battle of the Metaurus in 207 BC.

== The Battle of the Metaurus ==
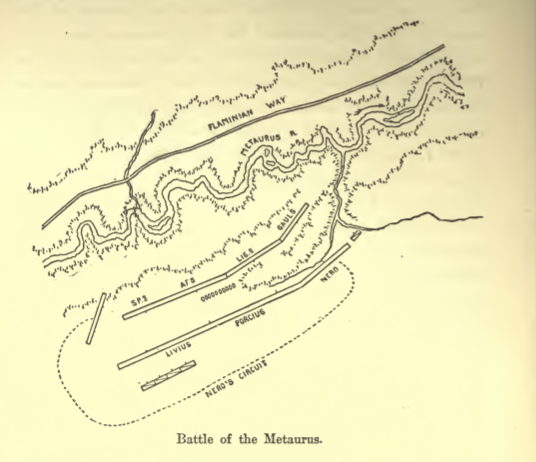
The Battle of the Metaurus, 207 BC.

=== Overview ===
The battle of the Metaurus was a significant battle in not only the life of Claudius, but also during the Second Punic War. It was fought near the Metauro River, in northern Italy. In 210 BC a new Roman army was sent to Spain under the command of Scipio the Younger. He came to the realisation that the war in Spain needed to involve striking directly at Carthage instead of attempting to win over the Spanish tribesmen. Two years later, in 208 BC, Scipio faced Hasdrubal near the town of Baecula; causing his retreat, the war was turning in Rome's favour. However, in a battle with Hannibal, two consuls were killed. One of them was Marcellus, a popular general and competent soldier, a significant blow to Rome. Nevertheless, in 207 BC the Battle of the Metaurus marked a turning point in the Second Punic War as a momentous Roman victory.

=== Events ===
Polybius gives a detailed description of the events of the battle, particularly the death of Hasdrubal and the strategy used by Claudius to seize the overall victory. Hasdrubal was followed by Roman legions led by Claudius as he was attempting to meet up with his brother Hannibal in Italy. Hasdrubal sent out messengers outlining the meeting point; these dispatches were intercepted by the Romans, providing them with the means to adopt an offensive approach now that they knew the plans. Claudius had been camped close to Hannibal, in a strategic position. He was stationed further south than his colleague and co-consul M. Livius Salinator, and he set off to march north to join Livius and eventually reach Hasdrubal near the Metaurus River. He left most of his army to keep watch, and joined up with Livius at night. After Hasdrubal realized there were two Roman consuls in the same camp, he decided to retire until he could make contact with his brother. Claudius was commanding from the right wing of the Romans; however he was obstructed by a ravine and couldn't get around. Ingeniously Claudius marched his troops behind the Roman lines to emerge in a surprise attack behind Hasdrubal's forces. Livy described this battle as a disaster for the Carthaginians, with around 56,000 troops dead.

=== Significance of the battle ===
The battle was a major Roman victory; it led to the defeat and death of Hasdrubal and was a major blow to Hannibal. After the battle was won and Hasdrubal was dead, Claudius ordered his head to be thrown into Hannibal's camp.

Gaius Claudius, the consul, on his return to his camp, ordered the head of Hasdrubal, which he had carefully kept and brought with him, to be thrown before the advanced guards of the enemy

This was clearly devastating to Hannibal, with Livy describing the aftermath:

Hannibal under the double blow of so great a public and personal distress exclaimed: 'now, at last, I see the destiny of Carthage plain'.

What you owe to the Neros, O Rome, the River Metaurus and defeated Hasdrubal are witness...

— Horace (65- 8 BC), from Odes 4.4, wrote this ode in praise of the Claudians, proof that the victory at the Metaurus lived long in the Roman memory.

=== Claudius's role ===
Claudius had been put in charge of the southern army, tasked to face Hannibal. He intercepted messengers, and made the authoritative decision that these were legitimate. These messages may have been a Punic trap, nevertheless he took about 6000 infantry and 1000 cavalry from his army of approximately 45000, to take on Hasdrubal. Claudius took these reinforcements to join Livius as a means of defeating Hasdrubal. He reached Livius’ camp at night, as Hasdrubal would not have expected that the army had been heavily reinforced. Claudius explicitly went against Roman law, which states that consuls were forbidden from leaving the front that was assigned to him without permission from the Senate. Claudius must have believed that if he lost nothing would matter, and if he won he would be forgiven for his actions. Claudius and Livius awoke to discover the Punic army was gone. They pursued the fleeing Hasdrubal, who had become stuck on the south shore of the river due to flooding. Claudius attempted to flank from the right but due to the rough ground ahead of him he was not able to, and withdrew his men to attack from behind the lines of the Roman soldiers. Claudius detached four cohorts, around half a legion, and created confusion amongst the Carthaginians, eventually leading to their defeat.

Polybius states:

"But as soon as Claudius fell upon the rear of the enemy the battle ceased to be equal".

Polybius described Hasdrubal's death, stating that he was a successful leader and great general:

"Hasdrubal had behaved on this occasion, as throughout his whole life, like a brave man, and died fighting".

=== Aftermath ===
When news of the victory reached Rome, the high emotional state of the people was impossible to describe. The Senate decreed a three-day public thanksgiving to celebrate the preservation of the Roman army and the destruction of the enemy and its commander by Claudius and Livius. The two shared a military triumph, and although Claudius's contribution to the success of the battle was equal to or even greater than that of Livius, Claudius had to be content with the lesser honour of ovation. Consequently, Claudius rode into the city on a single horse rather than the four horse chariot surrounded by soldiers that Livius enjoyed. According to Livy:

"[Claudius], even if he went on foot, would be memorable, be it for the glory won in that war, or for his contempt of it in that triumph".

However, Livy was writing in the Augustan period and that the emperor's wife Livia belonged to the Claudii Nerones, so some bias is to be expected here. The fact that little information on his later career and death survives in the evidence seems to support the view of bias. The spoils included 300,000 sesterces, and 80,000 bronze asses, and Claudius promised the same largesse of 56 asses per man that Livius dispensed to his men.

== The censorship ==
In 204 BC Nero once again shared political office with Livius when the centuriate assembly elected them to the office of censor. The ex-consuls carried out many duties in this high-ranking magistracy which lasted for a period of five years even though the usual practice was an 18-month censorship. They conducted the census of Roman citizens, read out the senatorial register, let out contracts for the maintenance of public infrastructure and performed the lustrum, or purification ceremony.

Under the censorship of 204 BC Q. Fabius Maximus was chosen as leader of the Senate for the second time, and seven senators had the nota, or mark of censure placed against their name which meant expulsion from the House. Contracts were put out for the construction of a road from the Forum Boarium to the temple of Venus and for a temple of the Magna Mater on the Palatine. The imposition of a new salt tax took place, which was regarded as unpopular. The census took longer than usual because agents had been sent throughout the provinces to report on the number of Roman citizens who were in the army. Livy reports the citizenship for the year 204 BC at 214,000 people but recent scholarship estimates that the number would have been closer to 240,000 when adjustments were made for soldiers serving overseas, and temporarily disenfranchised citizens. Note that women, children, slaves and foreigners were excluded from the census in this period. Nero performed the lustrum later than usual because of the extra work connected with the census.

Unfortunately the censorship of 204 BC was marred by the childish squabbling of the two men. The trouble began when the counting of the equestrian order commenced and as both censors owned a horse at public expense, each was required to account for himself. Claudius ordered Livius to sell his horse because of his prosecution by the people for incorrectly dealing with war booty in 218, and Livius retaliated by ordering Claudius to sell his horse because he had borne false witness in the trial. This incident was merely a spiteful exchange because any censorial action needed the ratification of both magistrates.

Another incident occurred at the end of their term of office which reflected badly on the censors and their office. Both men tried to reduce the other to the rank of aerarii, that class of person who was obliged to pay a higher tax because of a moral or other failure. The plebeian tribune Gnaeus Baebius put forward a motion to prosecute the censors for their unseemly behaviour but the Senate decided not to pursue the action to protect the dignity of the office against the whim of the people. It is thought that the action by Cn. Baebius was a ploy to shock the censors out of their outrageous behaviour.

== Ambassadorship ==
Freshly victorious from the Second Punic War against Carthage, an appeal from Attalus I of Pergamon and Rhodes concerning the hostilities of Philip V of Macedon arrived in Rome in 201 BC. Philip's aggressive conquest had already been marked by atrocity. Ravaging independent Greek city states before launching a brutal campaign in Asia Minor, Attalus feared the imminent threat of Macedon interest in his area. Rome at this stage had previously never had much interest in the affairs of the eastern Mediterranean despite the First Macedonian War focused in Illyria settled in 205 BC by the Peace of Pheonice. They nonetheless answered the fears of Attalus. With 201 BC consuls Gnaeus Cornelius Lentulus and Publius Aelius Paetus not yet returned from their provinces, an embassy was subsequently appointed to travel across Greece, Syria and finally to Egypt. With vast experience in diplomacy and war, the heavyweight triumviral commission consisted of the senior Claudius, along with Publius Sempronius Tuditanus who had commanded in Greece at the end of the previous Macedonian War, and the junior Marcus Aemilius Lepidus, early in his career yet clearly regarded as up and coming.

Reaching Athens, they met with Attalus and diplomats from Rhodes just as Athens had declared war on Macedon and Philip was preparing forces to invade Attica. Their meeting with the Macedonian general successfully prompted the evacuation of Athenian territory after urging the general to leave the allied cities of Athens, Rhodes, Pergamum and the Aeolian League at peace and imploring the Macedonians to come to an arrangement with Rhodes and Pergamum to adjudicate damages from the latest war. Philip had effectively eluded the blockade and arrived home, rejecting the Roman ultimatum and renewing his attack on Athens before besieging Abydus. In 200 BC, Marcus Aemilius reached him with a second ultimatum, of which was the final notification to him of the state of war:

As recounted in Polybius 16.34:

“The Senate had resolved to order him not to wage war with any Greek state; nor to interfere in the dominions of Ptolemy; and to submit the injuries inflicted on Attalus and the Rhodians to arbitration; and that if he did so he might have peace, but if he refused to obey he would promptly have war with Rome. Upon Philip endeavouring to show that the Rhodians had been the first to lay hands on him, Marcus interrupted him by saying: "But what about the Athenians? And what about the Cianians? And what about the Abydenians at this moment? Did any one of them also lay hands on you first?" The king, at a loss for a reply, said: "I pardon the offensive haughtiness of your manners for three reasons: first, because you are a young man and inexperienced in affairs; secondly, because you are the handsomest man of your time" (this was true); "and thirdly, because you are a Roman. But for my part, my first demand to the Romans is that they should not break their treaties or go to war with me; but if they do, I shall defend myself as courageously as I can, appealing to the gods to defend my cause.”

From here forth, in anticipation of the Second Macedonian War as military mobilisation and naval forces prepared, the energetic campaign enlisting as many allies as possible for the Romans continued to mount with the triumviral embassy serving as their contacts. The main Greek powers became secured in the Roman camp - the Aetolian League, Rhodes, King Attalus, Athens, as well as the eventual alignment of the Achaean League. It is unclear if or at which stages the others separated during this period considering there were many places to visit, but it is likely that all three envoys would have fulfilled their instructions to further contact the young Ptolemy V in Egypt and Antiochus of the Seleucid Empire, who had signed previously signed a secret pact with Philip that saw the exploitation of the young king's territory for themselves. Their visit to Egypt would probably see the ambassadors announce Rome's victory over Carthage as well as ensure the continuation of the Roman alliance. Moreover, they most likely would have been instructed to gauge conditions and ensure that neither king could or would interfere in the Aegean, given Antiochus’ enormous power and military potential.

Presumably, they completed their mission by late 200 BC or early 199 BC. From this point, Claudius is not mentioned again, and it is believed he may have died.

Political offices
Preceded by Marcus Claudius Marcellus and Titus Quinctius Crispinus	Consul of the Roman Republic with Marcus Livius Salinator; 207 BC	Succeeded by Quintus Caecilius Metellus and Lucius Veturius Philo
