= Lucius Aurelius Commodus Pompeianus =

Roman senator (c.177–c.212)

Lucius Aurelius Commodus Pompeianus (c. 177 – 211/212) was a Roman senator active in the early 3rd century. He was the son of Lucilla, the daughter of Marcus Aurelius, and her second husband Tiberius Claudius Pompeianus, a general active politically during the reigns of Emperors Commodus and Pertinax.

Little is known of Pompeianus himself. As Oates expresses it, "He has a ringing name of great auctoritas, but we do not know if he was capax imperii." He dedicated an altar for the welfare of Septimius Severus and his family in Lugdunum while serving as military tribune in the Legio I Minervia, which would date his commission to the early years of Severus' reign, in the 190s. In 209, he achieved the rank of consul. If Pompeianus became consul suo anno, as John Oates suggests, then he was born in 177, and was five years old when his mother Lucilla was executed in the aftermath of a failed attempt to assassinate her brother Commodus. John Oates opines that he and his father Tiberius had retired to their country estates in 180 when Commodus ascended to the throne.

In 211/212, he was executed by Caracalla, following the murder of Caracalla's brother Geta. H.-G. Pflaum notes that Caracalla took the precaution of making the murder appear to have been perpetrated by bandits.

Lucius Tiberius Claudius Pompeianus (cos. ord. 231) and Clodius Pompeianus (cos. ord. 241) are likely to have been his sons.

== Sources ==
- Mennen, Inge, Power and Status in the Roman Empire, AD 193-284 (2011)

Political offices
Preceded by Marcus Aurelius Antoninus Augustus III, and Publius Septimius Geta Caesar II	Consul of the Roman Empire; 209 with Quintus Hedius Lollianus Plautius Avitus	Succeeded by Manius Acilius Faustinus, and Aulus Triarius Rufinus
