= Tiberius Claudius Pompeianus =

Roman politician and general (c. 125 – 193 AD)

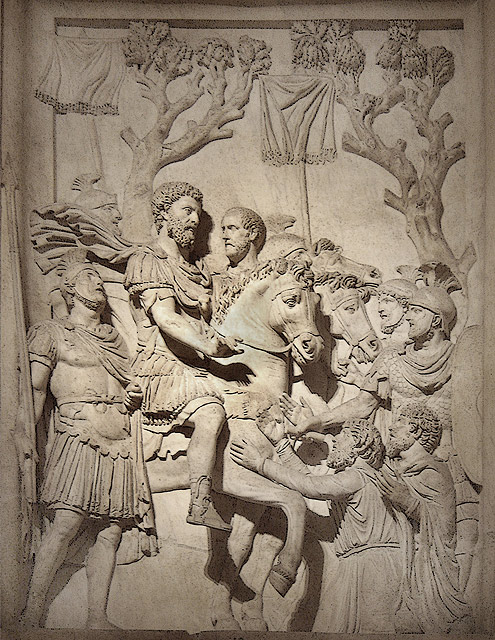
- Marble relief of Tiberius Claudius Pompeianus (center right) with Emperor Marcus Aurelius in the Capitoline Museums in Rome

Consul of the Roman Empire
- In office 173 AD – 173 AD Serving with Gnaeus Claudius Severus
- Preceded by: Servius Calpurnius Scipio Orfitus and Sextus Quintilius Maximus
- Succeeded by: Lucius Aurelius Gallus and Quintus Volusius Flaccus Cornelianus

Military Governor of Pannonia Inferior
- In office 164 AD – 168 AD

Suffect Consul of the Roman Empire
- In office 162 AD – 162 AD Serving with Tiberius Claudius Paullinus
- Preceded by: Junius Rusticus and Lucius Titius Plautius Aquilinus
- Succeeded by: Marcus Insteius Bithynicus and ignotus

Personal details
- Born: 125 AD Antioch, Syria, Roman Empire (modern-day Antakya, Hatay, Turkey)
- Died: 193 AD (aged 68) Rome, Roman Empire (modern-day Rome, Italy)
- Spouse: Lucilla (m. 169; d. 182)
- Children: Lucius Aurelius Commodus Pompeianus, Tiberius Claudius Pompeianus Quintianus

Tiberius Claudius Pompeianus (Greek: Πομπηιανός; c. 125 – 193 AD) was a politician and military commander during the 2nd century in the Roman Empire. A general under Emperor Marcus Aurelius, Pompeianus distinguished himself during Rome's wars against the Parthians and the Marcomanni. He was a member of the imperial family due to his marriage to Lucilla, a daughter of Marcus Aurelius, and was a key figure during the emperor's reign. Pompeianus was offered the imperial throne three times, though he refused to claim the title for himself.

== Early life ==
A native of Antioch in Syria, Pompeianus was from relatively humble origins. His father was a member of the equestrian order. As indicated by his name, his family first gained Roman citizenship during the reign of Emperor Claudius. Pompeianus was a novus homo ("new man") as he was the first member of his family to be appointed as a senator.

Much of Pompeianus' early life has been lost to history. He participated in the Roman–Parthian War of 161–166 under the command of Emperor Lucius Verus, likely as a legionary commander. Sometime prior to the Parthian campaign, he was elevated to the rank of senator. He served with distinction during the war, earning him appointment as suffect consul for the remainder of the year 162 AD.

== Marcomannic Wars ==
Following the completion the Parthian campaign, Emperor Marcus Aurelius appointed him military governor of Pannonia Inferior on the empire's northern frontier along the Danube River. (Note: CIL XVI, 00123) He likely served from 164 until 168. In late 166 or early 167, a force of 6,000 Lombards invaded Pannonia. Pompeianus defeated the invasion with relative ease, but it marked the beginning of a larger barbarian invasion.

Late in 167, the Marcomanni tribe invaded the empire by crossing in Pannonia. Marcus Aurelius and Lucius Verus planned a punitive expedition to drive the barbarians back across the Danube River, but due to the effects of the Antonine Plague, the expedition was postponed until early 168. Aided by Pompeianus, the two emperors were able to force the Marcomanni to retreat. Pompeianus' military skills earned him the confidence of Marcus Aurelius and he quickly became one of the Emperor's closest advisors.

As the emperors returned to their winter quarters in Aquileia, Lucius Verus fell ill and died in January 169. Marcus Aurelius arranged for his daughter Lucilla, Verus' widow, to marry Pompeianus. As son-in-law to the emperor, Pompeianus became a member of the Nerva–Antonine dynasty. The emperor even offered to name Pompeianus Caesar and his heir, but Pompeianus declined the title. Instead, Pompeianus was promoted and served as the emperor's chief general during the Marcomannic War. Under his guidance, the exiled senator and fellow Parthian war veteran Pertinax was recalled and joined Pompeianus on his military staff.

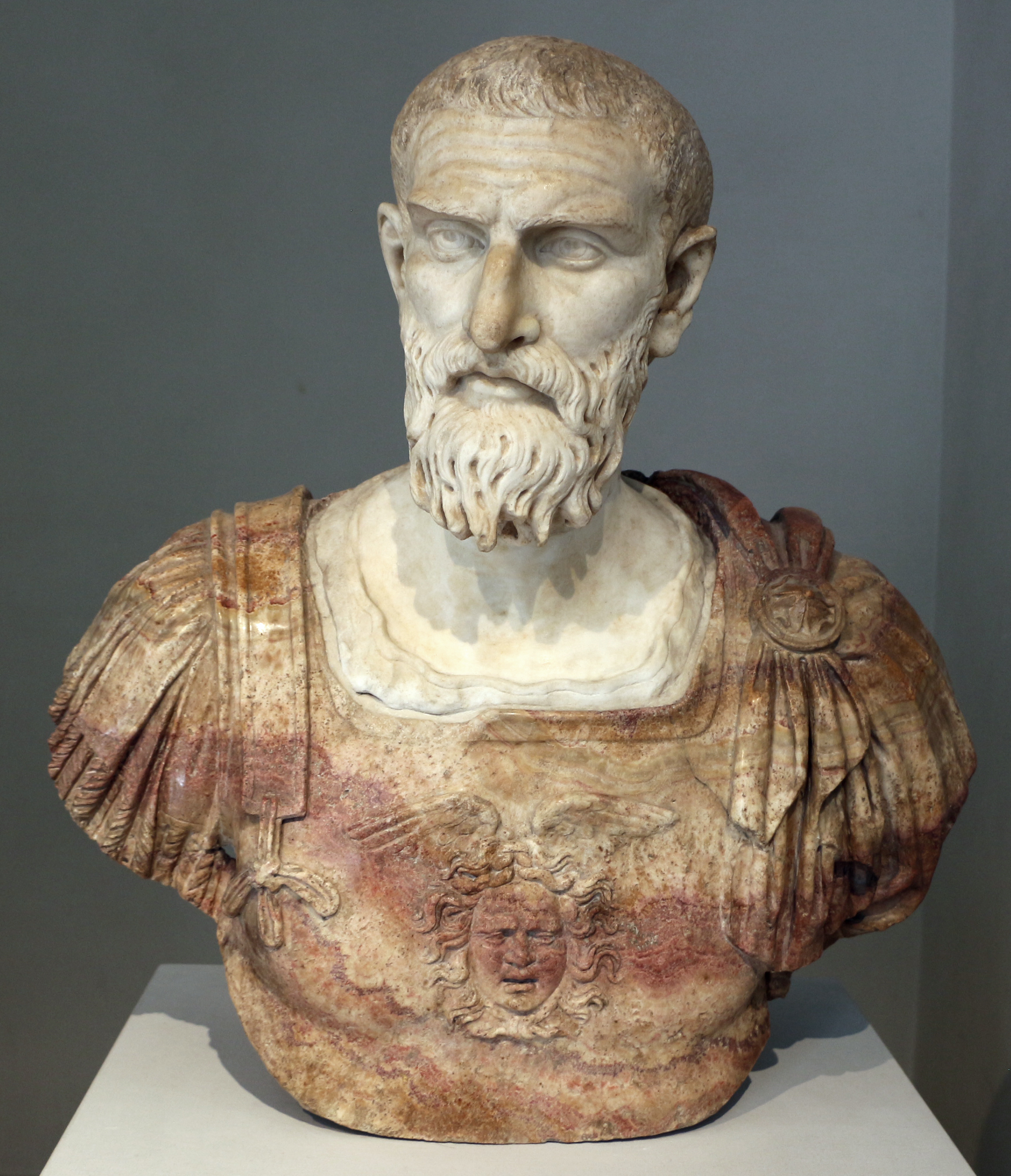
Bust of Pompeianus, now in the Venice National Archaeological Museum

Pompeianus' successes during the Marcomannic War further distinguished him, with the emperor awarding him a second consulship in 173. (Note: CIL IX, 04970 and CIL XI, 7555) He took part in a number of military operations in the Danubian region and was still stationed in the region following the death of Marcus Aurelius. (Note: CIL III, 6176)

== Under Commodus ==
Marcus Aurelius died in 180 AD, and his 18-year-old son Commodus, Pompeianus' brother-in-law, was proclaimed Roman emperor. Pompeianus tried to persuade Commodus to remain on the Danubian frontier to complete the conquest of the Marcomanni, but Commodus returned to Rome in the autumn of 180.

The relationship between the young emperor and the experienced officer quickly deteriorated. In 182, Lucilla, Pompeianus' wife and Commodus' sister, organized a failed assassination attempt against the emperor. Though Commodus executed Lucilla and other members of her family, Pompeianus had not participated in the conspiracy and was spared. Following the conspiracy, Pompeianus withdrew from public life, citing old age, and retired to his estates in Italy. He spent most of his time in the country away from Rome, claiming age and an ailment of the eyes as an excuse.

== Later life ==
Commodus was assassinated in 192 AD by members of the Praetorian Guard. Pompeianus returned to Rome once the plot against Commodus succeeded, resuming his seat in the Senate.

Pertinax, who was the urban prefect at the time, offered the throne to Pompeianus, but he declined. The Praetorian Guard then proclaimed Pertinax the emperor, but they assassinated him after only 87 days for attempting to impose order upon the long-undisciplined unit. Senator Didius Julianus bribed the Praetorian Guard to proclaim him emperor, but had difficulty garnering support within the ranks of his own troops. In a desperate attempt to save himself, Julianus asked Pompeianus to become co-emperor with him. Pompeianus again declined, on the grounds of his advanced years and eye problems. Julianus was executed on the orders of Septimius Severus after ruling for only 66 days.

Pompeianus appears to have died sometime in 193. His children survived and prospered as members of an important family: they were the grandchildren of Marcus Aurelius. This prestige was dangerous because the new dynasty of the Severans could have seen them as possible competition. Aurelius, son of Pompeianus, was consul in 209, but was later assassinated at the instigation of Caracalla. Later descendants of Pompeianus would become consuls in 231 and 241.

== In popular culture ==
Russell Crowe's character Maximus Decimus Meridius in the 2000 film Gladiator is loosely based on Pompeianus and others, including Narcissus.

== Nerva–Antonine family tree ==
Nerva–Antonine family tree

Q. Marcius Barea Soranus	Q. Marcius Barea Sura	Antonia Furnilla	M. Cocceius Nerva	Sergia Plautilla	P. Aelius Hadrianus
Titus (r. 79–81)	Marcia Furnilla	Marcia	Trajanus Pater	Nerva (r. 96–98)	Ulpia (Note: Sister of Trajan's father: Giacosa (1977), p. 7.)	Aelius Hadrianus Marullinus
Flavia (Note: Giacosa (1977), p. 8.)	Marciana (Note: Levick (2014), p. 161.)	C. Salonius Matidius (Note: Husband of Ulpia Marciana: Levick (2014), p. 161.)	Trajan (r. 98–117)	Plotina	P. Acilius Attianus	P. Aelius Afer (Note: Giacosa (1977), p. 7.)	Paulina Major (Note: DIR contributor (Herbert W. Benario, 2000), "Hadrian".)
Lucius Mindius (2)	Libo Rupilius Frugi (3)	Salonia Matidia (Note: Giacosa (1977), p. 9.)	L. Vibius Sabinus (1) (Note: Husband of Salonia Matidia: Levick (2014), p. 161.)
Paulina Minor	L. Julius Ursus Servianus (Note: Smith (1870), "Julius Servianus".)
Matidia Minor	Sabina	Hadrian (Note: Smith (1870), "Hadrian", pp. 319–322.) (r. 117–138)	Antinous (Note: Lover of Hadrian: Lambert (1984), p. 99 and passim; deification: Lambert (1984), pp. 2–5, etc.)
C. Fuscus Salinator I	Julia Serviana Paulina
M. Annius Verus (Note: Husband of Rupilia Faustina: Levick (2014), p. 163.)	Rupilia Faustina (Note: Levick (2014), p. 163.) (Note: It is uncertain whether Rupilia Faustina was Frugi's daughter by Salonia Matidia or another woman.)	Boionia Procilla	Cn. Arrius Antoninus
L. Ceionius Commodus	Appia Severa	C. Fuscus Salinator II
L. Caesennius Paetus	Arria Antonina	Arria Fadilla (Note: Levick (2014), p. 162.)	T. Aurelius Fulvus
L. Caesennius Antoninus	L. Commodus	Plautia	unknown (Note: Levick (2014), p. 164.)	C. Avidius Nigrinus
M. Annius Verus	Calvisia Domitia Lucilla (Note: Wife of M. Annius Verus: Giacosa (1977), p. 10.)	Fundania (Note: Wife of M. Annius Libo: Levick (2014), p. 163.)	M. Annius Libo	Faustina	Antoninus Pius (r. 138–161)	L. Aelius Caesar	Avidia
Cornificia	Marcus Aurelius (r. 161–180) (Note: Giacosa (1977), p. 10.)	Faustina Minor	Aurelia Fadilla	Lucius Verus (r. 161–169) (1)	Ceionia Fabia	Plautius Quintillus (Note: Husband of Ceionia Fabia: Levick (2014), p. 164.)	Q. Servilius Pudens	Ceionia Plautia
Cornificia Minor (Note: Levick (2014), p. 117.)	M. Petronius Sura	Commodus (r. 177–192)	Fadilla	M. Annius Verus Caesar	Ti. Claudius Pompeianus (2)	Lucilla	M. Plautius Quintillus	Junius Licinius Balbus	Servilia Ceionia
Petronius Antoninus	L. Aurelius Agaclytus (2)	Aurelia Sabina	L. Antistius Burrus (1)	Plautius Quintillus	Plautia Servilla	C. Furius Sabinus Timesitheus	Maecia Faustina	Junius Licinius Balbus?
Furia Sabinia Tranquillina	Gordian III (r. 238–244)

- (1) = 1st spouse
- (2) = 2nd spouse
- (3) = 3rd spouse
- Reddish-purple indicates emperor of the Nerva–Antonine dynasty
  lighter purple indicates designated imperial heir of said dynasty who never reigned
  grey indicates unsuccessful imperial aspirants
  bluish-purple indicates emperors of other dynasties
- dashed lines indicate adoption; dotted lines indicate love affairs/unmarried relationships
- Small Caps = posthumously deified (Augusti, Augustae, or other)

Notes:

Except where otherwise noted, the notes below indicate that an individual's parentage is as shown in the above family tree.

References:
- DIR contributors (2000). "De Imperatoribus Romanis: An Online Encyclopedia of Roman Rulers and Their Families".
- Giacosa, Giorgio (1977). Women of the Caesars: Their Lives and Portraits on Coins. Translated by Holloway, R. Ross. Milan: Edizioni Arte e Moneta. ISBN 0-8390-0193-2.
- Lambert, Royston (1984). Beloved and God: The Story of Hadrian and Antinous. New York: Viking. ISBN 0-670-15708-2.
- Levick, Barbara (2014). Faustina I and II: Imperial Women of the Golden Age. Oxford University Press. ISBN 978-0-19-537941-9.
- Smith, William, ed. (1870). Dictionary of Greek and Roman Biography and Mythology.

== Inscriptions ==
- CIL VI, 41120;
- CIL XVI, 127 = CIL 03, p 2328,72 = ILSard-01, 00182 = ZPE-133-279 = AE 1898, 00078 = AE 2008, +00022 = AE 2008, +00613;
- CIL III, 8484 = CIL 03, 01790a (p 2328,121) = CIL 03, 06362a = D 03381 = CINar-01, 00011a;
- ILTG, 239 (AE 1934, 96);
- Maybe Année Épigraphique AE 1971, 208 ( AE 1974, no. 411)
- PIR C 973

Military offices
Preceded by	Military Governor of Pannonia Inferior; 164–168	Succeeded by
Political offices
Preceded by Junius Rusticus, and Lucius Titius Plautius Aquilinus as suffect consuls	Consul of the Roman Empire; 162 with Tiberius Claudius Paullinus	Succeeded by Marcus Insteius Bithynicus, and ignotus as suffect consuls
Preceded by Sextus Calpurnius Scipio Orfitus, and Sextus Quintilius Maximus as ordinary consuls	Consul of the Roman Empire; 173 with Gnaeus Claudius Severus	Succeeded by Lucius Aurelius Gallus, and Quintus Volusius Flaccus Cornelianus as ordinary consuls
