= Battle of the Metaurus =

207 BC battle during the Second Punic War

- Part of the Second Punic War
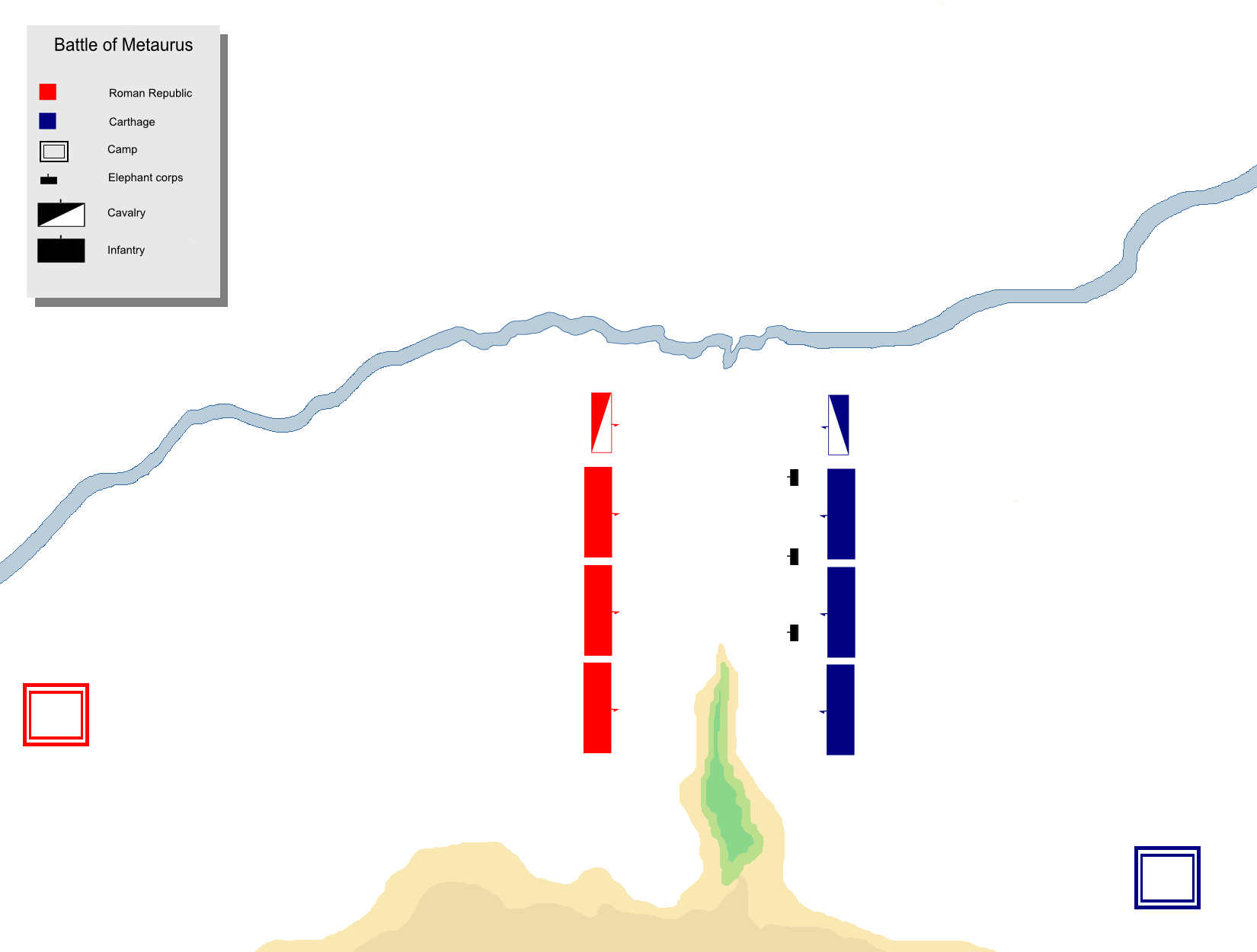
- Roman and Carthaginian battle lines
Date	24 June 207 BC
Location	Metaurus River, Marche, Italy 43.7824°N 13.0145°E
Result	Roman victory

Belligerents
Roman Republic	Carthage

Commanders and leaders
Marcus Livius; Gaius Claudius Nero; Lucius Porcius Licinus	Hasdrubal Barca †

Strength
37,000 men	30,000 men 10 elephants

Casualties and losses
2,000–8,000 killed	10,000 men killed 5,400 men captured 6 elephants killed 4 elephants captured
- Location within Italy

The Battle of the Metaurus was a pivotal battle in the Second Punic War between Rome and Carthage, fought in 207 BC near the Metauro River in Italy. The Carthaginians were led by Hasdrubal Barca, brother of Hannibal, who was to have brought siege equipment and reinforcements for Hannibal. The Roman armies were led by the consuls Marcus Livius, who was later nicknamed the Salinator, and Gaius Claudius Nero.

Claudius Nero had just fought Hannibal in Grumentum, some hundreds of kilometres south of the Metaurus river, and reached Marcus Livius by a forced march that went unnoticed by both Hannibal and Hasdrubal, so that the Carthaginians suddenly found themselves outnumbered. In the battle, the Romans used their numerical superiority to outflank the Carthaginian army and rout them, the Carthaginians losing 15,400 men killed or captured, including Hasdrubal.

The battle confirmed Roman supremacy over Italy. Without Hasdrubal's army to support him, Hannibal was compelled to evacuate pro-Carthaginian towns in much of southern Italy in the face of Roman pressure and withdraw to Bruttium, where he would remain for the next four years.

== Background ==
Hasdrubal's invasion of Italy

Hasdrubal's campaign to come to his brother's aid in Italy had gone remarkably well up to that point. After adeptly escaping Publius Scipio in Baecula, recruiting mercenary contingents in Celtiberia and making his way into Gaul in the winter of 208, Hasdrubal waited until the spring of 207 to make his way through the Alps and into Northern Italy. Hasdrubal made much faster progress than his brother had during his crossing, partly due to the constructions left behind by Hannibal's army a decade earlier, but also due to the removal of the Gallic threat that had plagued Hannibal during that expedition. The Gauls now feared and respected the Carthaginians, and not only was Hasdrubal allowed to pass through the Alps unmolested, his ranks were swelled by many enthusiastic Gauls. Hasdrubal, in the same fashion as his brother, succeeded in bringing his war elephants, raised and trained in Hispania, over the Alps.

Rome was still reeling from the series of devastating defeats by Hannibal ten years earlier, and the Romans were terrified at the prospect of fighting two sons of "the Thunderbolt" (a rough translation of Hamilcar Barca's surname) at once. The hastily elected consuls Claudius Nero and Marcus Livius were dispatched to face Hannibal and Hasdrubal respectively. Neither consul engaged his intended target initially. Claudius Nero's force of over 40,000 men was too formidable for Hannibal to engage openly, and so the two played an unproductive game of cat and mouse in Bruttium; meanwhile, Marcus Livius, despite the added bulwark of two of the many Roman armies scattered across Italy, yielded cautiously to Hasdrubal, and allowed him to push beyond the Metaurus as far south as the town of Sena, today Senigallia.

== Prelude ==
It was not until Hasdrubal sent messengers to Hannibal that decisive measures were finally taken. Hasdrubal wished to meet with his brother in southern Umbria. Hasdrubal's messengers were captured, and his plans fell into the hands of the consul Claudius Nero. Recognizing the urgency of the situation and the enormous threat that a merging of the Carthaginian brothers' armies would present to Rome, Nero decided to circumvent the authority of the Senate, also advising them to organize levies for their own protection. Leaving his camp under the command of his legate Quintus Catius, he then marched quickly to the North with 7,000 selected men, 1,000 of whom were cavalry, in order to join up with Marcus Livius. Horsemen were sent forward along the line of march with orders for country people to prepare supplies for soldiers, who took only weapons from the camp. Nero's troops were joined by both young and veteran volunteers during the march.

Claudius Nero quickly reached Marcus Livius, who was camped at Sena along with the praetor Porcius Licinius. Hasdrubal was camped approximately a half-mile to the north. Because Claudius Nero had conveniently arrived at night, his presence was not detected until the next day, when the Romans drew themselves up for battle. Hasdrubal drew his army up as well, but upon closer observation of the forces assembled before him, noticed that Marcus Livius' army seemed to have grown considerably over the course of the night, and that he had a much larger contingent of cavalry. Hasdrubal remembered hearing a second trumpet in the Roman camp heralding the arrival of an important figure the night before—a sound with which he had become familiar during his entanglements with the Romans in Hispania—and correctly concluded that he was now facing two Roman armies. Fearing defeat, he retreated from the field.

The rest of the day passed without event. When nightfall came, Hasdrubal quietly led his army out of his camp with the intent of retreating into Gaul, where he could safely establish communications with Hannibal. Early on in the march, Hasdrubal's guides betrayed him, and left him lost and confused along the banks of the Metaurus, searching futilely for a ford at which to cross.

The night passed with no change in Hasdrubal's misfortunes, and the morning found his army disarrayed, deprived of sleep, and trapped against the banks of the Metaurus, with a great many of his Gallic troops drunk. With Roman cavalry fast approaching and the legions under the two consuls not far behind, Hasdrubal reluctantly prepared for battle.

== Opposing forces ==
The battle was fought on the banks of the Metaurus River, near Montemaggiore al Metauro. The exact numbers of troops on both sides are not known. The Romans estimated 8,000 Ligurians in Hasdrubal's army, making up one-third of his infantry. The data given by the ancient sources are often either insufficient or very contradictory. Appian for instance says that the Carthaginian force numbered 48,000 infantry, 8,000 cavalry, and 15 elephants. Livy claims that there were 61,400 slain or captured Carthaginian soldiers at the end of the battle and there were still more who escaped the slaughter.

These figures look inflated, especially given that Polybius estimated only 10,000 Carthaginian and Gallic dead. Modern estimates suggest Hasdrubal's army was about 30,000 in strength, and Marcus Livius' army of roughly equal numbers. The propraetor L. Porcius Licinius commanded two legions—as many men as the consul. This means that Marcus Livius and Porcius Licinius had between them four legions, i.e. 32,000–40,000 men, including their allies. The numbers of the allied contingents could have been less than usual due to the refusal of some of the Roman clients to provide auxiliaries. Porcius' legions were under-strength. The Roman force was probably further diminished by earlier fighting with Hasdrubal, the evidence of which is the presence of 3,000 prisoners in Hasdrubal's camp. Claudius Nero's 7,000 troops were joined by perhaps 2,000 volunteers en route, and upon his arrival the Romans had 37,000 men concentrated against Hasdrubal.

Like most Carthaginian armies, Hasdrubal's was a mix of many different cultures and ethnicities, including Hispanics, Ligures, Gauls, and a few were of African origin. Hasdrubal's right flank was on the River Metaurus and his left flank was inaccessible hilly terrain. He placed his cavalry on his right wing to guard it against the superior Roman cavalry that could outflank him. Contrary to this, Hasdrubal's left flank was well guarded by hills to the left and ravines in front. Hasdrubal's best troops were his Hispanic veterans, who he put in a deep formation on his right flank. The centre was composed of Ligures, also deployed in deep ranks. Finally, on his left, he placed the tired Gauls on a hilltop, shielded by the deep ravine in front of them. Hasdrubal also had ten elephants, which he put up front. He had introduced an innovation in elephant warfare, equipping their mahouts with hammers and chisels to kill the beasts if they ever turned against their own troops, as it was frequent.

Marcus Livius Salinator deployed the Roman army in front of the Carthaginian force. The Roman left wing was commanded by Marcus Livius, the right wing was under Gaius Claudius Nero, facing the inaccessible Gauls, and the centre was under the command of Porcius Licinius. The Roman cavalry was placed on the left wing, facing the Carthaginian cavalry.

== Battle ==
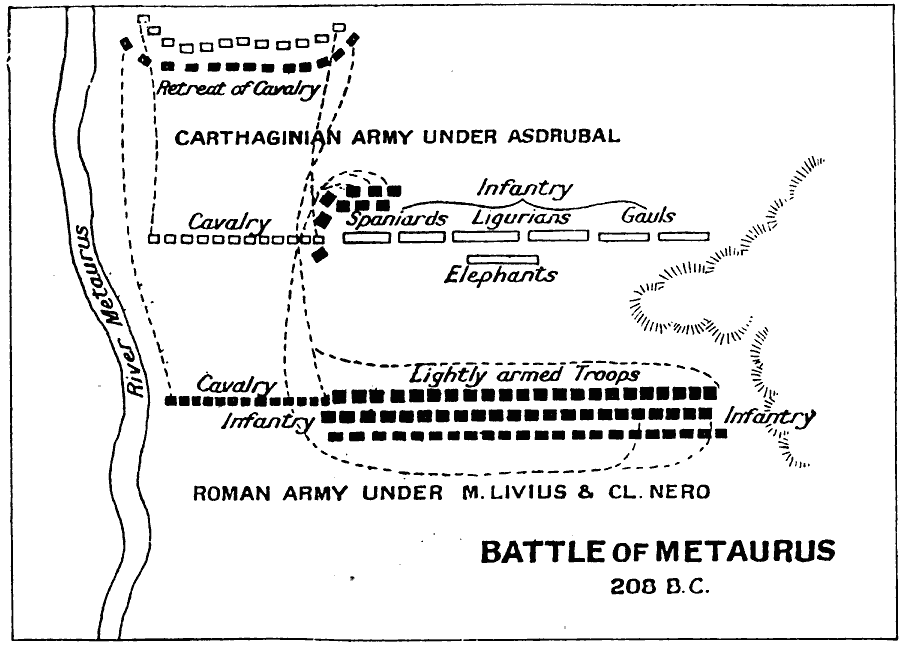
The battle

The battle started with the Roman left flank charging the Carthaginian right, followed a little later by the advance of the Roman centre. The outnumbered Carthaginian cavalry tumbled against the Roman cavalry. The Carthaginian right wing and centre held their ground and the war elephants succeeded in breaking the Roman lines and spreading mass confusion.

Claudius Nero, on the Roman right flank, struggled to overcome the terrain that blocked his path to the unwary Gauls on Hasdrubal's left. Seeing the futility in wasting further time attempting to reach the inert Gauls, he instead took half of his men in cohorts and led them from behind the battling Roman lines to the extreme Roman left, swinging his troops around and crashing into the Carthaginian right flank with sudden force and intensity. The Carthaginian right wing, composed of Hispanics, could not withstand this two pronged attack of Marcus Livius from the front and Claudius Nero on their flank. They were forced to fall back, taking the Ligures in the Carthaginian centre with them. The elephants were running amok, killing Romans and Carthaginians alike. Hasdrubal fought alongside his men and exhorted them to keep fighting, rallying fleeing soldiers and re-starting the battle wherever he was present.

The Gauls on the Carthaginian left now faced a three pronged attack: Porcius Licinius from the front, Marcus Livius from their right flank, and Claudius Nero from the rear. By now, the Roman cavalry had completely defeated the Carthaginian cavalry and, with the retreat of the Carthaginian left wing, a general retreat of Hasdrubal's army started. Six of the elephants were killed by their own drivers to stop their rampages and the remaining four were captured by the Romans.

Hasdrubal, seeing that there was nothing more he could do, and presumably doubtful of his own prospects of escape or simply unwilling to be taken captive, charged into the Roman ranks on his horse along with his remnant Hispanic guards and was killed. He was praised by Polybius and Livy for having done all he could as a general and then meeting a glorious death. Dexter Hoyos believes Hasdrubal's death was foolish, as he could have given organisation and leadership to the remnants of the Carthaginian army and posed a lingering threat to Rome in northern Italy. An unknown number of Ligurians and Gauls, possibly 10,000 or so, who either escaped the battle or didn't take part at all formed into an organised body but dispersed afterwards for want of a general. At least one Carthaginian officer, Hamilcar, refused to give up after Hasdrubal's defeat and organized a Cisalpine Gallic army of 40,000 men against the Romans in 200 BC, causing the Battle of Cremona.

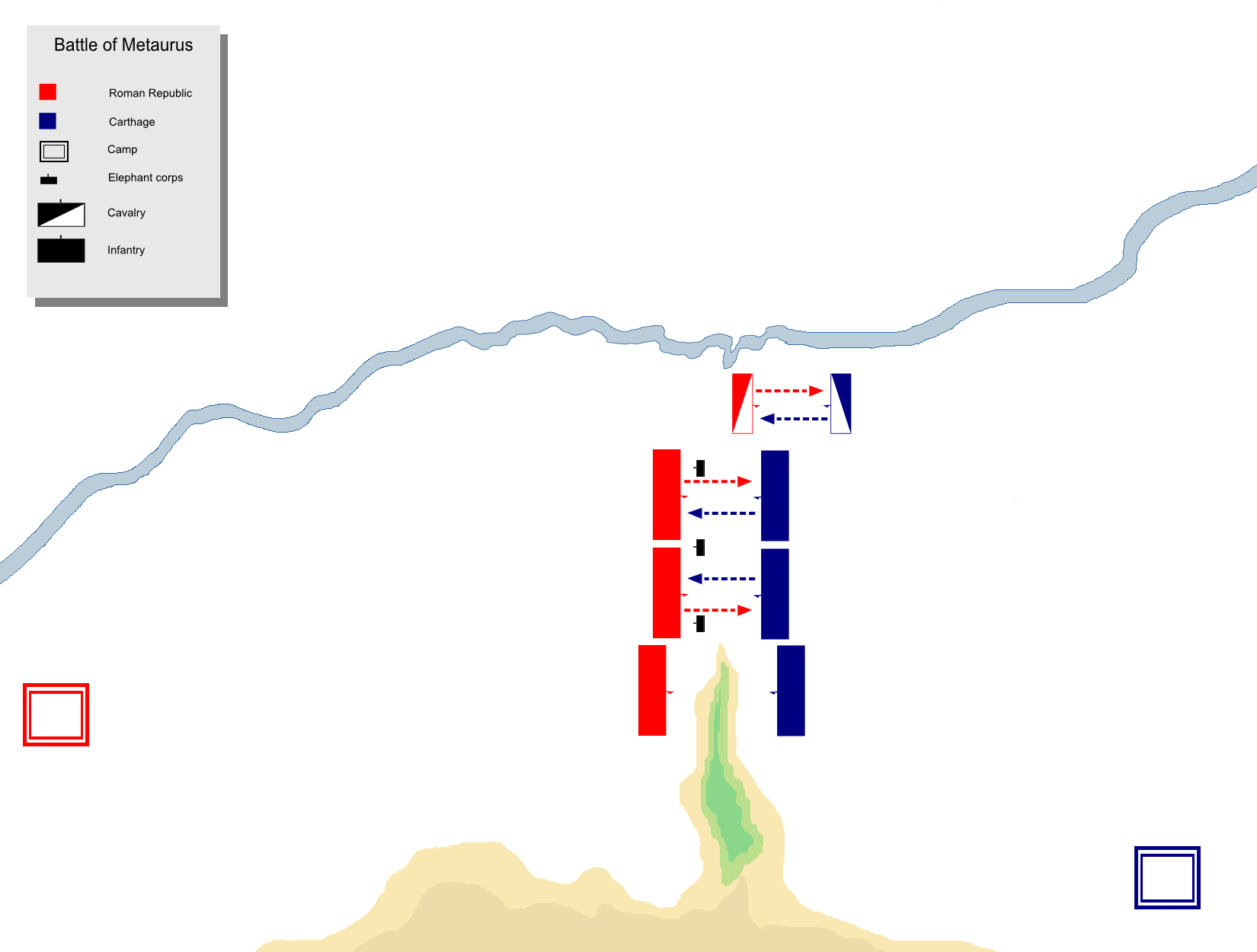
Roman left wing, center and cavalry charging the respective Carthaginian forces

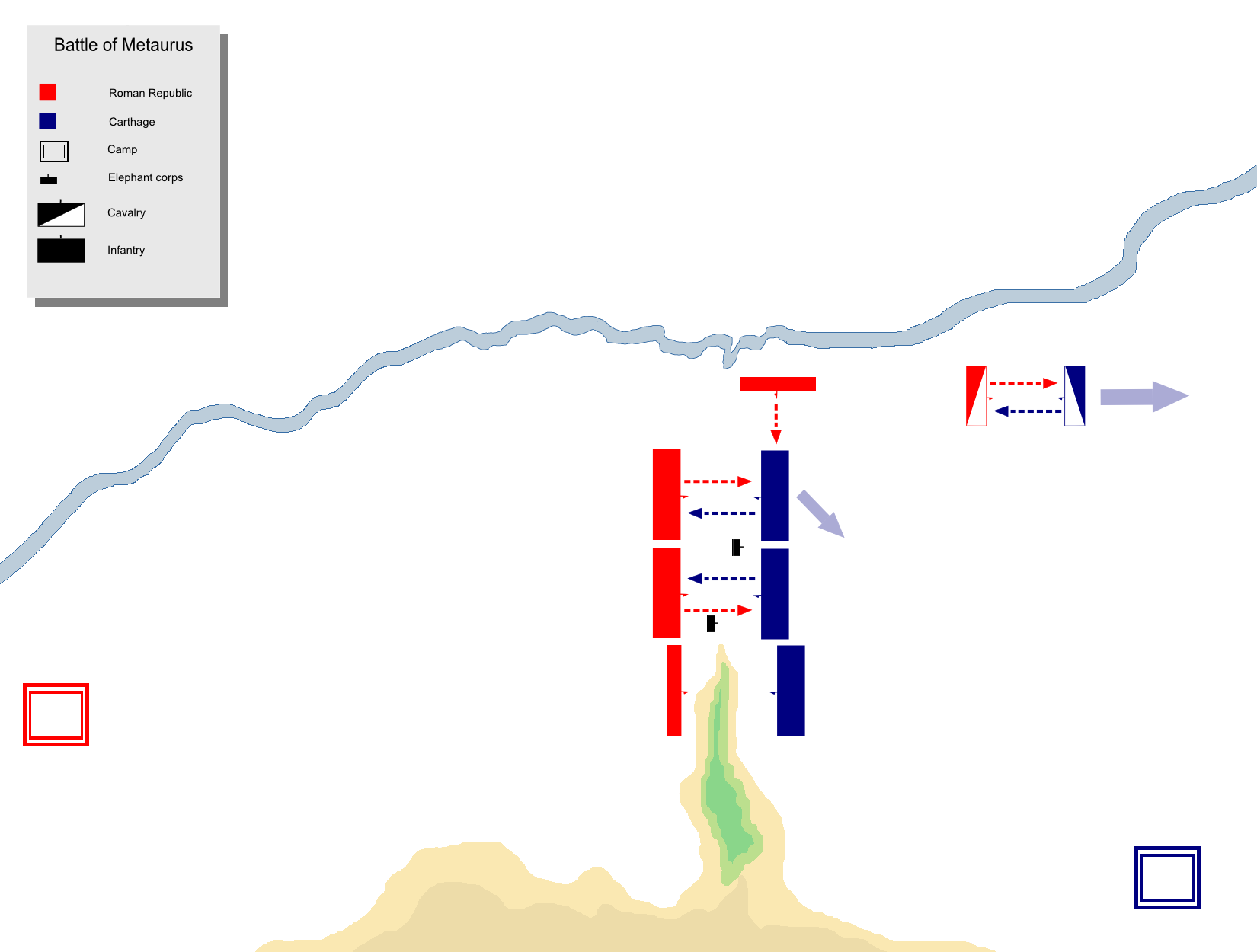
Claudius Nero attacking the Carthaginian right wing at its flank, left unprotected by retreating cavalry

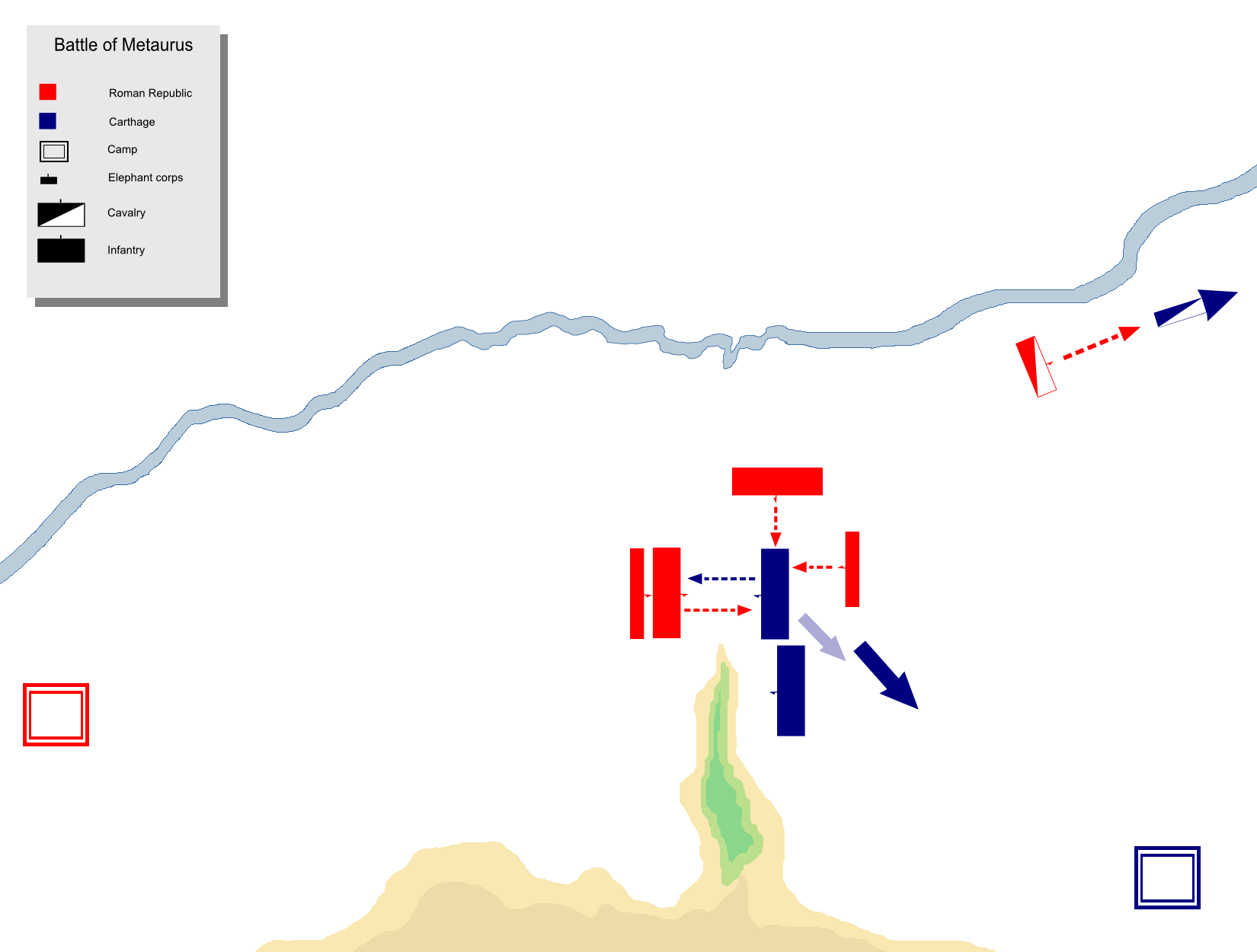
Carthaginian right wing and cavalry routed followed by a three prong attack on Carthaginian center

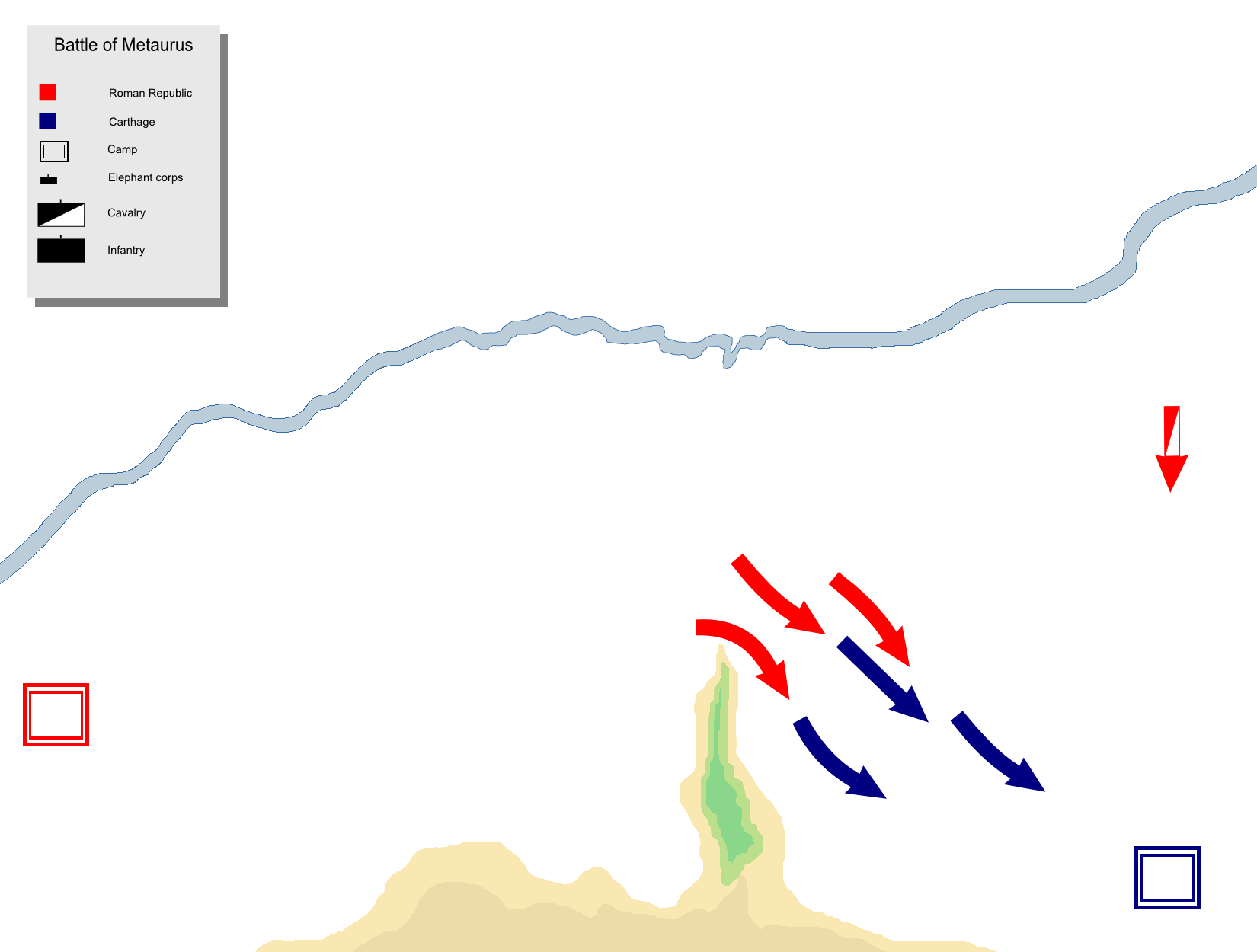
Retreat of the entire Carthaginian army

== Aftermath ==
Claudius Nero showed no respect for his fallen adversary. He had Hasdrubal's head severed from his body, taken south, and thrown into Hannibal's camp as a token of his brother's defeat.

Lord Byron wrote of the battle:

The consul Claudius Nero, who made the unequalled march which deceived Hannibal and deceived Hasdrubal, thereby accomplishing an achievement almost unrivaled in military annals. The first intelligence of his return, to Hannibal, was the sight of Hasdrubal's head thrown into his camp. When Hannibal saw this, he exclaimed, with a sigh, that 'Rome would now be the mistress of the world.' To this victory of Claudius Nero's it might be owing that his imperial namesake reigned at all. But the infamy of the one has eclipsed the glory of the other. When the name of Claudius Nero is heard, who thinks of the consul? But such are human things.

The significance of the Battle of the Metaurus is recognized amongst historians. It is included in Edward Shepherd Creasy's The Fifteen Decisive Battles of the World (1851), the rationale being that it effectively removed the Carthaginian threat from Rome's ascendancy to continental dominion by leaving Hannibal stranded in Italy. Paul K. Davis sees its importance as the "Carthaginian defeat ended the attempt to reinforce Hannibal, dooming his effort in Italy, and Rome was able to establish dominance over Spain." The Battle of the Metaurus is overshadowed by other battles of the Second Punic War, such as Hannibal's great victory at the Battle of Cannae or his ultimate defeat at the Battle of Zama. Nonetheless, the effects of Claudius Nero and Marcus Livius' victory at the Metaurus have earned it a significant standing amongst historians; not only of the history of Rome, but in that of the entire world.

One of Hasdrubal's officers, a certain Hamilcar, stayed behind in Cisalpine Gaul after the defeat and organized a united Gallic army of 40,000 men against Rome in 200 BC, sacking the city of Placentia before being defeated and killed by Rome at the Battle of Cremona. On the other hand, a part of the surviving Hispanic mercenaries continued the journey and eventually reached Hannibal.

=== Casualties ===
Polybius gave 10,000 killed for Hasdrubal's army and an unspecified number of prisoners. Six elephants were killed and four captured. The Romans lost 2,000 killed. Livy estimates 8,000 Roman and allied killed, possibly not contradicting Polybius, with the Carthaginians losing 56,000 killed and 5,400 captured. Livy's figure for prisoners is generally accepted by modern historians, but the number of Carthaginian deaths is not taken seriously. Total Carthaginian casualties were probably around 15,400, including 10,000 killed and 5,400 captured. A large number of Carthaginian officers were killed and many of the rest captured.

== In literature ==
F. L. Lucas's short story "The Fortune of Carthage" (Athenaeum, 28 January 1921) is about the battle's prelude, from Claudius Nero's viewpoint. It focuses on the dilemma the Roman consul faced in Apulia on intercepting Hasdrubal's letter to Hannibal. The closing section gives Hannibal's perspective in the aftermath of the battle. The story was admired by T. E. Lawrence.

== See also ==
- Monte Nerone

== Sources ==
=== Classical writers ===
- Appian: Roman History Archived 2015-11-20 at the Wayback Machine
- Cassius Dio. The Roman History at Project Gutenberg (print: Penguin Books, 1987, ISBN 0-140-44448-3)
- Eutropius: Roman History
- Florus (1889). Epitome of Roman History . Translated by John Selby Watson. London: George Bell & Sons – via Wikisource.
- Frontinus: The Strategemata
- Livy (1905). From the Founding of the City . Translated by Canon Roberts – via Wikisource. (print: Book 1 as The Rise of Rome, Oxford University Press, 1998, ISBN 0-19-282296-9)
- Polybius: The Rise of the Roman Empire at LacusCurtius (print: Harvard University Press, 1927. (Translation by W. R. Paton))
- Valerius Maximus: Nine Books of Memorable Deeds and Sayings, Bk. VII

=== Modern writers ===
- Edward Shepherd Creasy. The Fifteen Decisive Battles of the World: from Marathon to Waterloo at Project Gutenberg
- Bernard W. Henderson, The Campaign of the Metaurus English Historical Review Vol. 13 (1898), pp. 417–38, 625–42
- Hoyos, Dexter (2003). Hannibal's Dynasty: Power and politics in the western Mediterranean, 247–183 BC. London: Routledge. ISBN 0-203-41782-8.
- Olmi, Massimo (2020). La battaglia del Metauro. Alla ricerca del luogo dello scontro. Roma: Edizioni Chillemi. ISBN 978-88-99374-53-2.
- Hoyos, Dexter (2015). Mastering the West: Rome and Carthage at War. Oxford: Oxford University Press. ISBN 978-0-19-986010-4.
- https://penelope.uchicago.edu/Thayer/E/Roman/Texts/Polybius/11*.html

Polybios: The Histories, Book 11
p. 235, Text n.3 (3.)"Not fewer than ten thousand Carthaginians and Gauls fell in the battle, while the Roman loss amounted to two thousand. Some of the Carthaginians of distinction were captured and the rest were slain."
