= Titus Quinctius Crispinus =

Roman consul 209 BC

Titus Quinctius Crispinus was a Roman politician in the third century BC.

== Career ==
During the Second Punic War, in 213/212 BC, Quinctius served in the army that besieged Syracuse. In 209 BC, he was elected praetor. In 211 BC, he fought in the Siege of Capua, where his involvement was immortalized with an anecdote by Livy in which he defeated the Capuan Badius in single combat.

In 208 BC, Quinctius was elected consul together with Marcus Claudius Marcellus as his colleague. The consuls marched to Venosa, where they were soundly defeated by the Carthaginians. Marcellus died during the battle.

Quinctius died later that year from severe wounds, either in Campania or Taranto, after he had appointed the dictator to hold elections.
