= Legatus Augusti pro praetore =

Provincial governors in the Roman Empire

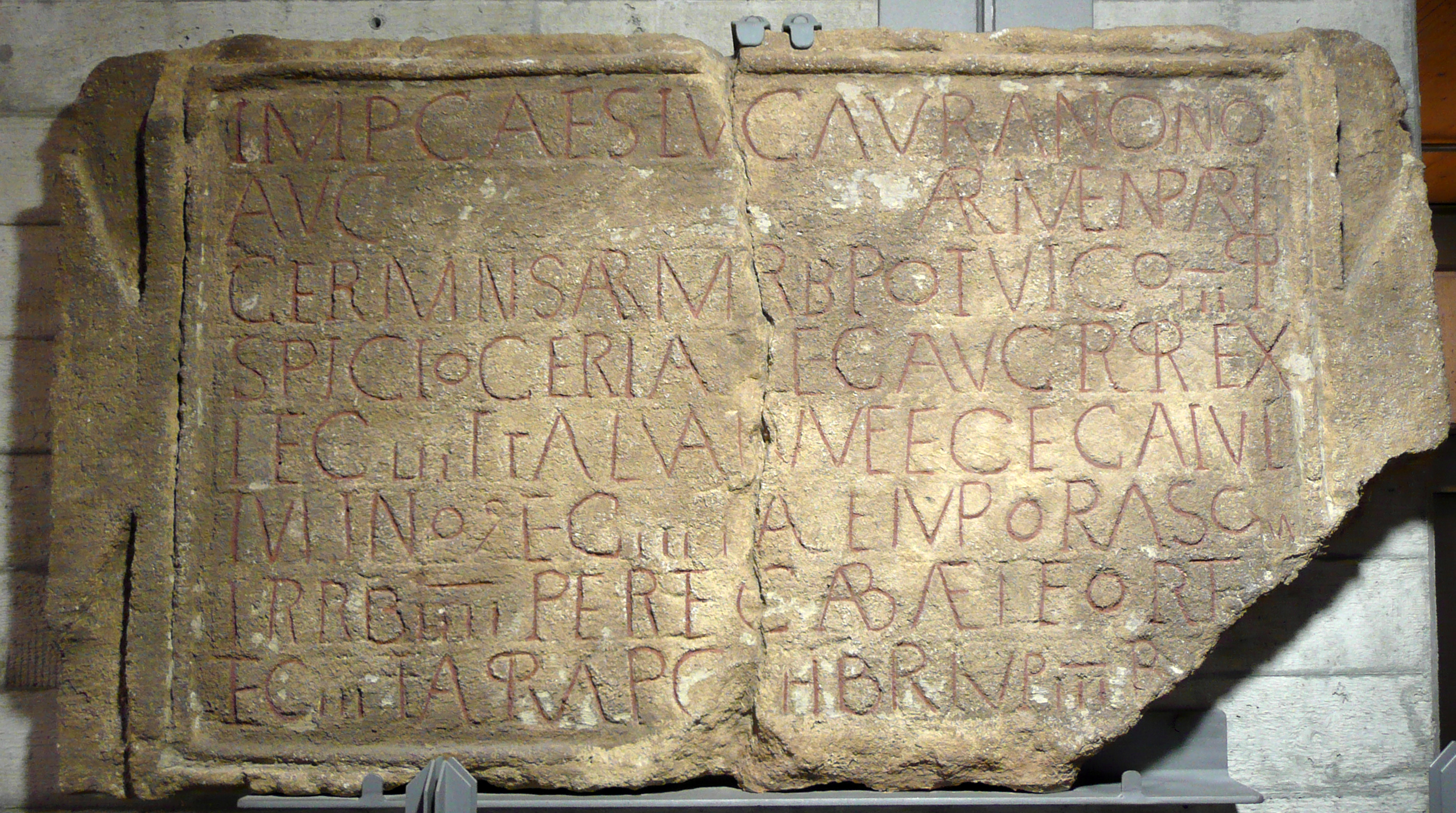
Molding from the inscription in the Kastell Böhming, Kipfenberg, Bavaria

A legatus Augusti pro praetore (lit. 'envoy of the emperor – acting for the praetor') was the official title of the governor or general of some Imperial provinces of the Roman Empire during the Principate era, normally the larger ones or those where legions were based. Provinces were denoted imperial if their governor was selected by the emperor, in contrast to senatorial provinces, whose governors (called proconsuls) were elected by the Roman Senate.

A legatus Augusti was always a senator of consular or praetorian rank (i.e., who had previously held the office of consul or praetor). However, the position of the governor of Egypt (praefectus Aegypti) was unparalleled, for though an eques (a member of a social class between plebeian and patrician) he had legions under his command. Some smaller imperial provinces where no legions were based (e.g. Mauretania, Thrace, Rhaetia, Noricum, and Judaea) were administered by equestrian praefecti (prefects) later designated procuratores (procurators) who commanded only auxiliary forces. The legatus Augusti was both the head of the provincial administration, chief judicial officer and commander-in-chief of all military forces based in the province (legions and auxiliaries). The only function outside the remit of the legatus was finance (the collection of imperial taxes and revenues), which was handled by an independent procurator, who reported direct to the emperor.

In the military hierarchy, the legatus' direct subordinates were the legati legionis (the commanders of the legions based in the province), who in turn commanded the tribuni militum (the legion's senior staff officers) and the praefecti (commanders) of the auxiliary regiments attached to the legion.

In AD 68, 15 out of a total of 36 provinces were ruled by legati Augusti: Hispania Tarraconensis, Lusitania, Gallia Aquitania, Gallia Lugdunensis, Gallia Belgica, Britannia, Germania Inferior, Germania Superior, Moesia, Dalmatia, Galatia, Cappadocia, Lycia et Pamphylia, Syria, and Numidia.

== See also ==
- Political institutions of ancient Rome
