= Archidamus =

Archidamus may refer to:

- one of several kings of Sparta:
  - Archidamus I (c. 600–575 BC)
  - Archidamus II (469–427 BC)
  - Archidamus III (360–338 BC)
  - Archidamus IV (305–275 BC)
  - Archidamus V (228–227 BC)
- Archidamus (speech), a speech of Isocrates written in the voice of Archidamus III
- Archidamus (physician), an ancient Greek doctor quoted by Galen who lived in the 4th or 5th century BCE
- Archedemus (disambiguation), a name commonly interchanged with Archidamus in the ancient world
