= Charilaus =

8th-century BCE King of Sparta

Charilaus (Ancient Greek: Χαρίλαος), also spelled Charilaos, Charillos, or Charillus, was a king of Sparta in the middle of the 8th century BC. He was probably the first historical king of the Eurypontid dynasty.

== Life and reign ==
Sparta was a diarchy, with two kings of equal powers from distinct dynasties. However, in its earliest history, Sparta was likely ruled by only one king, from the Agiad dynasty. In the 8th century, a synoecism occurred on the site of Sparta, where four villages merged to create the polis of Sparta. At this occasion, two of the villages (Limnai and Kynosoura) probably requested to also have a king from their territory sharing power with the Agiad one, who was based in the other two villages (Pitana and Mesoa). In later times, the Spartans crafted a mythical story making the second dynasty—the Eurypontids—as old as the Agiads, notably by inventing several kings to make the two dynasties symmetrical. Modern scholars consider instead that Charilaus was the first historical Eurypontid king. Charilaus and the Agiad Archelaus are indeed the first kings of Sparta mentioned together in ancient sources, a good indication that they were the first pair of kings formed after the synoecism.

The dates of his reign are nevertheless conjectural and disputed. Paul Cartledge dates his reign from c.775–c.760, W. G. Forrest and Joseph Fontenrose from c.775–c.750, but Victor Parker places it a generation later in c.750–c.725.

During the joint reign of Charilaus and Archelaus, Sparta conquered the Aigys, an area in the northwest of Laconia, on the border with Tegea. This event is principally known thanks to an oracle from the Pythia of Delphi. The oracle reads: "If they divide a half share of the additional portion for Apollo, it will be much better for them." The oracle is considered genuine by modern scholars, as it is very simple without the elaboration typical of later forgers. Moreover, it was given at a time when Delphi was gaining international credibility within the Greek world (mainly for colonisation enterprises) and started a special relationship with Sparta. The oracle tells that the kings should devote half of the land taken from Aigys to Apollo. Writing in the 2nd century AD, the geographer Pausanias precisely mentions that there was a temple of Apollo Cereatas in the area, a further indication of the oracle's authenticity. If genuine, this oracle would be the oldest known from Delphi.

Pausanias also embellished Charilaus' reign by saying that Sparta's expansion was blocked in the south by the resistance of Amyklai, therefore prompting the conquest of Aigys in the north. Paul Cartledge however dismisses this story as "worthless", because Sparta would have never attacked Aigys with Amyklai so close to its southern borders. He suggests instead that Amyklai was conquered in the earliest times of Sparta, in the 10th or 9th centuries.

According to Pausanias, Charilaus was the successor of his father Polydectes.

Charilaus is best known as the ward and nephew of the Spartan reformer Lycurgus. During his reign, the Spartans invaded Argolis. The long-standing hostility with Tegea is also believed to date from Charilaus' reign.

Charilaus was succeeded by his son Nicander, the father of Theopompus.

== Bibliography ==
=== Ancient sources ===
- Pausanias, Description of Greece.
- Plutarch, Parallel Lives (Lycurgus).

=== Modern sources ===
- Paul Cartledge, Sparta and Lakonia, A Regional History 1300–362 BC, London, Routledge, 2002 (originally published in 1979). ISBN 0-415-26276-3
- W. G. Forrest, A History of Sparta, New York, Norton, 1986. SBN 393004813
- Joseph Fontenrose, The Delphic Oracle, Its Responses and Operations, with a Catalogue of Responses, Berkeley, University of California Press, 1978. ISBN 0-520-03360-4
- Herbert William Parke, D. E. W. Wormell, The Delphic Oracle: The History, Oxford, Blackwell, 1956.
- Victor Parker, "Some Dates In Early Spartan History", Klio, 75, 1993, pp. 45–60.

Preceded by Eunomus	Eurypontid King of Sparta c. 780–c. 750	Succeeded by Nicander
