= Eurypon =

King of Sparta

Eurypon, otherwise called Eurytion (Ancient Greek: Εὐρυπῶν, Εὐρυτίων), son of Soos and grandson of Procles, was the third king of that house at Sparta, and thenceforward gave it the name of Eurypontidae.

Plutarch talks of his having relaxed the kingly power, and played the demagogue; and Polyaenus relates a war with the Arcadians of Mantineia under his command. He was succeeded by his son Prytanis, the father of Polydectes, in turn father of Eunomus (father of Charilaus) and Lycurgus.

== Notes ==
Preceded by Soos	Eurypontid King of Sparta ?–890 BC	Succeeded by Prytanis
