= 800s BC (decade) =

Decade

800 BC in various calendars
Gregorian calendar	800 BC; DCCC BC
Ancient Egypt era	XXIII dynasty, 81
Ancient Greek Olympiad (summer)	24 before 1st Olympiad
Assyrian calendar	3951
Balinese saka calendar	N/A
Bengali calendar	−1393 – −1392
Berber calendar	151
Buddhist calendar	−255
Burmese calendar	−1437
Byzantine calendar	4709–4710
Chinese calendar	庚子年 (Metal Rat); 1898 or 1691 — to — 辛丑年 (Metal Ox); 1899 or 1692
Coptic calendar	−1083 – −1082
Discordian calendar	367
Ethiopian calendar	−807 – −806
Hebrew calendar	2961–2962
- Hindu calendars
Vikram Samvat	−743 – −742
Shaka Samvat	N/A
Kali Yuga	2301–2302
Holocene calendar	9201
Iranian calendar	1421 BP – 1420 BP
Islamic calendar	1465 BH – 1464 BH
Javanese calendar	N/A
Julian calendar	N/A
Korean calendar	1534
Minguo calendar	2711 before ROC 民前2711年
Nanakshahi calendar	−2267
Thai solar calendar	−257 – −256
Tibetan calendar	ལྕགས་ཕོ་བྱི་བ་ལོ་ (male Iron-Rat) −673 or −1054 or −1826 — to — ལྕགས་མོ་གླང་ལོ་ (female Iron-Ox) −672 or −1053 or −1825

This article concerns the period 809 BC – 800 BC.

== Events and trends ==
- 804 BC—Adad-nirari III of Assyria led a campaign into Syria and Palestine, reaching Gaza.
- c. 800 BC—Greek Dark Ages end.
- c. 800 BC—Archaic period in Greece begins. (It ends in 480 BC with the invasion of Xerxes.)
- From c. 800 BC – The Upanishads are composed.
- c. 800 BC–700 BC—Pre-Etruscan period in Italy.
- Etruscan civilization.
- The Olmecs build pyramids.
- 800 BC—End of the reign of Polydectes, king of Sparta from 830 BC.
- 800 BC—Beginning of the reign of Eunomus, king of Sparta until 780 BC.
- 800 BC—Emergence of the first communities settled in the Chincha Valley (Peru), pertaining to Paracas culture in the south coast of Peru.
- c. 800 BC—End of Period IVB, Hasanlu (Iran) is completely destroyed by a fire.
- c. 800 BC—The Greek Colonization of the Mediterranean & Black Sea.
- c. 800 BC—Homer of Greece writes his Iliad and Odyssey. ( - 700 BCE)
- c. 800 BC—Assyrian army makes a use of the new technology by which iron can be hardened into steel suitable for weapons.
- c. 800 BC—Earliest surviving sundial is in use in Egypt.
- c. 800 BC—Beginning of Iron Age in Britain (until 43 AD).
- c. 800 BC—pharmaceutical production area active at Heraion Teikhos, Thrace.

== Deaths ==
- 804 BC—Duke Wen of Qi, ruler of the state of Qi
- 804 BC—Pedubastis I, pharaoh
- 800 BC—Xiong Xun, monarch of the state of Chu during the Western Zhou dynasty of ancient China.
- c. 800 BC—Hasanlu Lovers, pair of human remains found at Teppe Hasanlu, possibly a couple.

== Gallery ==
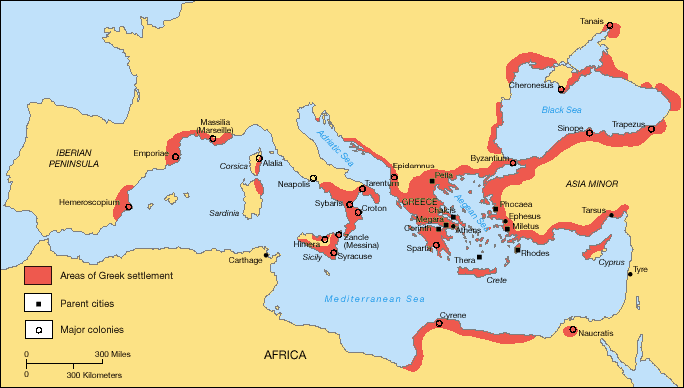
Greek colonisation in the Archaic period.

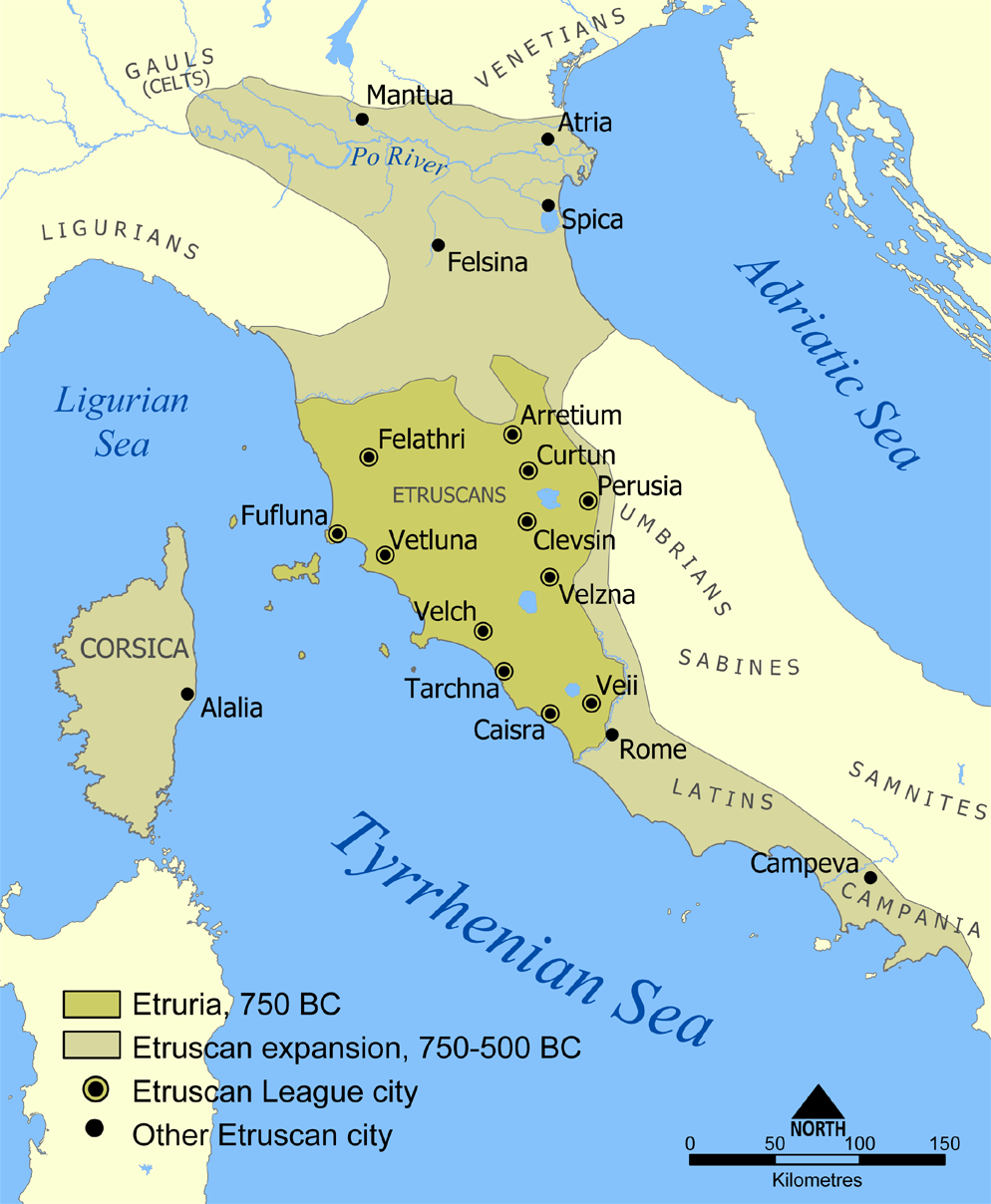
Etruscan civilization map.

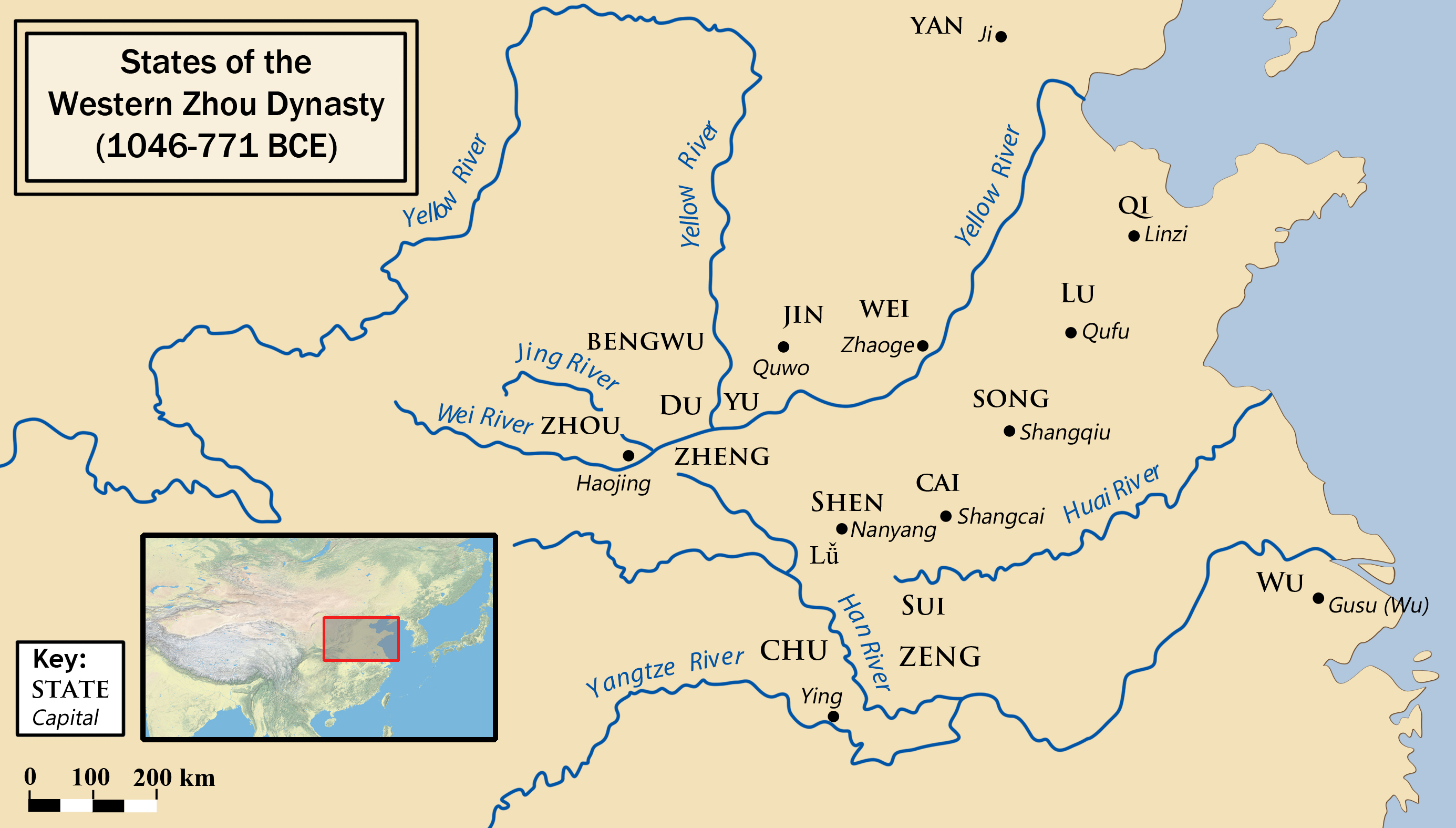
Western Zhou States Map.
