= Melesippus =

Melesippus (Ancient Greek: Μελήσιππος), son of Diacritus, was one of three Spartan envoys sent to Athens in 432 BC, shortly before the outbreak of the Peloponnesian War. The embassy consisted of Rhamphias, Melesippus, and Agesander, and its mission was to present Sparta's final demand that Athens restore independence to all Greek city-states. Acting on the advice of Pericles, the Athenians rejected these demands.

The following year, as King Archidamus advanced toward Attica, Melesippus was sent again to Athens in hopes of opening negotiations, but this time the Athenians refused even to grant him an audience. As he was escorted to the frontier and dismissed, Melesippus reportedly declared that this day would mark the beginning of great misfortunes for the Greeks.
