= Cynosura =

Cynosura or Kynosoura (Ancient Greek: Κυνόσουρα, lit. 'dog's tail') may refer to:

- Cynosura (Laconia), a settlement that coalesced into ancient Sparta
- Cynosura (Salamis), a promontory of Salamis Island
- the Greek name of Ursa Minor
- Cynosura (nymph), a mountain nymph in Greek mythology
