= Pitana =

Pitana may refer to:

- Néstor Pitana, Argentinian actor
- Pitana (Laconia), a town in ancient Laconia, Greece

== See also ==
- Pitane (disambiguation)
