= Leotychidas II =

Eurypontid king of Sparta from 491 to 476 BC

Leotychidas II (Ancient Greek: Λεωτυχίδας; Doric: Λατυχίδας Latychidas; c. 545 – c. 469 BC) was king of Sparta from 491–476 BC, alongside Cleomenes I and later Leonidas I and Pleistarchus. He led Spartan forces during the Persian Wars from 490–478 BC.

Born in Sparta around 545 BC, Leotychidas was a descendant of the Royal House of the Eurypontids (through Menamus, Agesilaus, Hippocratides, Leotychides, Anaxilaus, Archidamos, Anaxandridas I and Theopompus) and came to power in 491 BC with the help of the Agiad King Cleomenes I by challenging the legitimacy of the birth of Demaratus for the Eurypontid throne of Sparta. Later that year, he joined Cleomenes's second expedition to Aegina, where ten hostages were seized and given to Athens. However, after Cleomenes's death in 488 BC, Leotychidas was almost surrendered to Aegina.

In the spring of 479 BC, following the death of his co-ruler Leonidas at the Battle of Thermopylae, Leotychidas commanded a Greek fleet consisting of 110 ships at Aegina and later at Delos, supporting the Greek revolts at Chios and Samos against Persia. Leotychidas defeated Persian military and naval forces at the Battle of Mycale on the coast of Asia Minor in the summer of 479 BC (possibly around mid-August). In 476 BC, Leotychidas led an expedition to Thessaly against the Aleuadae family for collaboration with the Persians but withdrew after being bribed by the family. Upon returning to Sparta he was tried for bribery, and fled to the temple of Athena Alea in Tegea. He was sentenced to exile and his house burned. He was succeeded by his grandson, Archidamus II, son of his son Zeuxidamus, called Cyniscus, who had died in his father's lifetime. Leotychidas died some years later, around 469 BC.

Preceded by Demaratus	Eurypontid King of Sparta c. 491 BC – 476 BC	Succeeded by Archidamus II
