= Archidamus I =

6th-century BC Spartan king

Archidamus I, also spelled Archidamos I (Ancient Greek: Ἀρχίδαμος Α΄), was a king of Sparta, 12th of the Eurypontids. He reigned from c. 660 to c. 645.

His relationship to other Spartan kings is unclear. According to Herodotus, Archidamus was the son of Anaxandridas I and fathered Anaxilas. According to Pausanias, Archidamus was the son of Anaxidamus and fathered Agasicles.

Archidamus was contemporary with the Tegeatan War, which followed soon after the end of the Second Messenian War, in 668 BC.

Archidamus is the first Spartan king to bear the word damos in his name. Previously, royal names of both dynasties often included the word laus. These words already existed during the Mycenaean era, in which Laos meant people and damos designated a small community, but in the 7th century the latter word acquired a political meaning, that of the citizens as a whole. As the Eurypontids were the junior of the Agiads, it seems that they tried to compensate their inferiority by courting citizens. Then, damos-names often appear among the Eurypontids, such as Damaratos, Zeuxidamos, and the later Archidamos.

== Bibliography ==
- Paul Cartledge, Agesilaos and the Crisis of Sparta, Baltimore, Johns Hopkins University Press, 1987.

Preceded by Anaxandridas I or Anaxidamus	Eurypontid King of Sparta	Succeeded by Anaxilas or Agasicles
