= Military history of Sparta (disambiguation) =

Military history of Sparta may refer to:

- History of Sparta, for historical information
- Spartan army, for the wars and soldiers of Sparta

== See also ==
- Sparta, for a look at Sparta in a more geographical sense
