= Pitane =

Pitane may refer to:

- Pitane (Aeolis), an ancient coastal city of Aeolis, currently the site of Çandarlı, İzmir Province, Turkey
- Pitane (Amazon), mythological eponym of Pitane (Aeolis)
- Pitane (Laconia), an ancient settlement near Sparta
- Pitane (moth), a moth genus in Family Erebidae
- Pitane (nymph), daughter of Eurotas

== See also ==
- Pitana (disambiguation)
