= Anaxandridas =

Anaxandridas (Greek: Ἀναξανδρίδας) may refer to:

- Anaxandridas I, king of Sparta from c. 675 to c. 645 BC
- Anaxandridas II, king of Sparta between 560 and 525 BC
