= Soos (king of Sparta) =

King of Sparta

Soos (Ancient Greek: Σόος) was a fictional king of Sparta, created in the 4th century BC in order to harmonise the list of the two Spartan dynasties. Various deeds were also attached to his reign, dated by ancient authors to the 11th century BC.

== Life ==
Soos is supposed to be the son of Procles, the alleged founder of the Eurypontid dynasty, one of the two royal family in Sparta (the other being the Agiads). However, modern historians consider that he was invented during the 4th century BC. Soos is absent from the lists of kings given by Herodotus, who wrote in the 5th century. He makes his first appearance in Plato's dialogue Cratylus, but he is only described there as a nobleman, not a king. A bit later, the historian Ephorus implicitly recognized him as king by referring to Lycurgus as the sixth Eurypontid in line from Procles, which is only possible if Soos is counted as king. The main reason for his addition was the need to synchronize the reigns of the Eurypontid Theopompus and the Agiad Polydorus—who were thought to have reigned together—as the Agiads counted one more king before Polydorus; so, by crafting Soos, the two king lists became symmetrical, and Theopompus's reign could be pushed later.

According to Pausanias, Soos was the son of Procles and father of Eurypon. His name means "stability", a key concept for Spartan identity—such personifications of concepts are typical of orally transmitted lists. During his supposed rule, Spartans took away the freedom of the helots, and claimed some territories of Arcadia.

Plutarch wrote of a time that the Clitorians encircled the Spartans, preventing their access to water sources. Soos made an agreement that he would return the lands he had conquered to them if him and all his men would be allowed water to drink. He then promised the kingdom whichever of his soldiers would refuse to drink. Every one of them drank except Soos himself, who only splashed his face with the water, so he refused to keep the agreement with the Clitorians.

== Bibliography ==
- Mait Kõiv, "The Origins, Development, and Reliability of the Ancient Tradition about the Formation of the Spartan Constitution", Historia: Zeitschrift für Alte Geschichte, Bd. 54, H. 3 (2005), pp. 233–264.

Preceded by Procles	King of Sparta of Eurypontid dynasty 9th century BCE	Succeeded by Eurypon
