= Laconicus =

King of Sparta (circa 192 BC)

Laconicus (Ancient Greek: Λακωνικός Lakonikos; fl. 192 BC) was a Spartan of royal descent who appears as king of Sparta for a brief moment in the aftermath of the assassination of Nabis in 192 BC. Little is known about him; even his name may not be correct.

== Life ==
The name Laconicus is dubious, as it is otherwise unattested in Sparta. The name is only found in the account of the Roman historian Livy, who may have made a mistake while reading the Greek historian Polybius, his main source for the events of 192 BC. Polybius might have only mentioned a "Laconian boy", translated as a name by Livy ("Laconicus"). Other spellings have been suggested instead, such as Laonicus or Leonidas, but Alfred Bradford accepts it as several unusual names were given in Sparta at the time. Bradford furthermore suggests that Laconicus could have been a son of Lycurgus, Eurypontid king of Sparta between 219 BC and c. 212 BC.

Laconicus grew up under the rule of Nabis, king of Sparta since the death of Pelops (son of Lycurgus) in 212, and was raised with his sons. In 192, Nabis was murdered by a contingent of 1000 Aetolian allies led by Alexamenus, who were present in the city to help Nabis in his war against the Achaean League. The Spartans then massacred the Aetolians and appointed Laconicus as king. However, the strategos of the Achaean League Philopoemen took advantage of the crisis to enter Sparta and forced the city to join his League, ending the independence of Sparta. The kingship was abolished, and Sparta came under the rule of an oligarchy loyal to Philopoemen.

== Bibliography ==
=== Ancient works ===
- Titus Livius (Livy), Ab Urbe Condita Libri.

=== Modern works ===
- Alfred S. Bradford, A Prosopography of Lacedaemonians from the Death of Alexander the Great, 323 B. C., to the Sack of Sparta by Alaric, A. D. 396, Munich, Beck, 1977. ISBN 3406047971
- John Briscoe, A Commentary on Livy: Books 34 - 37, Oxford, Clarendon Press, 1981. ISBN 9780198144557
- Paul Cartledge & Antony Spawforth, Hellenistic and Roman Sparta, A tale of two cities, London and New York, Routledge, 2002 (originally published in 1989). ISBN 0-415-26277-1
- Graham J. Shipley, The Early Hellenistic Peloponnese: Politics, Economies, and Networks 338-197 BC, Cambridge University Press, 2018. ISBN 9780521873697
