= Eupolia =

Queen of Sparta (c. 5th century BC)

- Born: 5th century BC
- Children: Agesilaus II, Cynisca, Teleutias
- Parent(s): Melesippidas
- Titles: queen consort

Eupolia (in ancient Greek: Εὐπωλία), was an aristocrat and queen of Sparta. Likely originating from the ranks of the Spartan aristocracy, she married Archidamus II. Eupolia is also the mother of Agesilaus II, a major king of Sparta, Cynisca, the first woman to have won the ancient Olympic Games, and their younger brother Teleutias.

After the death of Archidamus II, she remarried a certain Theodorus. Several elements suggest that this marriage was desired, as Theodorus was less wealthy than she was; Agesilaus II intervened to finance the couple.

== Biography ==
The character, like other female figures of ancient Greece, is difficult to access through sources, which exclusively link her to men. Probably originating from an important aristocratic family of the city, she was the daughter of Melesippidas and the second wife of Archidamus II, with whom she had a certain son, Agesilaus II, and a probable daughter, Cynisca.

She was said to have been of small stature, as Archidamus reportedly faced criticism from the ephors when he decided to marry her, on the grounds that marrying a small woman would produce "kinglets." The marriage is dated between 445 and 443 BC.

After the death of her husband, she remarried a certain Theodorus and had a son named Teleutias. It is likely that this marriage after her widowhood, when Eupolia was over thirty years old, was a marriage of her choice. Several elements suggest that this Theodorus was less wealthy, and marrying him was thus a degradation of her socioeconomic status. Facing the difficulties of the new couple, Agesilaus II decided to give her lands and funds as soon as he obtained the throne.

She was mentioned in several places in Greek literature, starting with the works of Aristophanes.
