= Agasicles =

6th-century Spartan king

Agasicles, alternatively spelled Agesicles or Hegesicles (Ancient Greek: Ἀγασικλῆς, Ἀγησικλῆς, Ἡγησικλῆς), was a king of Sparta, the 13th of the line of Procles.

Son of Archidamus I, he was contemporary with the Agiad Leon, and succeeded his father, probably about 590 BC or 600. During his reign the Lacedaemonians carried on an unsuccessful war against Tegea, but prospered in their other wars. (Herod. i. 65; Paus. iii. 7, § 6, 3. §. 5.) He was succeeded by his son Ariston.

== Notes ==
Preceded by Archidamus I	Eurypontid King of Sparta c. 575 – c. 550 BC	Succeeded by Ariston
