= Zeuxidamus =

Spartan Eurypontid princes/king

Zeuxidamus (Ancient Greek: Ζευξίδαμος) can refer to two ancient Spartans.

1. A king of Sparta, and 10th of the Eurypontid dynasty. He was grandson of Theopompus, son of Anaxandridas I, and father of Anaxidamus, who succeeded him.
2. A son of Leotychides, king of Sparta. He was also named Cyniscus (Κυνίσκος). He died before his father, leaving a son, Archidamus II
