= Siege of Plataea =

Siege during Peloponnesian War (429–427 BC)

| Date | 429–427 BC |
| Location | Plataea |
| Result | Sparto-Theban victory |

Belligerents
| Plataea | Sparta; Thebes |

Commanders and leaders
| Eupompides | Archidamus II |

Strength
| 400 infantry | 5,000 infantry |

Casualties and losses
| 200 dead | Unknown |

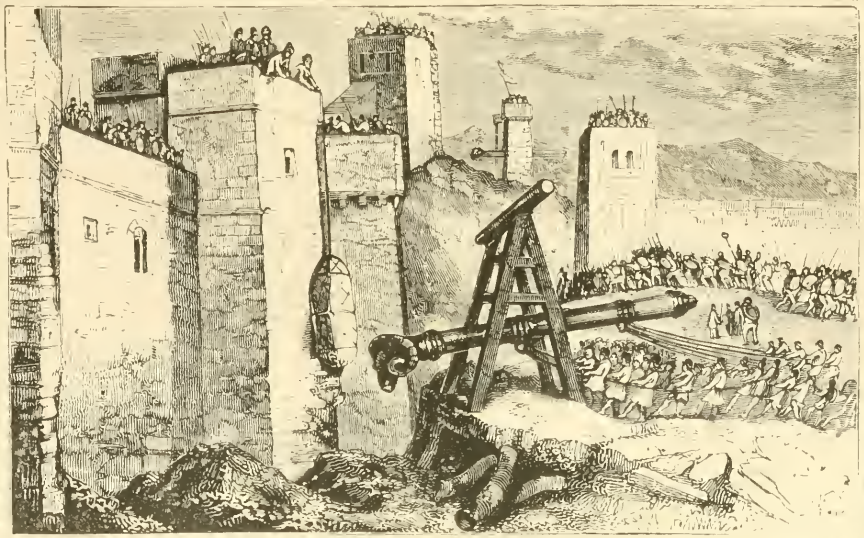
An illustration of the Siege of Plataea from an encyclopedia of war.

The siege of Plataea took place in 429–427 BC, during the Peloponnesian War. At the beginning of the conflict, the Thebans attacked the city of Plataea, an Athenian ally on the border between Boeotia and Attica. The initial Theban attempt to capture the city failed, but in 429 BC the Thebans' allies, the Spartans under their king Archidamus II, laid siege to the city. Left unaided by Athens, the Plataeans finally surrendered in 428 BC. Plataea was razed to the ground by the Thebans, and was not restored until after 338 BC by Philip II of Macedon.

== First Theban attack ==
According to Thucydides, an armed force of 300 Thebans commanded by two leading Theban generals were admitted after dark on a stormy moonless night into Plataea by two private citizens who expected the Theban force to immediately capture and kill the democratic leaders and bring Plataea into alliance with Thebes. Instead the Theban commanders harmed no one but attempted to persuade all of the citizens of Plataea to join with Thebes' allies. The democratic leadership accepted the offer but quickly worked out that the invading force could be overpowered because of their small numbers, their lack of knowledge of the streets, the bad weather, and the darkness. The enraged citizenry then attacked them. In one of the rare instances in which both women and slaves took part in what amounted to warfare, the citizenry killed over half the 300 Thebans. Thucydides reports that a number of the remaining Thebans escaped with the help of a Plataean woman who provided them with an axe to break open one of the town's gates. Some of the invaders tried to escape by jumping off the city wall, but most of these were killed in the fall. Others entered a large open building, mistaking it for an exit from the town. The Plataeans locked the building and held them there for a short time before killing them all.

A second larger Theban force was supposed to reinforce the invading force, but the weather and the flooding of the Asopos river delayed them. The Plataeans, to forestall any attempt by the second force to capture Plataeans who lived outside the walls, agreed to let their Theban prisoners live if the Thebans did no further harm. Each side alleged later that the other had taken an oath to the agreement and then broke it, a potentially serious issue in the propaganda war that would impact on future relations between the two sides.

After the invaders had entered the town, a Plataean messenger was sent to Athens to alert them to what was happening. A second messenger later that night updated the Athenians on the outcome. The Athenians sent a messenger back to Plataea instructing them not to kill the prisoners, but he arrived too late. The Plataeans had already killed them all. The Athenians also sent a force to relieve Plataea. Women, children, and men too old or otherwise unfit for military service were evacuated to Attica.

Thucydides states (Book II.1–6) that these events, during which Thebes and its Boeotian allies lost over 10 percent of their total army, represented the beginning of the Peloponnesian War, which would go on for another 27 years. He says that "the treaty had now been broken by an overt act after the affair at Plataea" and that "Athens and Lacedaemon now resolved to send embassies to the King and to such other of the barbarian powers as either party could look to for assistance."

== Spartan intervention and siege ==
During the summer, two years after these events occurred, the Spartan king Archidamus II finally led a Peloponnesian force against Plataea and began to raze their crops. The Plataeans, in response, dispatched a herald reminding the Spartans of the glorious deeds the Plataeans performed during the Greco-Persian War and of the oath the Spartans swore to protect them and keep them independent and reminding the Spartans that in 479 BC, Pausanias, the Spartan general, had decreed that Plataea was on holy ground and it should never be attacked. The Spartans responded by demanding Plataean neutrality in return for their protection. After consulting Athens, Plataea rejected the Spartan proposal and began in earnest to prepare their defences. The Spartans then quickly laid siege to the city, and employed several innovative, yet unsuccessful tactics to bypass the Plataean defences. Failing in these undertakings, the Spartans built a line of fortifications around the city, left enough troops to guard the walls, then retired.

=== Sortie of the defenders ===
The winter of the next year found the Plataeans in a desperate situation. They were besieged by the Spartans and Boeotians and were uncertain whether any Athenian help would arrive. Their stores were running dangerously low, and so a desperate plan was developed to try and salvage their position. The plan involved breaking past the Spartan defences and escape; originally all the men were to join the attempt, but the danger being so great, only 220 ultimately agreed to go. They accordingly waited for a dark, stormy night, and implemented the plan. Catching the guards by surprise, 212 men managed to evade capture. Thucydides writes, "it was mainly the violence of the storm that enabled them to effect their escape at all."

=== Surrender ===
The remaining Plataeans finally surrendered to the Spartans in the summer of the next year, as all supplies they had were exhausted and no hope of help remained. They had trusted the Spartans to a fair trial, as the Lacedaemonians (Spartans) had promised to "judge them all fairly", and that "only the guilty should be punished" if they yielded.

Yet, when the Plataean prisoners were brought before the judges, no trial was held; no chance for apology was offered. The Spartans simply asked each of the prisoners if they had done the Lacedaemonians and allies any service in the war, to which the prisoners, after a heated debate, ultimately had to answer "no".

Thus, the Spartans killed over 200 of the Plataean defenders "among which were 25 Athenians" according to Thucydides. The Thebans ultimately razed the entire town, and

built on to the precinct of Hera an inn two hundred feet square, with rooms all round above and below, making use for this purpose of the roofs and doors of the Plataeans: of the rest of the materials in the wall, the brass and the iron, they made couches which they dedicated to Hera, for whom they also built a stone chapel of a hundred feet square.

The choice of Hera as the goddess glorified at the expense of the dispossessed Plataeans might have been motivated by Hera's alleged jealousy of Zeus' giving birth to Athena, patron goddess of Athens, without recourse to her.

The conspicuous worship of Hera at Plataea continued long past the end of the war. In later times the temple was renowned for a sculpture by Callimachus of Hera seated as a bride, as well as a sculpture of a matronly Hera in a standing position.

== Aftermath and the reconstruction of Plataea ==
Thebes occupied the site of Plataea until 387 BC. Athens harbored the city's survivors. The Thebans were on the losing side in the Corinthian War and the 387 Peace of Antalcidas required Thebes disband its Boeotian League. This made possible the rebuilding of Plataea in 386. However, with the resurgence of Thebes and the creation of the Theban hegemony by Epaminondas, the Thebans destroyed Plataea again in 373.

In 338 BC, after Philip II of Macedon defeated the Thebans at the Battle of Chaeronea, he reestablished Plataea as "a symbol of Greek courage in resisting the Persians". His son, Alexander the Great in 335 altogether destroyed Thebes, whereupon its territory was divided among the cities of Boeotia – evidently, the rebuilt Plataea shared in this territorial division.

== See also ==
- Victor's justice
