= Nicander of Sparta =

King of Sparta from c. 750 to c. 725 BC

Nicander (Greek: Νίκανδρος, reigned from c. 750 to c. 725 BC) was king of Sparta and a member of the Eurypontid dynasty.

Sparta was a diarchy, having two kings at the same time, an Agiad and a Eurypontid. The Agiad king at the time of Nicander was Teleclus, who was allegedly assassinated by the neighbouring Messenians. Nicander was the son of the previous Eurypontid king, Charilaus and was succeeded as Eurypontid king by his own son, Theopompus of Sparta.

As king, Nicander and his allies the Asinaeans carried out a raid on nearby Argolis, causing the Argives to attack Asine in return.
