= Battle of the Fetters =

6th century BCE Spartan defeat near Tegea

Map of the ancient Peloponnese, with Arcadia and Laconia (the Spartan country).

The Battle of the Fetters (Greek: Πεδας (pedas); also translated as chains or shackles) was an engagement between Sparta and their neighbors to the north, Tegea. It came about when Sparta, in search of new land, sought to conquer the people of Arcadia in the central Peloponnese. The story comes from Herodotus and he gave no date for it, except to say that it occurred shortly after Lycurgus the lawgiver had re-engineered Spartan society to set it on the military footing for which it was famous throughout the Archaic and Classical periods of Greek history. His rendering is short enough to quote in full:

With these changes [Lycurgan reforms], they attained good government, and after Lycurgus died, they build a shrine in his honor and worshipped him with great reverence. And as their land was fertile and their population large, they soon thrived and became a flourishing people. Indeed, they were no longer content with peace, and because they assumed that they could prove themselves superior to the Arcadians, they consulted the oracle at Delphi about all the land in Arcadia. The Pythia replied:

For Arcadia you ask me; you ask for much; I refuse to give it. Eaters of acorns, and many of them, dwell in Arcadia, and they will stop you. But not all will I grudge you; Tegea I will give you, a dance floor to tread, a beautiful plain to measure out with a line.

When these verses were reported to the Lacedaemonians, their reaction was to forgo the rest of Arcadia and march on Tegea. Overlooking the ambiguity of the oracle, they brought shackles along with them, confident that they would enslave the Tegeans. In the battle that took place, however, the Spartans were defeated, and all of them who were taken alive were made to work the plain of Tegea, measuring it out with a line and wearing the very shackles they had brought along with them. Those shackles are still, even in my day, hanging safe in Tegea, around the temple of Athena Alea.

Indeed, they were still there when travel writer Pausanias visited Tegea in the 2nd century CE.

There were to be additional defeats for Sparta at the hands of the Tegeans. In frustration, they revisited the oracle at Delphi to determine what it would take to beat them and were told to bring the bones of Orestes back to Sparta. Unable to discover their location, they went a third time to Delphi and were told they were in Tegea. The exact location was described, but in ambiguous terms, and it was a considerable time before Lichas, one of their retired soldiers, figured it out on a visit to Tegea. He was eventually able to secure the bones and return them to Sparta, at which time the Spartans were able to conquer the Tegeans. This repatriation took place, according to Herodotus, during the Spartan kingships of Anaxandridas (560–520) and Ariston (550–515), in the time when Croesus was ruler of Lydia in Anatolia (585–546) – putting it in the 550-546 time frame.
