= Prytanis (king of Sparta) =

King of Sparta (r. 865-835 BC)

Prytanis (Ancient Greek: Πρύτανις; reigned from c. 865 to c. 835 BC) was king of Sparta and a member of the Eurypontid dynasty. He was succeeded by Polydectes.
