= Ariston of Sparta =

Eurypontid king of Sparta from c.560 to c.510 BC

Ariston (Ancient Greek: Ἀρίστων) was a king of Sparta, 14th of the Eurypontid kings, son of Agasicles, and contemporary of the Agiad king, Anaxandrides II. He reigned from approximately 560 BC to shortly after 510 BC. There are two main sources for him, Herodotus and Pausanias.

Of his military or political activities we are told nothing. As Herodotus told it, Ariston had married twice, but neither wife had borne him a child. He had a close friend named Agetus who had an exceedingly beautiful wife, and Ariston, having fallen in love with her, connived to trick his friend into trading this woman for anything among his belongings that Agetus might choose. Once married to her, she became pregnant, and a son was later born – but after 7 months.

When Ariston was first told of the birth, he counted the months since the marriage and swore that the child could not be his – this in the presence of the council of ephors. He soon regretted his outburst, especially after his wife explained that not all pregnancies last nine months. The boy was named Demaratus (Attic: Δημαρατος, Doric: Δαμαρατος), meaning “prayed for by the people”. As the lad grew to manhood, Ariston fully accepted him and loved him as his son, and after his death Demaratus succeeded him as the Eurypontid king of Sparta.

His outburst before the ephors was remembered, and later used to challenge the legitimacy of Demaratus’ kingship by the Agiad king, Cleomenes.

Ariston is credited by Pseudo-Plutarch with these comments:

Ariston, when one commended the saying of Cleomenes, who, being asked what a good king should do, replied, “Good turns to his friends, and evil to his enemies”, said, “Much better is it, sir, to do good to our friends, and make our enemies our friends!” Though upon all hands it is agreed Socrates spoke this first, yet he hath the credit of it, too.

To one asking how many the Spartans were in number he replied, “Enough to chase our enemies.”

[In response to] an Athenian making a funeral oration in praise of those that fell by the hand of the Lacedaemonians, he said, “What brave fellows then were ours, that conquered these.”

| Preceded by Agasicles | Eurypontid King of Sparta c. 560 – c. 510 BC | Succeeded by Demaratus |
