= Mesoa =

Mesoa (Ancient Greek: Μεσόα), or Messoa (Μεσσόα), was a settlement that existed before the Dorian conquest. It was united with three other such settlements (Pitane, Limnae, and Cynosura) by a common sacrifice to Artemis, and eventually coalesced into ancient Sparta. It is probable that Mesoa was in the southeast part of the city.

Its site is unlocated.
