= Limnae (Sparta) =

Limnae or Limnai (Ancient Greek: Λίμναι) was a settlement that existed before the Dorian conquest. It was united with three other such settlements (Mesoa, Pitane, and Cynosura) by a common sacrifice to Artemis, and eventually coalesced into ancient Sparta. Limnae was situated upon the Eurotas, having derived its name from the marshy ground which once existed there; and as the Dromus occupied a great part of the lower level towards the southern extremity, it is probable that Limnae occupied the northern.

Its site is unlocated.
