= Archidamus (physician) =

Ancient Greek physician

Archidamus (Ancient Greek: Ἀρχίδαμος) was a physician of ancient Greece of whom no particulars are known, but who must have lived in the fourth or fifth century BCE, as Galen quotes one of his opinions, which was preserved by the medical writer Diocles of Carystus.

A physician of the same name is mentioned by Pliny, though it is unclear if these two individuals are indeed the same.

A few fragments titled "On Veterinary Surgery" by a person named "Archedemus" are to be found in the Veterinariae Medicinae Libri Duo of Jean Ruel. These were first published in Latin in Paris in 1530, and afterwards in Greek by Simon Grynaeus in 1537. It is also unclear whether this is originally by the same physician.
