= Archedemus =

Archedemus or Archedamus (Ancient Greek: Ἀρχέδημος or Ἀρχέδαμος) was the name of a number of different people from classical antiquity:

- Archedemus of Athens, an Athenian leader in the 5th century BCE
- Archedemus of Pelekes (Ὁ Πήληξ), a speaker mentioned by Aeschines who is otherwise unknown but should be distinguished from the preceding
- Archedemus of Aetolia, an Aetolian who commanded the Aetolian troops which assisted the Romans in the Second Macedonian War with Philip V of Macedon
- Archedemus of Tarsus, stoic philosopher from the 2nd century BCE
- Archedemus of Thera, stone worker, sculptor 5th century BCE. He transformed the Vari Cave into a sanctuary dedicated to Pan, the Nymphs and the Charites.
