= Anaxidamus =

Anaxidamus (Ancient Greek: Ἀναξίδαμος) was a king of Sparta, 11th of the Eurypontids.

Anaxidamus was the son of Zeuxidamus and contemporary with Anaxander, and lived to the conclusion of the Messenian Wars, 668 BC (Paus. iii. 7. § 5.) He was succeeded by his son Archidamus I.

| Preceded by Zeuxidamas | Eurypontid King of Sparta c. 645 – c. 625 BC | Succeeded by Archidamus I |
