= Pitane (Laconia) =

Pitane (Ancient Greek: Πιτάνη), or Pitana (Πιτάνα), was a settlement that existed before the Dorian conquest. It was united with three other such settlements (Mesoa, Limnae, and Cynosura) by a common sacrifice to Artemis, and eventually coalesced into ancient Sparta. Pitane is called a polis by Euripides, and is also mentioned as a place by Pindar. Herodotus, who had been there, calls it a deme. He also mentions a λόχος Πιτανάτης ("company of Pitane"); and Caracalla, in imitation of antiquity, composed a λόχος Πιτανάτης of Spartans. Thucydides claims that the "λόχος Πιτανάτης" cited by Herodotus never actually existed, and cites the story as an example of baseless hearsay propagated by "other Hellenes." It appears from the passage of Pindar quoted above, that Pitane was at the ford of the Eurotas, and consequently in the northern part of the city. It was the favourite and fashionable place of residence at Sparta, like Collytus at ancient Athens and Craneion at Corinth. We are also told that Pitane was near the temple and stronghold of Issorium.

Pitane was also the home of the Agiads, one of the two Spartan dynasties.

Its site is unlocated. Pitane is or was located in Laconia (also referred to as Lacedaemonia). Pindar describes Pitane as being at the ford of the Eurotas
