= Theopompus of Sparta =

Theopompus (Ancient Greek: Θεόπομπος) was a Eurypontid king of Sparta. He is believed to have reigned during the late 8th and early 7th century BC.

Sparta was a diarchy, having two kings at the same time, an Agiad and a Eurypontid. Theopompus was the son and successor to the Eurypontid king Nicander.

The major event of his reign was the First Messenian War, which resulted in the defeat of the Messenians, for which, Pausanias reports, Tyrtaeus credits Theompompus:

To our king beloved of the gods, Theopompus, through whom we took Messene with wide dancing-grounds.

Pausanias writes that Theopompus was succeeded by his grandson Zeuxidamas or great-grandson Anaxidamus, Theopompus' son Archidamus having predeceased him, though there is some evidence that his successor was Anaxandridas I, father of Zeuxidamus.

Plutarch, in his Parallel Lives, stated that it was in Theopompus' reign that the ephors were introduced in Sparta. Plutarch also recorded a tradition in Messenia that Theopompus had fallen in battle, being slain by Aristomenes. Sparta denied the truth of this latter story, claiming that Theopompus had been only wounded.

Preceded by Nicander	Eurypontid King of Sparta c.720-c.675	Succeeded by Anaxandridas I
