= Anaxandridas I =

King of Sparta

Anaxandridas I (Ancient Greek: Ἀναξανδρίδας) was a conjectured king of Sparta and a member of the Eurypontid dynasty. According to the Histories of Herodotus, Anaxandridas was the son of king Theopompus and the father of king Archidamus I. If Anaxandridas actually existed, he would have reigned in the early to mid 7th century BC, but his historicity is doubtful.

According to Pausanias, Anaxandridas I ascended the throne not as the direct successor of Theopompus but as the successor of Zeuxidamos, one of Theopompus's grandsons.

Anaxandridas's reign is said to have followed a period of strife between the Spartan royal houses and to have been characterised by a continuing decline of royal prestige and power, especially relative to the Ephors. It is possible that Anaxandridas was in power during the Messenian revolt that precipitated the Second Messenian War.
