= Cynosura (Laconia) =

Cynosura or Kynosoura (Ancient Greek: Κυνόσουρα) was a settlement that existed before the Dorian conquest. It was united with three other such settlements (Pitane, Limnae, and Mesoa) by a common sacrifice to Artemis, and eventually coalesced into ancient Sparta. It is probable that Cynosura was in the southwest part of the city.

Its site is unlocated.
