= Polydectes of Sparta =

Polydectes (Ancient Greek: Πολυδέκτης; reigned from c. 835 to c. 805 BC) was king of Sparta and a member of the Eurypontid dynasty. He was succeeded by king Eunomus.
