= Procles =

- Basileus (king) of Sparta
- Reign: c. 1104 – 1062 BC
- Successor: Soos
- Consort: Anaxandra
- Issue: Soos; Lyside (wife of Periander)
- House: Heraclids
- Father: Aristodemus
- Mother: Argia

In Greek legends, Procles (Greek: Προκλῆς, romanized: Proklē̃s, "the renowned") was one of the Heracleidae, a great-great-great-grandson of Heracles, and a son of Aristodemus and Argia. His twin was Eurysthenes. Together they received the land of Lacedaemon after Cresphontes, Temenus and Aristodemus defeated Tisamenus, the last Achaean king of the Peloponnesus. Procles married Anaxandra, daughter of Thersander, King of Kleonoe, sister of his sister-in-law Lathria, and was the father of Soos and the grandfather of Eurypon, founder of the Eurypontid dynasty of the Kings of Sparta.

The title of archēgetēs, "founding magistrate," was explicitly denied to Eurysthenes and Procles by the later Spartan government on the grounds that they were not founders of a state, but were maintained in their offices by parties of foreigners. Instead the honor was granted to their son and grandson, for which reason the two lines were called the Agiads and the Eurypontids.

== Legend of the double kingship ==
After the death of Aristodemus the Spartans consulted the oracle at Delphi concerning which of his twin sons should rule. The oracle advised them to set up a dual monarchy. Theras, Argeia's brother was made regent. There was still a necessity of designating the elder. They chose the one the mother fed and cleaned first, Eurysthenes. Consequently, the Eurypontid line was the less senior in status and decision-making,

== Dates of the reigns of the first nine kings of the Eurypontid line ==
The untimely death of Aristodemus with other events has served as some basis for dating the reigns of the first nine kings of Sparta in the line known by state definition as the Eurypontid. The Return of the Heracleidae, which is the closest event to a Dorian Invasion available in legend, must coincide with the entry of Aristodemus and his brethren into Arcadia, which, based on the chronology of Eratosthenes, happened 328 years before the generally accepted date of the first year of the first Olympiad, 776 BC. Eratosthenes' date is therefore 1104 BC. This must be the year of Aristodemus' military activity in Arcadia, his fatherhood and his assassination. Procles was therefore born in 1104 BC, which was the first year of his reign, if the regency of Theras is discounted.

Pausanias states that the end of the First Messenian War was the first year of the 14th Olympiad. The date must have been 724/723 BC if the first year of the first Olympiad was 776/775 BC. Kings Polydorus of the Agiads and Theopompus of the Eurypontids were reigning at that time, roughly in mid-reign. The end of the war must be 379 years from the return of the Heraclids. According to Isaac Newton, also a classical scholar, the nine kings reigned an average of 42 years each, which can be used as an estimator of the dates. The less senior line has a slightly lower mortality rate than the senior line. Procles' reign might be estimated at 1104–1062, except that some sources say he died one year before Eurysthenes. Taking into account both pieces of information, the estimate would be 1104–1063. An alternative would be to accept the 1104-1062 and extend the estimate for Eurysthenes to 1104–1061. In either the case margin of error remains unknown, as much of the data is relatively uncertain.

== See also ==
- List of kings of Sparta
- Twins in mythology

== Bibliography ==
- Müller, Karl Otfried (1830). The history and antiquities of the Doric race. Vol. I. Translated by George Cornewall Lewis; Henry Tufnell. London: J. Murray.

Preceded by Aristodemus?	King of Sparta c. 1104 – c. 1062 B.C.	Succeeded by Soos
