= Archidamus II =

Eurypontid king of Sparta from 469/8 to 427/6 BC

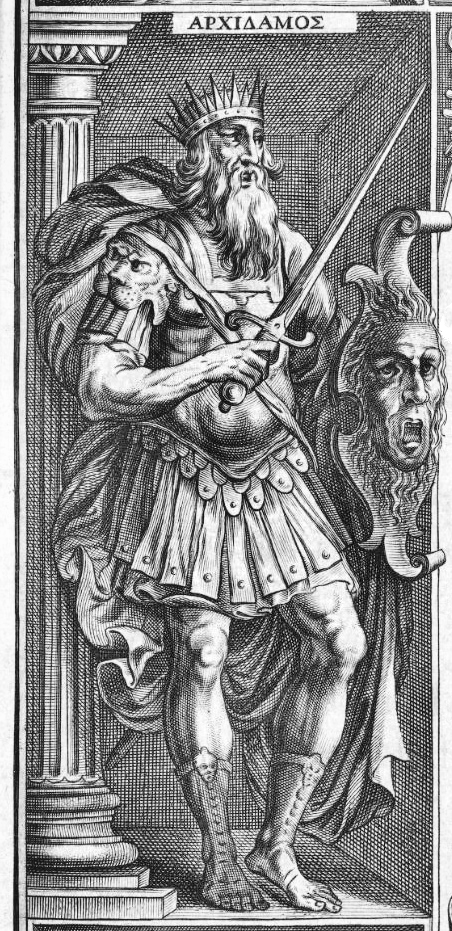
- Archidamos,1629 woodprint

King of Sparta
- Reign: 469/8–427/6 BC (42 years)
- Predecessor: Leotychidas II
- Successor: Agis II
- Died: 427/426 BC
- Spouse: Eupolia
- Issue: Agis II; Agesilaus II; Cynisca
- Greek: Ἀρχίδαμος
- Dynasty: Eurypontid
- Father: Zeuxidamus

Archidamus II (Ancient Greek: Ἀρχίδαμος Archídāmos; died 427/6 BC) was a king of Sparta who reigned from approximately 469/8 BC to 427/6 BC. His father was Zeuxidamus (called Cyniscos by many Spartans). Zeuxidamus married and had a son, Archidamus. However, Zeuxidamus died before his father, Leotychidas.

After the death of his son and heir, Leotychidas married Eurydame, the sister of Menius and daughter of Diactorides. While they had no male offspring, they did have a daughter, Lampito, whom Leotychidas gave in marriage to his grandson Archidamus. They had a son Agis II.

Archidamus's later second marriage was to Eupolia. The Ephors objected to this union, arguing that due to Eupolia's short stature, “She will bear us kinglets instead of kings”. He married her nonetheless and was for that fined by the Ephors.

To them were born a son, Agesilaus II, and a daughter, Cynisca.

== Rule ==
Archidamus gained the Spartan throne after his grandfather, Leotychidas, was banished around 469 or 468 BC after being accused of bribery.

Archidamus was one of the kings of Sparta in the years preceding the Peloponnesian War. His coolness and presence of mind are said to have saved the Spartan state from destruction on the occasion of the great earthquake of 464 BC, but this story must be regarded as at least doubtful.

In 446 BC he reached agreement with Pericles on the Thirty Years' Peace between Athens and Sparta, bringing an end to the First Peloponnesian War, which had been raging since c. 460 BC. (with the possible exception of a 5-years peace established in 451 BC).

During the negotiations that preceded the Peloponnesian War, he did his best to prevent, or at least to postpone, the inevitable struggle, but was overruled by the war party. He invaded Attica at the head of the Peloponnesian forces in the summers of 431 BC, 430 BC and 428 BC, and in 429 BC conducted operations against Plataea. He died probably in 427 BC, certainly before the summer of 426 BC, and was succeeded on the Spartan throne by his son, Agis II.

== Quotes ==
According to Thucydides in speeches attributed to Archidamus at the famous Debate at Sparta in 432 BC.

"If we begin the war in haste, we'll have many delays before we end it, owing to our lack of preparation."

== See also ==
- Cynisca
- Eupolia

Preceded by Leotychidas II	Eurypontid King of Sparta; 469/8–427/6 BC	Succeeded by Agis II
