= Eunomus (king of Sparta) =

Eunomus (Ancient Greek: Εὔνομος; reigned from c. 805 to c. 775 BC) was king of Sparta and a member of the Eurypontid dynasty. He was succeeded by king Charilaus.
