= List of kings of Sparta =

For most of its history, the ancient Greek city-state of Sparta in the Peloponnese was ruled by kings. Sparta was unusual among the Greek city-states in that it maintained its kingship past the Archaic age. It was even more unusual in that it had two kings simultaneously, who were called the archagetai, (Note: Greek: ἀρχᾱγέται, archagétai, plural of ἀρχᾱγέτης, archāgétēs, Doric Greek form of Attic ἀρχηγέτης, archēgétēs, 'first/chief leader'.) coming from two separate lines. According to tradition, the two lines, the Agiads (Ἀγιάδαι, Agiadai) and Eurypontids (Εὐρυποντίδαι, Eurypontidai), were respectively descended from the twins Eurysthenes and Procles, the descendants of Heracles, who supposedly conquered Sparta two generations after the Trojan War. The dynasties themselves, however, were named after the twins' grandsons, the kings Agis I and Eurypon, respectively. The Agiad line was regarded as being senior to the Eurypontid line.

Although there are lists of earlier purported kings of Sparta, there is little evidence for the existence of any before the mid-sixth century BC.

Spartan kings received a recurring posthumous hero cult like that of the similarly Doric kings of Cyrene. The kings' firstborn sons, as heirs-apparent, were the only Spartan boys expressly exempt from the Agoge; however, they were allowed to take part if they so wished, and this endowed them with increased prestige when they ascended the throne.

== Legendary kings of Sparta ==
Ancient Greeks named males after their fathers, producing a patronymic with the suffix -id-; for example, the sons of Atreus were the Atreids. For royal houses, the patronymic was formed from the name of the founder or of an early significant figure of a dynasty. A ruling family might thus have a number of dynastic names; for example, Agis I named the Agiads, but he was a Heraclid and so were his descendants.

If the descent was not known or was scantily known, the Greeks made a few standard assumptions based on their cultural ideology. Agiad people were treated as a tribe, presumed to have descended from an ancestor bearing its name. He must have been a king, who founded a dynasty of his name. That mythologizing extended even to place names. They were presumed to have been named after kings and divinities. Kings often became divinities, in their religion.

=== Lelegids ===
The Lelegid were the descendants of Lelex (a back-formation), ancestor of the Leleges, an ancient tribe inhabiting the Eurotas valley before the Greeks, who, according to the mythological descent, amalgamated with the Greeks

Year	Lelegid	Other notable information
c. 1600 BC	Lelex	son of Poseidon or Helios, or he was said to be autochthonous
c. 1575 BC	Myles	son of Lelex
c. 1550 BC	Eurotas	son of Myles, father of Sparta

=== Lacedaemonids ===
The Lacedaemonids contain Greeks from the age of legend, now treated as being the Bronze Age in Greece. In the language of mythologic descent, the kingship passed from the Leleges to the Greeks.

Year	Lacedaemonid	Other notable information
c.	Lacedaemon	son of Zeus, husband of Sparta
c.	Amyklas	son of Lacedaemon. He founded Amyklai
c.	Argalus	son of Amyklas
c.	Kynortas	son of Amyklas
c.	Perieres	son of Kynortas
c.	Oibalos	son of Kynortas
c.	Tyndareos	(First reign); son of Oibalos and father of Helen
c.	Hippocoon	son of Oibalos and brother of Tyndareos
c.	Tyndareos	(Second reign)

Years with no dates (only "c. ") are unknown

=== Atreids ===
The Atreidai (Latin Atreidae) belong to the Late Bronze Age, or the Mycenaean Period. In mythology, they were the Perseids. As the name of Atreus is attested in Hittite documents, this dynasty may well be protohistoric.

Year	Atreid	Other notable information
c. 1250 BC	Menelaus	son of Atreus and husband of Helen
c. 1150's BC	Orestes	son of Agamemnon and nephew of Menelaus
c.	Tisamenos	son of Orestes
c. 1100 BC	Dion	husband of Amphithea, the daughter of Pronax

Years with no dates (only "c.") are unknown

== Heraclids ==
The Spartan kings, as Heracleidae, claimed descent from Heracles, who through his mother was descended from Perseus. Disallowed the Peloponnesus, Heracles embarked on a life of wandering. The Heracleidae became ascendant in the Eurotas valley with the Dorians who, at least in legend, entered it during an invasion called the Return of the Heracleidae; driving out the Atreids and at least some of the Mycenaean population.

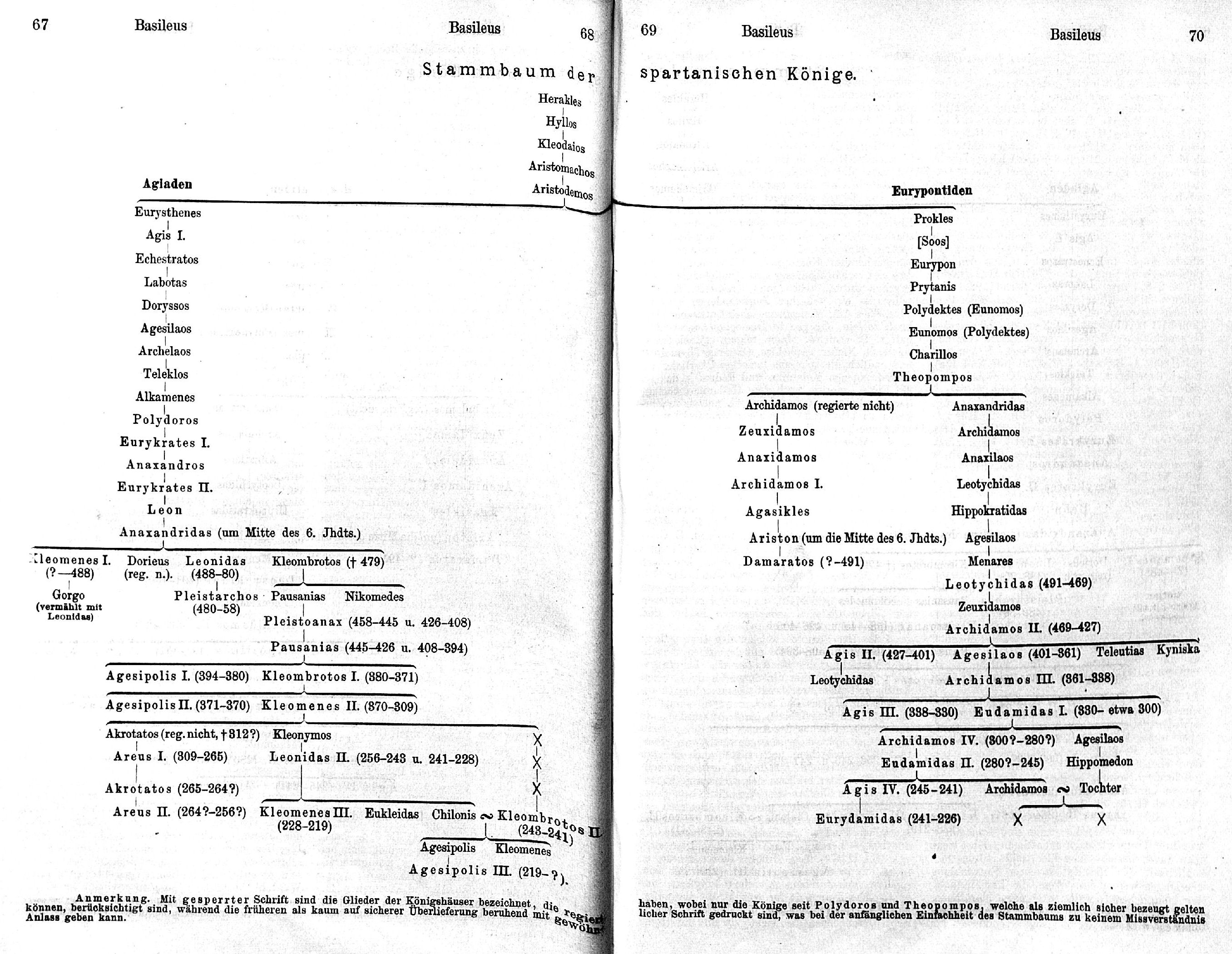
Genealogical Tree of the Kings of Sparta

Year	Heraclid	Other notable information
c.	Aristodemos	son of Aristomachus and husband of Argeia
c.	Theras (regent)	son of Autesion and brother of Aristodemus's wife Argeia; (Note: A Cadmid of Theban descent.) served as regent for his nephews, Eurysthenes and Procles.

Years with no dates (only "c.") are unknown

=== Agiad dynasty ===
The dynasty was named after its second king, Agis.

Year	Agiad	Other notable information
c. 930 BC	Eurysthenes	Return of the Heracleidae
c. 930 – 900 BC (Note: According to Apollodorus of Athens.)	Agis I	Subjugated the Helots
c. 900 – 870 BC	Echestratus	Expelled the Cynurensians (Note: Cynuria is said to have been colonized by Cynurus; Cynurensian bandits were common in the lands.) that were in power.
c. 870 – 840 BC	Labotas (Note: Or Labotes, Leobotes.)
c. 840 – 820 BC	Doryssus
c. 820 – 790 BC	Agesilaus I
c. 790 – 760 BC	Archelaus
c. 760 – 740 BC	Teleclus	Killed by the Messenians
c. 740 – 700 BC	Alcamenes	First Messenian War begins
c. 700 – 665 BC	Polydorus	First Messenian War ends; killed by the Spartan nobleman Polemarchus
c. 665 – 640 BC	Eurycrates
c. 640 – 615 BC	Anaxander
c. 615 – 590 BC	Eurycratides
c. 590 – 560 BC	Leon
c. 560 – 520 BC	Anaxandridas II	Battle of the Fetters
c. 520 – 490 BC	Cleomenes I	Greco-Persian Wars begins
c. 490 – 480 BC	Leonidas I	Battle of Thermopylae
c. 480 – 459 BC	Pleistarchus	First Peloponnesian War begins
c. 459 – 445 BC, 426 – 409 BC	Pleistoanax	Second Peloponnesian War begins
c. 445 – 426 BC, 409 – 395 BC	Pausanias	Helped restore democracy in Athens; Spartan hegemony
c. 395 – 380 BC	Agesipolis I	Corinthian War begins
c. 380 – 371 BC	Cleombrotus I
c. 371 – 369 BC	Agesipolis II (Note: Agesilaus II, distinguished king of Sparta, being asked which was the greater virtue, valor or justice, replied: "Unsupported by justice, valor is good for nothing; and if all men were just, there would be no need of valor".)
c. 369 – 309 BC	Cleomenes II	Third Sacred War begins
c. 309 – 265 BC	Areus I	Killed in battle against Aristodemus, the tyrant of Megalopolis
c. 265 – 262 BC	Acrotatus II
c. 262 – 254 BC	Areus II
c. 254 – 242 BC	Leonidas II	Briefly deposed while in exile avoiding trial
c. 242 – 241 BC	Cleombrotus II
c. 241 – 235 BC	Leonidas II
c. 235 – 222 BC	Cleomenes III	Exiled after the Battle of Sellasia
Following the Battle of Sellasia, the dual monarchy remained vacant until Cleomenes III's death in 219.
c. 219 – 215 BC	Agesipolis III	last Agiad, deposed by the Eurypontid Lycurgus

=== Eurypontid dynasty ===
The dynasty is named after its third king Eurypon. Not shown is Lycurgus, the lawgiver, a younger son of the Eurypontids, who served a brief regency either for the infant Charilaus (780–750 BC) or for Labotas (870–840 BC) the Agiad.

Year	Eurypontid	Other notable information
c. 930 BC	Procles	Return of the Heracleidae
c. 890 BC	Soos	Son of Procles and father of Eurypon. Likely fictitious.
c. 890 – 860 BC	Eurypon	Likely fictitious.
c. 860 – 830 BC	Prytanis	Likely fictitious.
c. 830 – 800 BC	Polydectes
c. 800 – 780 BC	Eunomus	Likely fictitious.
c. 780 – 750 BC	Charilaus	Ward and nephew of the Spartan reformer Lycurgus; War with the Argives; destroyed the border-town of Aegys; Battle of Tegea. Perhaps the first historical Eurypontid king.
c. 750 – 725 BC	Nicander
c. 725 – 675 BC	Theopompus	First Messenian War

Currently known two lists of kings:

According to Herodotus, VIII: 131

Year	Eurypontid	Other notable information
c. 675 – 660 BC	Anaxandridas I
c. 660 – 645 BC	Archidamus I
c. 645 – 625 BC	Anaxilas
c. 625 – 600 BC	Leotychidas I
c. 600 – 575 BC	Hippocratidas

According to Pausanias, III, 7: 5-6

Year	Eurypontid	Other notable information
c. 645 – 625 BC	Zeuxidamus
c. 625 – 600 BC	Anaxidamus
c. 600 – 575 BC	Archidamus I

Year	Eurypontid	Other notable information
c. 575 – 550 BC	Agasicles	Contemporary with Leon
c. 550 – 515 BC	Ariston	Battle of the Fetters.
c. 515 – 491 BC	Demaratus	deposed
c. 491 – 469 BC	Leotychidas II	great grandson of Hippocratidas, Greco-Persian Wars
c. 469 – 427 BC	Archidamus II	Second Peloponnesian War begins
c. 427 – 401 BC (Note: Or 427 – 400 BC)	Agis II	Spartan hegemony; Attacked Epidaurus, Leuctra, (Note: And again, after the Carnean festival.) Caryae, Orchomenos, and Mantineia; Invaded the Argolis; Council of war (Note: Consisting of 10 Spartans.) formed to check his powers.
c. 401 – 360 BC	Agesilaus II	Corinthian War begins
c. 360 – 338 BC	Archidamus III	Third Sacred War begins
c. 338 – 331 BC	Agis III
c. 331 – 305 BC	Eudamidas I
c. 305 – 275 BC	Archidamus IV
c. 275 – 245 BC	Eudamidas II
c. 245 – 241 BC	Agis IV
c. 241 – 228 BC	Eudamidas III
c. 228 – 227 BC	Archidamus V
c. 227 – 222 BC	Eucleidas	Actually an Agiad; installed by Cleomenes III (Note: I.e. Eucleidas's brother.) in place of Archidamus V. Died in the Battle of Sellasia.
Following the Battle of Sellasia, the dual monarchy remained vacant until Cleomenes III's death in 219.
c. 219 – 210 BC	Lycurgus	obscure background and possibly of non-royal descent, deposed the Agiad Agesipolis III and ruled alone
c. 210 – 206 BC	Pelops	son of Lycurgus

== Sole kings ==
Year	Tyrants	Other notable information
c. 210–207 BC	Machanidas	regent for Pelops
c. 206–192 BC	Nabis	first regent for Pelops, then usurper, claiming descent from the Eurypontid king Demaratus
c. 192 BC	Laconicus	last known king of Sparta from Heraclid dynasty

The Achaean League annexed Sparta in 192 BC.

== Notes and references ==
Notes

== Bibliography ==
- Paul Cartledge, Sparta and Lakonia, A Regional History 1300–362 BC, London, Routledge, 2002 (originally published in 1979). ISBN 0-415-26276-3
- The Cyclopædia, Volume 20. By Abraham Rees. Page 157+ (List of kings of Sparta on pg. 164).
- Sir William Smith, A New Classical Dictionary of Greek and Roman Biography, Mythology, and Geography: Partly Based Upon the Dictionary of Greek and Roman Biography and Mythology. Harper & Brothers, 1851.
- Sir William Smith. Abaeus-Dysponteus. J. Murray, 1890.
- Sir William Smith. A Dictionary of Greek and Roman Biography and Mythology: Earinus-Nyx. J. Murray, 1876.
- William Smith (Ed.) A Dictionary of Greek and Roman Biography and Mythology: Oarses-Zygia. J. Murray, 1880.
