= Apella (disambiguation) =

The Apella was the popular deliberative assembly of Sparta.

Apella may also refer to:

- Apellai, a Doric family-festival

== See also ==
- Apellas, sculptor of ancient Greece
- Sapajus apella (tufted capuchin), a primate
- Apellaia, the offerings made at the initiation of a young man of the northwest Greeks
