= Spartan Assembly =

Citizens' assembly in ancient Sparta

The Spartan Assembly, was the assembly of full citizens in the ancient Greek city-state of Sparta. Its principal role was to ratify the proposals brought to it by the gerousia and the ephors. Unlike its more famous counterpart the Assembly of ancient Athens, the Spartan Assembly had more limited powers. Its concurrence was required for legislation, and it helped determine state policy, particularly in foreign affairs. It voted by acclamation, and whether it debated is uncertain. The Assembly had regular meetings, which were probably convened and chaired by the ephors. Its official name is generally considered to have been 'the Ekklesia', rather than 'the Apella' as once commonly thought.

== Description ==
The Spartan Assembly consisted of the entire adult male citizenry, the Spartiates. Its total number of members is estimated to have been at least 3,000 during the fifth century BC. It was one of the three institutions involved with decision-making at Sparta, its principal function being to ratify the proposals of the other two decision-making bodies, the gerousia (the council of elders, including the two Spartan kings), and the ephors. In contrast to its Athenian counterpart, very little is known for certain about the Spartan Assembly. It could not, unlike the Athenian assembly, introduce legislation; it could only vote on legislation brought before it by the gerousia or ephors. The Assembly was probably convened and chaired by the ephors and, in addition to its legislative powers, it also decided issues of war and peace, appointed military commanders, elected the gerontes (i.e. the members of the gerousia), and could emancipate helots. Decisions of the Assembly were determined by shouting (or occasionally by division), rather than the counting of votes. Whether ordinary members of the Assembly had the right to speak is unclear.

== History ==
=== Archaic period ===
The Spartan Assembly probably existed, as an official Spartan institution, at least by the seventh century BC, and at first presumably met only when summoned. The earliest source concerning the Assembly is the Great Rhetra (c. 700 BC?). As quoted by the first-century historian Plutarch, and attributed to the legendary lawgiver Lycurgus, the Rhetra describes the Assembly's role in governing Sparta. According to the Rhetra, decision-making was divided among the archagetai ('kings'), the gerousia ('elders'), and the damos ('people', i.e. the Assembly). The Assembly had regular meetings, at a fixed time and place, during which the two kings and the gerousia could put proposals for approval before the Assembly, and the kings and gerousia could veto any enactment passed by the Assembly.

A fragment of the mid-seventh-century BC Spartan poet Tyrtaeus—using the terms "men of the people" (dēmotas andras) and "mass of the people" (dēmou plēthei)—seems also to refer to the Spartan Assembly during the Archaic period, saying that, after the kings and elders, then:

the men of the people, responding with straight utterances, are to speak fair words, act justly in everything, and not give the city (crooked) counsel. Victory and power are to accompany the mass of the people.

As reported by fifth-century BC historian Herodotus, the Assembly had enough power in the mid-sixth century BC such that the threat of action by it could force the Spartan king Anaxandridas II to give in to the demands of the ephors and gerousia and take a second wife.

=== Classical period ===
By at least the Classical period, the Assembly was involved in the election of public officials. These included the gerontes and "very probably" the ephors. The election of the gerontes, by the Assembly, is attested in the fourth century BC. A century earlier Herodotus had already connected the Assembly with elections, saying that for ten days after a Spartan king is buried, "there are no assemblies or elections". Plutarch, writing in the first century AD, places the election of the gerontes, by the Assembly, in the legendary past, attributing its establishment to Lycurgus. Plutarch describes the procedure for these elections as follows:

An assembly [ἐκκλησίας] of the people having been convened, chosen men were shut up in a room near by so that they could neither see nor be seen, but only hear the shouts of the assembly. For as in other matters, so here, the cries of the assembly decided between the competitors. These did not appear in a body, but each one was introduced separately, as the lot fell, and passed silently through the assembly. Then the secluded judges, who had writing-tablets with them, recorded in each case the loudness of the shouting, not knowing for whom it was given, but only that he was introduced first, second, or third, and so on. Whoever was greeted with the most and loudest shouting, him they declared elected.

In the fifth century BC, the most notable actions of the Assembly involve war with Athens. In the 470s, a debate was held in the Assembly concerning the issue of whether Sparta should go to war with Athens for control of the sea. According to Diodorus Siculus, "the younger men and the majority of the others were [at first] eager" for war, but were eventually persuaded otherwise. Thucydides describes a debate in the Assembly, in 432 BC, in which "the opinions of the majority all led to the same conclusion; the Athenians were open aggressors", and ended with the Assembly voting, by division, to declare war on Athens. The Assembly is recorded as being involved in several other significant events, in the fifth and fourth centuries—most regarding the issues of war and peace (see below).

Other than the Great Rhetra and the Tyrtaeus fragment, no general statements concerning the Spartan Assembly are found until the fourth century BC, in book two of Aristotle's Politics. Aristotle describes the Spartan Assembly as having "no powers except the function of confirming by vote the resolutions already formed by the Elders [gerousia]". In a following passage Aristotle says that, unlike at Carthage, where "anybody who wishes may speak against the proposals introduced", at Sparta (and Crete), the "people" must "merely ... sit and listen to the decisions that have been taken by their rulers".

=== Historical record: 540–243 BC ===
The historical record of events—as reported by Herodotus, Thucydides, Xenophon, Diodorus Siculus, and Plutarch—in which the Assembly is explicitly mentioned as being involved (or not involved) include the following:

Date	Actions (or noted non-actions) by the Assembly
540s	Ephors threaten to convene the Assembly in order to force king Anaxandridas II to accede to their demands concerning marriage.
480s	Consults regarding atonement for the murder of the Persian heralds sent by Darius; sends two Spartan volunteers to be executed by Darius's son Xerxes.
c. 475	Decides not to go to war with Athens, after initially being "eager" for war, but finally being persuaded otherwise.
432	Decides, by division, to declare war on Athens.
winter 418/417	Agrees to a peace treaty with Argos.
winter 415/414	Agrees to aid Syracuse in its war with Athens, after being addressed by envoys from Syracuse and Corinth, and also by Alcibiades on his own behalf.
405	Decides on the terms of a peace offer to Athens, after being convened by the ephors and addressed by envoys from Corinth and Thebes.
403	Dispatches a delegation to Athens to settle a dispute between two Athenian factions, after being addressed by both.
c. 402	Issues (jointly with the ephors?) an ultimatum to Elis.
399? 397	Cinadon conspiracy dealt with "without even convening the Little Assembly".
c. 389	Agrees to aid the Calydon Achaeans against the Acarnanians.
383	Agrees to aid Acanthus and Apollonia, after being convened by the ephors and addressed by envoys.
382	Decides to bring Ismenias to trial after being addressed by Leontiades of Thebes.
spring 371	Decides to make peace with Athens.
summer 371	Decides that the Spartan king Cleombrotus should march against Thebes.
c. 243	Convened by the ephor Lysander, because of a divided gerousia, to consider the proposed reforms of king Agis IV involving debt cancellations and land redistribution. Although the Assembly apparently favored these reforms, the Gerousia ultimately rejected them by one vote.

== Meetings ==
As Plutarch understood it, the Great Rhetra established regular meetings of the Assembly at a fixed time and place. However, exactly when and where these regular meetings took place is unknown. As to when meetings were held, Plutarch reports the Rhetra as saying that the Spartans shall apellazein (ἀπελλάζειν), horas ex horas (ὥρας ἐξ ὥρας). Plutarch explains apellazein as meaning the same as ekklesiazein (ἐκκλησιάζειν) 'to conduct an assembly', and is thought to be a denominal verb derived from the noun apellai (‘assembly’), with the Apellai being the name of an annual festival celebrated at Delphi. The phrase horas ex horas is a vague expression implying continual repetition of some specific time period, which could be used to mean 'every year', 'every month', 'every day' (or the like), or, more vaguely still, 'from time to time'. Although the festival of the Apellai is only attested for Delphi, based upon the widespread presence of the related month name Apellaios in Doric calendars, it was apparently a common festival among the Dorians, and from the use of word apellazein, it has been concluded that the meetings of the Assembly, as specified in the Rhetra, were to be held at the same time as the Spartan festival of the Apellai was celebrated. However, while the Delphic Apellai was celebrated yearly, the meetings of the Spartan Assembly were probably held (at least) monthly. Plutarch connects the word apellazein with Apollo, and the Apellai is widely thought to have been a festival of Apollo. According to Herodotus the Spartan kings sacrificed to Apollo "at each new moon and each seventh day of the first part of the month, ... from the public store". If either or both of these dates marked the Spartan Apellai, then perhaps the new moon or the seventh (or both) were dates of the regular meetings of the Assembly. Alternatively, a late scholiast to Thucydides (1.67.3), says the Assembly met at each full moon. The association of the Assembly with the festival of the Apellai has suggested to scholars that, because the Apellai was an annual festival at Delphi, there was an annual meeting of the Assembly at Sparta during which the highest annual public officials were elected. In addition to these regular meetings, a remark by Xenophon implies that the Assembly could also meet at other times when needed, since during the crisis of the Cinadon conspiracy, he says that the ephors did not even convene the "Little Assembly" (mikra ekklesia).

As quoted by Plutarch, the Rhetra specified that the meetings were to be held "between Babyca and Cnacion". Plutarch goes on to explain that: "The Babyca is now called Cheimarrus, and the Cnacion Oenus; but Aristotle says that Cnacion is a river, and Babyca a bridge. Between these they held their assemblies, having neither halls nor any other kind of building for the purpose." However these names are otherwise unknown, and where Babyca and Cnacion "actually were is a complete mystery". According to the second-century AD travel writer Pausanias, the Spartan Assembly met "even at the present day" in a structure called the Skias ('Canopy') located on a road leading from Sparta's market-place, and built by Theodorus of Samos (fl. c. 540 BC).

Meetings were probably convened and chaired by the ephors. As noted above, there are several references to the ephors convening the Assembly in the historical record. These include: the ephors' dispute with king Anaxandridas II (540s BC); the peace offer to Athens (405 BC); the Cinadon conspiracy (c. 399 BC); the sending of aid to Acanthus and Apollonia (383 BC); and the rejection of the proposed reforms of king Agis IV (c. 243 BC). Thucydides' description of the Assembly's decision to declare war on Athens in 432 BC has the ephor Sthenelaidas "put the question to the assembly" as well as determine the method of voting.

== Power and importance ==
The relative power and importance of the Spartan Assembly with respect to the kings, gerousia, and ephors is a matter of scholarly debate. During the Archaic period, as set forth in the Rhetra, the decision-making procedure was probouleutic, a practice common in Ancient Greece, by which proposals were first discussed in a council, and then voted on by a general assembly. Thus such an assembly was sovereign, in the sense that the assembly's consent was constitutionally required for certain state actions. In Sparta's case, according to the Rhetra, the Assembly could apparently also modify the proposals brought before it, subject to the possibility of their being vetoed by the gerousia.

As documented for the Classical period, the Assembly seems to have had supreme authority in foreign affairs, particularly matters of war and peace, something that Ste. Croix 1972 considered unsurprising given that the Assembly was "above all the organ of the collective warriors and ex-warriors". Nevertheless, at Sparta, the probouleutic bodies (i.e. the gerousia and the ephors) exerted more direct power over political decision-making—and thus the popular assembly less—than at Athens. In particular, the right of the gerousia, as described in the Rhetra, to block actions of the Assembly, could in theory have acted as a significant check on its power.

Aristotle seems to have viewed the Spartan Assembly during the fourth century BC as particularly weak. As noted above, in his Politics, he asserts that the Assembly has "no powers except the function of confirming by vote the resolutions already formed by the Elders [gerousia]". The verb Aristotle used for the Assembly's only power (translated above as "confirming by vote") is "συνεπιψηίσαι" which means to 'ratify by vote' (a law or resolution). According to Andrewes 1967, Aristotle's phrasing in this passage and the verb used, "rather suggest that he thought the assembly was a mere rubber stamp". Some scholars have seen Aristotle's view of a weak Assembly as in conflict–not only with the evidence concerning the Assembly from the Archaic period—but also with other reports from the fifth century through the time Aristotle is writing the Politics, in the fourth.

A related issue is to what extent genuine debates occurred in the Assembly and who had the right to speak. Here again there seems to be no scholarly consensus. Wade-Gery 1958 and Andrewes 1967 have seen in the historical record, examples of "plenty of talk" and "considerable debate", with Wade-Gery noting that, although the reported speakers are all officials, "it is gratuitous to suppose that they had to be". Conversely Ste. Croix 1972 sees only two occasions for which there is evidence of "any debate, let alone 'considerable debate' by Spartans" (as opposed to foreign speakers), and thinks it probable that ordinary members of the Assembly could speak only if invited to by the presiding ephor. Kennell 2010, while noting that "who the possessors of various 'opinions' mentioned by the historians were and whether they might have expressed them in debates remains unknown", concludes that, "although far from being a cockpit of free-wheeling debate and legislative initiative like the Athenian Assembly, the Spartan model was no mere rubber stamp for decisions of the magistrates."

In any case, although there is no scholarly consensus about the "balance of power among [Sparta's] deliberative bodies", as documented for the Classical period, the Assembly played a significant role. As Esu 2024 describes it, "Spartan deliberation was the result of a complex interaction" between the gerousia, ephors and the Assembly.

== Name ==
The official name for the popular assembly at Sparta—either 'the Ekklesia' or 'the Apella'—is disputed. Scholarly consensus had thought that its official name was 'the Apella'. As recently as 1972, Ste Croix could declare that the "Spartan Assembly is still commonly referred to as 'the Apella'". However following Wade-Gery 1958, Andrewes 1967, and Ste. Croix 1972, consensus shifted in favor of 'Ekklesia'. More recently, Welwei 1997 has revived the dispute, advocating in favor of 'Apella'.

The evidence from ancient sources is mixed. The common noun apella does not occur in the singular in any ancient text, with all known uses of the plural form apellai coming from Doric speaking regions of Greece. The lexicographer Hesychius (5th/6th century AD) explains the meaning of apellai with the gloss: sekoi, ekklesiai, archairesiai, where ekklesiai refers to official public assemblies, and archairesiai refers to assemblies for the election of magistrates. The only other occurrences of apellai are in the Labyad inscription (late fifth to fourth century BC) of Delphi, which mentions an Apellai festival, as well as two first-century BC inscriptions from Sparta's former seaport town of Gytheion, which contain the formulaic expression used to introduce official decrees of the people's assembly: "ἔδοξε τῶι δάμωι" ('it was decided by the people'), followed by: "ἐν ταῖς μεγάλαις ἀπελλαῖς" ('at the great apellai'). As mentioned above, Plutarch explained the apparently related word apellazein (ἀπελλάζειν), as being "a reference to Apollo", and meaning the same as ekklesiazein (ἐκκλησιάζειν) 'to conduct an assembly'. From this evidence, some scholars have inferred that the common noun apella meant 'assembly' in Sparta's Doric dialect, with Apella becoming the proper noun naming the Spartan popular assembly.

The most important evidence in support of the name Ekklesia comes from the contemporary literary sources, particularly Thucydides and Xenophon, which consistently call the Spartan Assembly ekklesia. Thucydides lists the eight terms of a treaty of peace and defensive alliance with Argos in 418/17 BC, with the introduction: "The assembly [ἐκκλησίᾳ] of the Lacedaemonians agrees to treat with the Argives upon the terms following". Other important evidence comes from Xenophon, who, according to Ste. Croix, "knew his Sparta very well indeed". Twice Xenophon mentions decisions as being by "the ephors and the assembly [ekklesia]". Xenophon, in his account of the Cinadon conspiracy, also refers to a little ekklesia, with the qualifier ("καλουμένην", 'so called'), which seems to imply that the "Little Ekklesia" was the name of some Spartan institution (otherwise unknown), with the adjective 'little' needed to distinguish it from the "Great Ekklesia", or simply the "Ekklesia".

Luther 2006, while concluding that Sparta's popular assembly was probably called the Ekklesia, has suggested that an annual meeting of the Assembly during which public officials were elected may have been called the Apellai. Nevertheless, according to Nafissi 2010, current consensus "based on ancient evidence" still favors 'Ekklesia'.

== Bibliography ==
- Andrewes, A. (1967), "The Government of Classical Sparta", in Ancient Society and Institutions: Studies Presented to Victor Ehrenberg on his 75th Birthday, Barnes & Noble, 1967. Internet Archive.
- Andrewes, A. (1970), p. 134 in A Historical Commentary on Thucydides. Vol. 4: Books V25-VII A. W. Gomme, A. Andrewes, and K. J. Dover (eds.), Oxford University Press, Oxford, 1970. ISBN 9780198141785.
- Aristotle, Politics in Aristotle in 23 Volumes, vol. 21, translated by H. Rackham, London, William Heinemann Ltd. 1944. Online version at the Perseus Digital Library.
- Beekes, Robert (2009), Etymological Dictionary of Greek, 2 vols. Leiden: Brill, 2009. Internet Archive.
- Burkert, Walter (1975), Apellai und Apollon, RhM 118, 1975, pp. 1-21. JSTOR 41244803.
- The Cambridge Greek Lexicon, edited by J. Diggle et al, Cambridge University Press, 2021 ISBN 978-0-521-82680-8.
- Cartledge, Paul (1987), Agesilaos and the Crisis of Sparta, Baltimore, Johns Hopkins University Press, 1987. ISBN 0-8018-3505-4. Internet Archive.
- Cartledge, Paul (2015), s.v. Apellai (1), s.v. Apellai (2), published online 22 December 2015, in the Oxford Classical Dictionary, edited by Tim Whitmarsh, digital ed, New York, Oxford University Press. ISBN 978-0-19-938113-5.
- Dillery, John, "Xenophon: the Small Works", in The Cambridge Companion to Xenophon, ed. Michael A. Flower, Cambridge University Press, Cambridge, 2017, ISBN 9781107279308.
- Diodorus Siculus, Library of History, Volume III: Books 4.59-8, translated by C. H. Oldfather, Loeb Classical Library No. 340, Cambridge, Massachusetts, Harvard University Press, 1939. ISBN 978-0-674-99375-4. Online version at Harvard University Press.
- Diodorus Siculus, Library of History, Volume IV: Books 9-12.40, translated by C. H. Oldfather Loeb Classical Library 375. Cambridge, Massachusetts, Harvard University Press, 1946. ISBN 978-0-674-99413-3. Online version at Harvard University Press.
- Ehrenberg, Victor (1968), From Solon to Socrates: Greek History and Civilization During the Sixth and Fifth Centuries B.C., London, Methuen, 1968. Internet Archive.
- Esu, Alberto (2024), Divided Power in Ancient Greece: Decision-Making and Institutions in the Classical and Hellenistic Polis, Oxford University Press, 2024. ISBN 9780191992056. doi:10.1093/oso/9780198883951.001.0001.
- Gomme, Arnold Wycombe, Theodore John Cadoux, and P. J. Rhodes (2015), s.v. ekklēsia, published online 22 December 2015, in the Oxford Classical Dictionary, edited by Tim Whitmarsh, digital ed, New York, Oxford University Press. ISBN 978-0-19-938113-5.
- Hamilton, Charles D., Agesilaus and the Failure of Spartan Hegemony, NY: Cornell University Press, 1991. ISBN 0-8014-2540-9.
- Herodotus, Histories, A. D. Godley (translator), Cambridge, Massachusetts: Harvard University Press, 1920; ISBN 0674991338. Online version at the Perseus Digital Library.
- Kelly, D. H., "Policy-Making in the Spartan Assembly", in Antichthon Volume 15, 1981, pp. 47-61.
- Kennell, Nigel M. (2010), Spartans: A New History, Wiley Blackwell, 2010. ISBN 978-1-4051-2999-2.
- Liddell, Henry George, Robert Scott, A Greek-English Lexicon, revised and augmented throughout by Sir Henry Stuart Jones with the assistance of Roderick McKenzie, Clarendon Press Oxford, 1940. Online version at the Perseus Digital Library.
- Luther, Andreas, (2006), "Der Name der Volksversammlung in Sparta", in Das frühe Sparta, Andrew Luther, Mischa Meier, and Lukas Thommen (eds.), Franz Steiner Verlag, Munich, 2006, pp. 73–88.
- Nafissi, Massimo (2010), "The Great Rhetra (Plut. Lyc. 6): A Retrospective and Intentional Construct?", in Intentional History: Spinning Time in Ancient Greece, Lin Foxhall, Hans-Joachim Gehrke, and Nino Luraghi (eds.), Franz Steiner Verlag, 2010.
- Nilsson, Martin (1906), Griechische Feste von religiöser Bedeutung, mit Ausschluss der attischen, Leipzig, B. G. Teubner, 1906. Internet Archive.
- Nilsson, Martin (1967), Geschichte der griechischen Religion, München Beck, 1967 (1955). ISBN 3-406-01370-8. Internet Archive
- Pausanias, Description of Greece with an English Translation by W.H.S. Jones, Litt.D., and H.A. Ormerod, M.A., in 4 Volumes. Cambridge, Massachusetts, Harvard University Press; London, William Heinemann Ltd. 1918. Online version at the Perseus Digital Library.
- Plutarch, Agis, in Plutarch: Lives, Volume X: Agis and Cleomenes, Tiberius and Gaius Gracchus, Philopoemen and Flamininus, translated by Bernadotte Perrin, Loeb Classical Library No. 102, Cambridge, Massachusetts, Harvard University Press, 1921. ISBN 978-0-674-99113-2. Online version at Harvard University Press.
- Plutarch, Lycurgus, in Plutarch: Lives, Volume I: Theseus and Romulus, Lycurgus and Numa, Solon and Publicola, translated by Bernadotte Perrin, Loeb Classical Library No. 46, Cambridge, Massachusetts, Harvard University Press, 1914. ISBN 978-0-674-99052-4. Online version at the Perseus Digital Library.
- Raaflaub, Kurt A. and Rober W. Wallace (2007), '"People's Power" and Egalitarian Trends in Archaic Greece', in Origins of Democracy in Ancient Greece, Eds.: Kurt A. Raaflaub, Josiah Ober, Robert W. Wallace, University of California Press, 2007. ISBN 9780520245624.
- Rhodes (2006), s.v. Ekklesia, in Brill’s New Pauly Online, Antiquity volumes edited by: Hubert Cancik and, Helmuth Schneider, English Edition by: Christine F. Salazar, Classical Tradition volumes edited by: Manfred Landfester, English Edition by: Francis G. Gentry, published online: 2006.
- Schulz, Fabian (2009), "Lykurgs Reform ohne Demokratie ? Zwei Konjekturen der Rhetra", in Ktèma : civilisations de l'Orient, de la Grèce et de Rome antiques, N°34, 2009. pp. 333–349.
- Ste. Croix, G. E. M. de (1972), The Origins of the Peloponnesian War, Duckworth, London, 2001 (1972). ISBN 0-7156-1728-1.
- Thucydides, The Peloponnesian War. London, J. M. Dent; New York, E. P. Dutton. 1910. Online version at the Perseus Digital Library.
- Tyrtaeus, Eunomia fr. 4, in Greek Elegiac Poetry: From the Seventh to the Fifth Centuries BC, edited and translated by Douglas E. Gerber, Loeb Classical Library No. 258, Cambridge, Massachusetts, Harvard University Press, 1999. ISBN 978-0-674-99582-6. Online version at Harvard University Press.
- Unz, Ron K. (1986), "The Chronology of the Elean War", Greek, Roman, and Byzantine Studies, Vol. 27 No. 1 (1986), pp. 29–42.
- van Hilten-Rutten 2020, "Tyrtaeus the Lawgiver? Plutarch and Diodorus Siculus on Tyrtaeus fr. 4", in The Reception of Greek Lyric Poetry in the Ancient World: Transmission, Canonization and Paratext, eds. Bruno Currie, and Ian Rutherford, Brill, Linden, Boston, 2020. ISBN 978-90-04-41451-8.
- Wade-Gery (1958), Essays in Greek History Basil Blackwell, Oxford, 1958. Internet Archive
- Welwei, Karl-Wilhelm (1997), "Apella oder Ekklesia? Zur Bezeichnung der spartanischen Volksversammlung", in Rheinisches Museum für Philologie 140 (1997), H. 3/4, 242–249. JSTOR 41234282.
- Welwei, Karl-Wilhelm (2000), Polis und Arché: kleine Schriften zu Gesellschafts- und Herrschaftsstrukturen in der griechischen Welt, Franz Steiner Verlag, 2000. ISBN 9783515077590, ISBN 3-515-07759-6.
- Welwei, Karl-Wilhelm (2006), s.v. Apella, Apellai, in Brill's New Pauly Online, Antiquity volumes edited by: Hubert Cancik and, Helmuth Schneider, English Edition by: Christine F. Salazar, Classical Tradition volumes edited by: Manfred Landfester, English Edition by: Francis G. Gentry, published online: 2006.
- West, M. L., ed. (1972), Iambi et Elegi Graeci, Volume 2, Oxford University Press. 1972. Internet Archive.
- West, M. L. (1974), Studies in Greek Elegy and Iambus, Walter de Gruyter, Berlin, 1974. ISBN 3-11-004585-0.
- Xenophon, Hellenica, Volume I: Books 1-4, translated by Carleton L. Brownson, Loeb Classical Library No. 88, Cambridge, Massachusetts, Harvard University Press, 1918. ISBN 978-0-674-99098-2. Online version at Harvard University Press.
- Xenophon, Hellenica, Volume II: Books 5-7, translated by Carleton L. Brownson, Loeb Classical Library No. 89, Cambridge, Massachusetts, Harvard University Press, 1921. ISBN 978-0-674-99098-2. Online version at Harvard University Press.
