= Sthenelaidas =

Spartan ephor in 432 BC

Sthenelaidas (Ancient Greek: Σθενελαίδας) was a Spartan who held the office of ephor in 432 BC. He is best known for having spoken in favour of initiating the Peloponnesian War against Athens.

== Life ==
Sthenelaidas was either elected ephor for the year 433/432 – perhaps as eponymous ephor – or in 432/431, when the eponymous was Aenesias. The majority of modern scholars incline for the latter date.

In late 432, Sthenelaidas presided over a session of the apella, during which the issue of war against Athens was debated. The king Archidamus II wanted to temporise, saying that Sparta was not ready for war, but Sthenelaidas made an aggressive speech calling for war immediately. The events are developed in details by Thucydides in a famous passage of his History of the Peloponnesian War, where he invented a series of speeches summarising the position of each protagonist. Thucydides wrote a long speech for Archidamus, implicitly compared to Pericles for his statesman's qualities, but makes Sthenelaidas pronounce a few laconic sentences insisting on the need for Sparta to rapidly support its allies against Athens.

A first vote took place on whether Athens had broken peace, but its result where inconclusive, because the Spartans voted by shouting. Sthenelaidas then asked for a division. As most of the Spartans were afraid to appear weak by favouring peace, they moved to the group in favour of the war. Sthenelaidas therefore won the vote by a large majority. Sparta then sent an embassy to the Pythia in Delphi to obtain Apollo's support for a war against Athens. A congress of the Peloponnesian League was subsequently called and formally declared war.

Ernst Badian has nevertheless suggested that Thucydides distorted the events. Sthenelaidas' motion put to vote was not for or against war, but on whether Athens had broken the Thirty Years' Peace, which had been concluded in 445 between Athens and Sparta. The motion is likely authentic as Athenian ambassadors present in Sparta this day reported it to their city, from where Thucydides learnt about it, but it contradicts Sthenelaidas' invented speech, which called for immediate intervention. Badian adds that the motion did not make war inevitable, as several Spartan embassies to Athens are recorded the following year.

Sthenelaidas is the first known Spartan outside the royal families to play a decisive role in shaping Sparta's foreign policy since Hetoimaridas, geronte in 475, and Chilon, ephor c. 556 BC. He was the father of the Spartan general Alcamenes, who probably inherited his hawkish stance against Athens.

== Bibliography ==
=== Modern sources ===
- Ernst Badian, From Plataea to Potidaea, Studies in the History and Historiography of the Pentecontaetia, Baltimore/London, Johns Hopkins University Press, 1993.
- Cinzia Bearzot & Franca Landucci Gattinoni (editors), Contro le "leggi immutabili" : gli Spartani fra tradizione e innovazione, Contributi di storia antica 2, Milano, V & P università, 2004. ISBN 88-343-1985-0
- Giovanni Parmeggiani, "How Sparta and Its Allies Went to War: Votes and Diplomacy in 432–1 B. C.", Historia, 67, 2018/2, pp. 244–255.
- Françoise Ruzé & Jacqueline Christien, Sparte, Histoire, mythe, géographie, Malakoff, Armand Colin, 2017. ISBN 2-200-61814-X
- G. E. M. de Ste. Croix, The Origins of the Peloponnesian War, London, Duckworth, 1972. ISBN 0-7156-0640-9

=== Ancient sources ===
- Thucydides. History of the Peloponnesian War . Translated by Crawley, Richard – via Wikisource.
