= Apellai =

Ancient Greek festival

The Apellai (Ancient Greek: ἀπέλλαι), was an ancient annual family festival of the Northwest Greeks, at least at Delphi, similar to the Ionian Apaturia. The festival was apparently spread by the Dorians as inferred by the use of the month name Apellaios in various Dorian localities. Sacrificial animals, called apellaia, seem to have been offered at the Apellai on the occasion of a youth becoming an adult. It is thought to have been a festival of Apollo.

== Usage, meaning, and etymology ==
The word apellai occurs only in the plural, with all known uses of the word coming from Doric speaking regions of Greece. It occurs in the Labyad inscription (late fifth to fourth century BC) of Delphi, as well as two first-century BC inscriptions from Sparta's seaport town of Gytheion.

The lexicographer Hesychius (5th/6th century AD) explains the meaning of the word apellai with the gloss: sekoi, ekklesiai, archairesiai. The word sekos (plural sekoi) can refer to various kinds of enclosures, while ekklesiai refers to official public assemblies, and archairesiai refers, more specifically, to public assemblies for the election of magistrates. In light of Heschius's explanation of the apellai in terms of such assemblies, Heschius's sekoi might be interpreted as referring to either the entire enclosure within which such assemblies were held, or the subdivisions of such assemblies into precincts (e.g. voting precincts). The infinitive apellazein (ἀπελλάζειν), is thought to be a denominal verb derived from the noun apellai, occurs in the Lycurgean Great Rhetra (c. 700 BC?) of Sparta, which Plutarch explains is "a reference to Apollo" meaning ekklesiazein (ἐκκλησιάζειν), i.e. 'to conduct an assembly'. The use of the word apellai in the two first-century BC inscriptions from Gytheion helps to confirm the explanations given by Hesychius and Plutarch. Both inscriptions contain the formulaic expression used to introduce official decrees of the people's assembly: "ἔδοξε τῶι δάμωι" ('it was decided by the people'), followed by: "ἐν ταῖς μεγάλαις ἀπελλαῖς" ('at the great apellai').

The etymology of the word apellai is unknown. According to Robert Beekes, "a connection with IE *h_{2}pel- would be the most easy solution, but there are no obvious cognates for such a root." Another Hesychius gloss explains the (related?) word apellein with the word apokleiein, a form of the verb apokleio (ἀποκλειω) that means 'shut out', 'close', 'shut away'. According to Beekes this "may well provide the original meaning of ἀπέλλαι, 'enclosed space, meeting place'."

== Festival ==
The only explicit mention of a festival called the Apellai occurs in the Labyad inscription, which records the law of the Ladyadai, a familial group at Delphi assumed to be similar to an Ionian phratry. The first month of the Delphic calendar was called Apellaios (Ἀπελλαῖος), and the inscription mentions an Apellai festival at Delphi held during that month at which the Labyaidai feasted. The inscription regulates the procedures for admission of members into the Ladyadai (as overseen by certain officials called the tagoi), which required the formal approval, of both the entire Ladyadai, and the particular subgroup (patria) to which the new member would belong, and which seem to have involved three points of admission: marriage, the birth of a (probably male) child, and passage into adulthood.

In particular, the inscription regulates the "offerings of sacrificial victims and of cakes". The "sacrificial victims" were animal sacrifices called apellaia (ἀπελλαῖα), which are to be brought and received only on the day of the Apellai, and the inscription prescribes that if the presiding Labyad officials (tagoi) were to "receive them on a day other than the Apellai, each of them is to pay a fine of 10 drachmas", while the cake offerings (called daratai) were to be made by Ladyadai "on the occasion of marriages or children". From this it has been concluded that the Apellai were the Delphic equivalent of the Ionian festival of the Apaturia, at which the formal admission of new adult members of a phratry occurred.

The Apellai, as the name of a festival, is only attested for Delphi, however the month name Apellaios was widespread among the Dorians, from which it has been inferred that the Apellai was also widespread. In addition to Delphi, localities where the month name Apellaios is attested include, in Central Greece, Ozolian Locrian Chaleion, Oianthea, and Tolophon, and Phthiotic Lamia and Oitaia, in the Peloponnese, Argos and Epidaurus, the island of Tenos in the Aegean, Olus on Crete, Heraclea in the Lucanian region of Southern Italy, Tauromenion in Sicily, and Bithynian Chalcedon in Anatolia.

Although Apellaios is not one of the eleven attested month names of the Spartan calendar, the Apellai is also generally thought to have been a festival celebrated at Dorian Sparta. Plutarch's use of the verb apellazein in his description of the Great Rhetra, has been understood to mean that the Spartan political assembly, was held during the festival of the Apellai. From the use of the term 'great apellai' (megalai apellai) in the Gytheion inscriptions mentioned above, it has been inferred that, at Sparta, there were also 'lesser apellai'. Wade-Gery further suggested that the Spartan 'great apellai' was held annually, while 'lesser apellai' were held monthly.

== Apollo ==
As noted above, Plutarch connects the word apellazein with Apollo, and the Apellai is widely thought to have been a festival of Apollo. In 1912, Jane Ellen Harrison argued that Apollo was intimately associated with the Apellai and the sacrificial apellaia, concluding that Apollo was "the projection of these rites", although, Martin P. Nilsson, more than fifty years later, would assert that Apollo played only a minor role (geringe Rolle) in the Apellai, and that there was no reason to assume that the festival really belonged to Apollo.

Harrison's argument (revived and elucidated by Walter Burkert in 1975) is based partly on etymological grounds. From the fact that "Apollo's name had an earlier form Apellon", Harrison concluded that the theonym Apollo was derived from the word apellai. Which would make the name 'Apollo' mean something like 'he of the apellai', and thus from Hesychius' gloss, 'he of the assembly'. Given that, based upon the Labyad inscription, the apellaia, were "the offerings made at puberty initiation" at the Delphic Apellai, Harrison further concluded that Apollo was a projection of the central figure in these rites—the initiate—that Apollo was "the arch-ephebos, the Megistos Kouros". That Apollo was typically depicted as a long-haired adolescent (kouros) provides "powerful" support for Harrison's conclusion. However—while not ruling out that the Apellai was a festival of Apollo—Beekes argues that the derivation of 'Apollo' from apellai is, nevertheless, "linguistically and historically impossible".

== See also ==
- Ancient Macedonian calendar
