= Anthony Andrews (disambiguation) =

Anthony Andrews (born 1948) is an English actor.

Anthony Andrews may also refer to:

- Anthony Andrews (cricketer) (born 1967), Jamaican cricketer
- Anthony Andrews (football manager) (born 1996), Indian football manager

== See also ==
- Antony Andrewes (1910–1990), English classical scholar and historian
