= Alcamenes (disambiguation) =

Alcamenes or Alcmenes may refer to:

- Alcamenes, Athenian sculptor of the 5th century BC
- Alcmenes, Agiad king of Sparta from the 8th century BC
- Alcamenes, son of Sthenelaides, Spartan general in the 5th century BC
