= Pelanor =

Currency used in ancient Sparta

Pelanor (Ancient Greek: πέλανορ, lit. 'cakes') was the currency reportedly used in Sparta during the reign of the semi-mythical Lycurgus. According to Plutarch's Life of Lycurgus, not only did Lycurgus ban the use of gold and silver currency in favor of iron, but, just as the iron was red hot, it would be quenched in vinegar, thus rendering the metal unusable for any other purpose than money. This reduced the incidence of robbery and theft in Sparta, reports Plutarch, since the currency was difficult to transport and (because of its brittleness) lacked any intrinsic value as scrap metal.

Also according to Plutarch, the Spartan iron coin weighed an Aeginetan mina — about 1.5 pounds avoirdupois (0.68 kg) — and had the value of four khalkoi (half an Attic obol). Hesychius's Lexicon repeats this claim.

Smith's Dictionary of Greek and Roman Antiquities (1890) reports that "no gold, silver, or copper coins of Sparta of an earlier date than [310 BC] are extant."

In the early 20th century, Kurt Regling claimed to have recovered metal ingot currency (aes rude) from Spartan archaeological sites, although it was not specified to have been brittle or in any way different from aes rude found elsewhere in Greece.

== See also ==
- Fiat currency
- Metal theft
