= Conspiracy of Cinadon =

399 BC attempted coup in Sparta, ancient Greece

The conspiracy of Cinadon was an attempted coup d'état which took place in Sparta in 399 BC early in the reign of Eurypontid King Agesilaus II (400–c. 360 BC). The leader was Cinadon (Ancient Greek: Κινάδων), who was a trusted member of the king's bodyguard, but not a full citizen. The conspiracy aimed to break the power of the Spartan elite and give rights to a broader range of Lacedaemonians. Although elaborately organized, the plot was in the end betrayed to the ephors; they cracked down on the conspirators, and Cinadon himself was punished, possibly executed. The only significant source for this event is Xenophon's Hellenica, though it is mentioned by Polyaenus and Aristotle.

== Conspirators ==
Cinadon was a young man, described as "fine in body and brave in spirit", but "not one of the equals" (homoioi, also translated as "peers"). Though of a lower status (which is not named), he appears to have been a member of the king's bodyguard and was, at times, sent on missions for the city. He was a valued and respected person, and therefore resented not being of the highest class of citizen (Spartiate). He was joined in the conspiracy by helots (feudal serfs), neodamoideis (new citizens, freedmen), hypomeiones (subordinate citizens), and periokoi (those who live around - in outlying towns). The only other named conspirator was Teisamenos, a seer. His status was not given.

== Discovery of the plot ==
During a sacrifice presided over by King Agesilaus II and an unnamed seer (Teisamenos?), the omens proved to be very bad. Xenophon bluntly indicated that the seer foresaw "a most terrible conspiracy". Several days later, an unnamed man denounced the conspiracy of Cinadon to the ephors, saying that he had accompanied Cinadon to the agora, where Cinadon had asked him to count the Spartiates in the crowd of about 4,000 assembled there. Cinadon thus indicated that only 40 people present were peers – comprising the king, ephors, gerousia, and other full citizens, and that these 40 were significantly outnumbered. He also stated that the Spartans proper were the enemy of the vast majority of the crowd, who were therefore potential allies of the conspirators. The informer added that Cinadon had gathered around himself a number of other disaffected men (of those classes listed above) who also hated the Spartans, "for whenever among these classes any mention was made of Spartiatae, no one was able to conceal the fact that he would be glad to eat them raw". The informer added that while only some conspirators were armed, the rest had access to tools and implements that could serve as makeshift weapons, such as axes and sickles.

The ephors did not immediately arrest Cinadon for fear that this would precipitate the revolt. By means of an elaborate ruse, they sent him to the Elean frontier at Aulon in Messenia. His escort was composed of members of the king's guard carefully selected by their commander. An additional detachment of cavalry (hippeis) was sent along as reinforcements. Cinadon was interrogated at Aulon, whereupon he revealed the names of the principal co-conspirators. When word came back to Sparta, they were then arrested. On Cinadon's return to Sparta, he was further questioned until all his accomplices were named. Cinadon and the conspirators were then bound, collared, and "led around the city, struck with whips and goads as they went". When asked about the reason for his coup, Cinadon replied that it was so that he might be inferior to no one in Lacedaemonia.

Polyaenus, in his short version of this event (cited above), added that the when the ephors received word from Aulon, they "ordered the execution of the other conspirators while he was still absent, and in this way they suppressed the conspiracy without any resistance". Where he got this information is not known.

== Bibliography ==
- E. David, "The Conspiracy of Cinadon". Athenæeum 57 (1979), p. 239–259
- Dustin A. Gish, "Spartan Justice: the Conspiracy of Kinadon in Xenophon's Hellenika," Polis 26, no. 2 (2009): 339–369. PDF accessible from https://www.academia.edu/937041/Spartan_Justice_The_Conspiracy_of_Kinadon_in_Xenophons_Hellenika_.
- J.F. Lazenby, "The Conspiracy of Cinadon reconsidered". Athenæum 55 (1977), p. 437–443
- (in French) Edmond Lévy. Sparte : histoire politique et sociale jusqu’à la conquête romaine. Seuil, "Points Histoire" collection, Paris, 2003 (ISBN 2-02-032453-9)
- (in Italian) R. Vattone, "Problemi spartani. La congiura di Cinadone". RSA 12 (1982), p. 19–52.
