= Endius =

5th-century BC Spartan magistrate

Endius (Ancient Greek: Ἔνδιος; Endios) was a Spartan ephor (magistrate) during the Peloponnesian War (431–404 BC).

Endius was a son of Alcibiades, member of a family whose connection with that of the Athenian Alcibiades had in a previous generation introduced into the latter this Lacedaemonian name. Apparently he was one of the three ambassadors sent by Sparta in 420 BC to dissuade Athens from entering into an alliance with Argos. They were chosen, says Thucydides, from the belief of their being acceptable to the Athenians, and possibly in particular with a view to conciliate his guest, Alcibiades, who probably made use of this very advantage in effecting the deception by which he defeated their purpose.

He was elected ephor in the autumn of 413 BC, the time of the Athenian disaster at Syracuse. And through him Alcibiades now inflicted on his country the severe blow of bringing the Lacedaemonians to the coast of Ionia, which otherwise may have been postponed. His influence decided the government to lend its support to Chios; and when the blockade of their ships in Piraeus seemed likely to put a stop to all operations, he again persuaded Endius and his colleagues to make the attempt. Thucydides says that Alcibiades was his patrikos es ta malista xenos; so that probably it was with him that Alcibiades resided during his stay at Sparta.

To these facts we may venture to add from Diodorus the further statement, that after the defeat at Cyzicus in 410 BC, he was sent from Sparta at the head of an embassy to Athens with reasonable proposals for peace, which were rejected thanks to the influence of the presumptuous demagogue Cleophon.

Endius, as the friend of Alcibiades, the victor of Cyzicus, would naturally be selected; and the account of Diodorus, with the exception of the oration he writes for Endius, may, notwithstanding the silence of Xenophon, be regarded as generally true.
