= Karl-Wilhelm Welwei =

German historian (1930–2013)

Karl-Wilhelm Welwei (17 October 1930 – 25 August 2013) was a German historian. He was regarded as one of the most notable experts on the history of Ancient Greece.

== Biography ==
Welwei was born on 17 October 1930 in Witten. He studied history and classical philology at the University of Cologne. In 1963, he received a PhD under the tutorage of Hans Volkmann, and earned his habilitation in 1970 at the Ruhr-Universität Bochum. Between 1972 and 1996 he was Professor of Ancient History. Since 1993 he has been a member of the German Archaeological Institute.

Many of Welwei's books, including Die griechische Polis, Athen, Das klassische Athen have reached a standard status. The focus of his research, in addition to Ancient Greece are the Republic and Imperial epochs of Ancient Rome.

== Works ==
Books

- Athen. Vom neolithischen Siedlungsplatz zur archaischen Großpolis. Wissenschaftliche Buchgesellschaft, Darmstadt 1992, ISBN 3-534-07541-2.
- Die griechische Frühzeit 2000 bis 500 v. Chr. (Becksche Reihe; 2185). 2nd Edition. Beck Wissen, München 2007, ISBN 978-3-406-47985-4.
- Die griechische Polis. Verfassung und Gesellschaft in archaischer und klassischer Zeit. 2nd Edition. Verlag Steiner, Stuttgart 1998, ISBN 3-515-07174-1.
- Das klassische Athen. Demokratie und Machtpolitik im 5. und 4. Jahrhundert v. Chr. Primus-Verlag, Darmstadt 1999, ISBN 3-89678-117-0.
- Sparta. Aufstieg und Niedergang einer antiken Großmacht. Klett-Cotta, Stuttgart 2004, ISBN 3-608-94016-2.

Essays

- Römische Herrschaftsideologie und augusteische Germanienpolitik. In: Gymnasium Volume 93, 1986, p. 118 ff.
- The Peloponnesian War and its Aftermath. In: Konrad Kinzl (Hrsg.): A Companion to the Classical Greek World. Blackwell, Malden, Ma. 2008, ISBN 978-0-631-23014-4.
