= Alcamenes, son of Sthenelaides =

5th-century BC Spartan general

Alcamenes (Greek: Ἀλκαμένης), son of Sthenelaidas, was appointed by Agis II as harmost of the Lesbians when they wished to revolt from the Athenians in 412 BC. When Alcamenes put to sea with twenty-one ships to sail to Chios, he was pursued by the Athenian fleet off the Isthmus of Corinth, and driven on shore. The Athenians attacked the ships when on shore, and Alcamenes was killed in the battle.
