= Lycurgus =

Traditional founder of Sparta's institutions

Lycurgus (/laɪˈkɜːrɡəs/; Ancient Greek: Λυκοῦργος Lykourgos) was the legendary lawgiver of Sparta, credited with the formation of its eunomia ('good order'), involving political, economic, and social reforms to produce a military-oriented Spartan society in accordance with the Delphic oracle. The Spartans in the historical period honoured him as a god.

As a historical figure, almost nothing is known for certain about him, including when he lived and what he did in life. The stories about him place him at multiple times. Nor is it clear when the political reforms attributed to him, called the Great Rhetra, occurred. Ancient dates range from – putting aside the implausibly early Xenophonic 11th century BC – the early ninth century (c. 885 BC) to as late as early eighth century (c. 776 BC). There remains no consensus as to when he lived; some modern scholars deny he existed at all.

The reforms at various times attributed to him touch all aspects of Spartan society. They included the creation of the Spartan constitution (in most traditions after the dual monarchy), the imposition of the Spartan mess halls called syssitia, the redistribution of land to each citizen by head, Spartan austerity and frugality, and Sparta's unique wedding and funerary customs. None of these reforms can be concretely attributed to Lycurgus. Most of the reforms likely date to the late sixth century BC (shortly before 500 BC), postdating his supposed life by centuries; some of the reforms, such as for the redistribution of land, are fictitious.

The extent of the Lycurgan myth emerges from Sparta's self-justification, seeking to endow its customs with timeless and divinely sanctioned antiquity. That antiquity was also malleable, reinvented at various times to justify the new as a return to Lycurgus' ideal society: his land reforms, for example, are attested only after the reformist Spartan monarchs Agis IV and Cleomenes III who sought to redistribute Sparta's land. The reforms attributed to Lycurgus, however, have been praised by ancients and moderns alike, seeing at various times different morals projected on a figure of which so little concrete can be known.

== Biography ==
=== Historicity and chronology ===
Possible dates for when Lycurgus lived, years before AD 1, with the classical authors who give each date attributed.

A multitude of ancient sources mention Lycurgus; it is, however, troubling inasmuch as those accounts evolved according to then-contemporary political priorities and that they are profoundly inconsistent. The oldest is that of Herodotus, who wrote in the latter half of the fifth century BC. His account is likely based on oral accounts from both Spartans and non-Spartans in Greece. The two royal dynasties of Sparta, the Agiads and Eurypontids, both claimed Lycurgus in their ancestries.

However, Lycurgus does not feature in the earliest preserved Spartan source – the poet Tyrtaeus – which has led many historians today to doubt his historicity: for example, Massimo Nafissi in A Companion to Sparta writes he is "probably mythical". Others have attempted to glean from the myths that survive some kernel of truth. But most historians "would subscribe to the stark judgement of Antony Andrewes: 'if there was a real Lycurgus, we know nothing of him'".

There is no consensus as to when a historical Lycurgus lived, neither today or in the ancient world (Plutarch, in his Life of Lycurgus, in fact makes this remark in the opening paragraph). Most attempts to date his life are based on when the Great Rhetra, which promulgated Lycurgus' reforms, occurred. The most accepted date in the ancient world was that based on the genealogy of Ephorus and the chronology of Eratosthenes, which dated the rhetra to 118 years after the reign of one of Sparta's founding kings, Procles, which corresponds to c. 885 BC. Alternatively, an excursus in the 5th century BC Greek historian Thucydides' Archaeology indicates that the reforms were instituted some four hundred years prior to the end of the Peloponnesian war, placing them to 804 or 821 BC. The 4th century BC Greek general Xenophon, on the other hand, claimed that he was also responsible for the creation of the Lacedaemonian dual monarchy, placing him during the reign of the Heraclid kings Eurysthenes and Procles, dated to c. 1003 BC. Modern scholars generally date the Great Rhetra to before the First Messenian War, placing it prior to 736 BC. Little consensus exists for any more specificity. Nor should Lycurgus necessarily be credited with, and therefore dated to, the rhetra: it may have been a charter created some time in the seventh century to justify and ennoble with antiquity Sparta's institutions, especially after Sparta's emergence as the most powerful state in Greece.

One artefact, the Disc of Iphitos, also allegedly documents Lycurgus' involvement with the formation of the Olympic Games and would therefore place him c. 776 BC, per the philosopher Aristotle. The disc, however, is likely a forgery from the fourth century BC. The ancients had two solutions for this lack of chronological clarity: the historian Timaeus posited two Lycurguses: one who did the reforms and a later one with the same name who was present at the first Olympics. Eratosthenes instead posited the disc reflected informal Olympics held before 776 BC.

The tradition in Sparta of Lycurgus' existence dates to some time between the archaic age and the fifth century. Inasmuch as no Lycurgus is mentioned in Tyrtaeus, it is likely that the legend dates to shortly after Tyrtaeus' time, and therefore the late seventh or early sixth century. It likely emerged from Spartan success in that period and a desire to explain it. His legend was also constantly reworked and expanded through the course of the classical Greek period by securing for Spartans in their times divine sanction and greater legitimacy for actions which they claimed to be a return to Lycurgus' laws.

=== Life ===
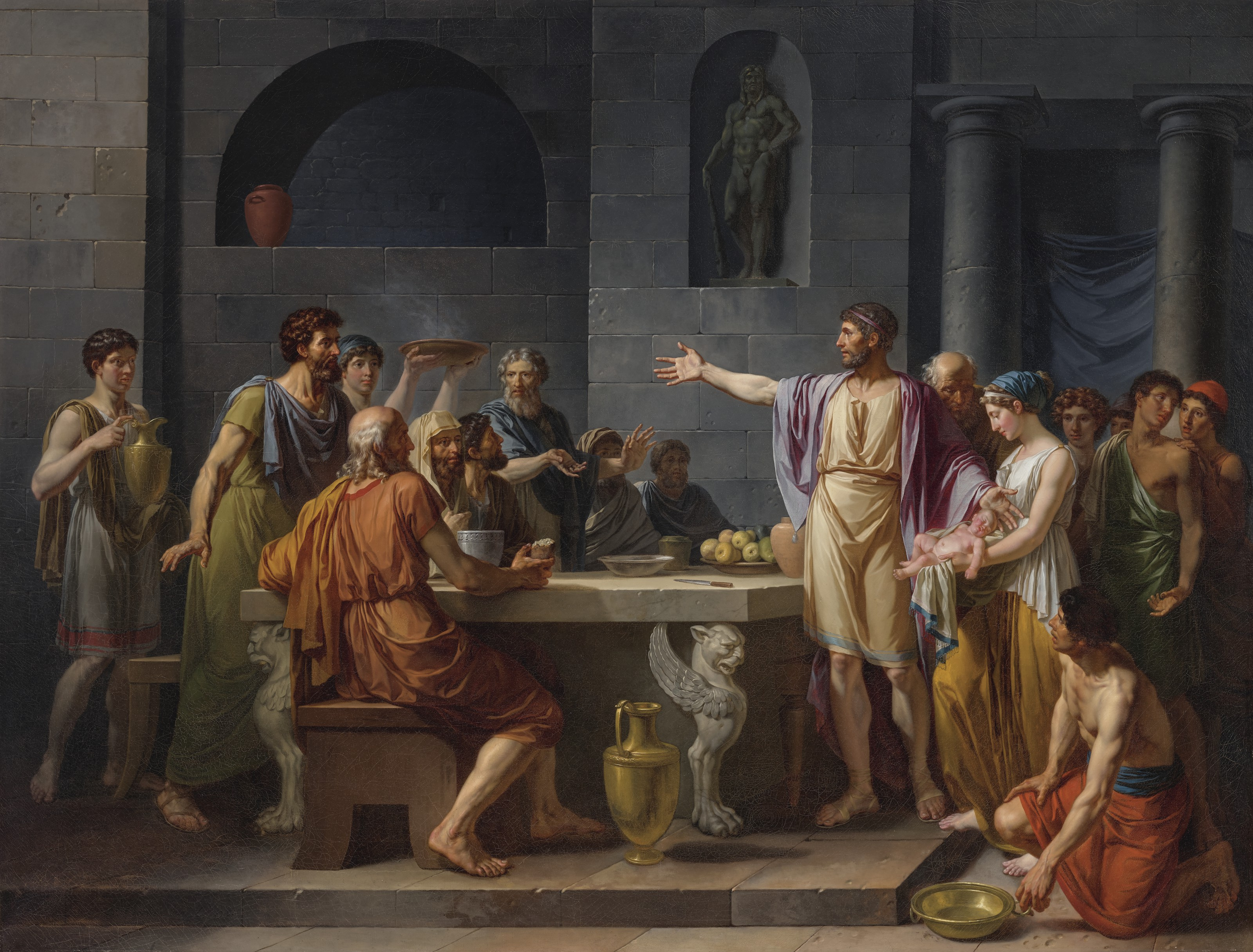
In the 1791 painting Lycurgus of Sparta by Jean-Jacques-François Le Barbier, Lycurgus hands over the kingship to a newly born child.

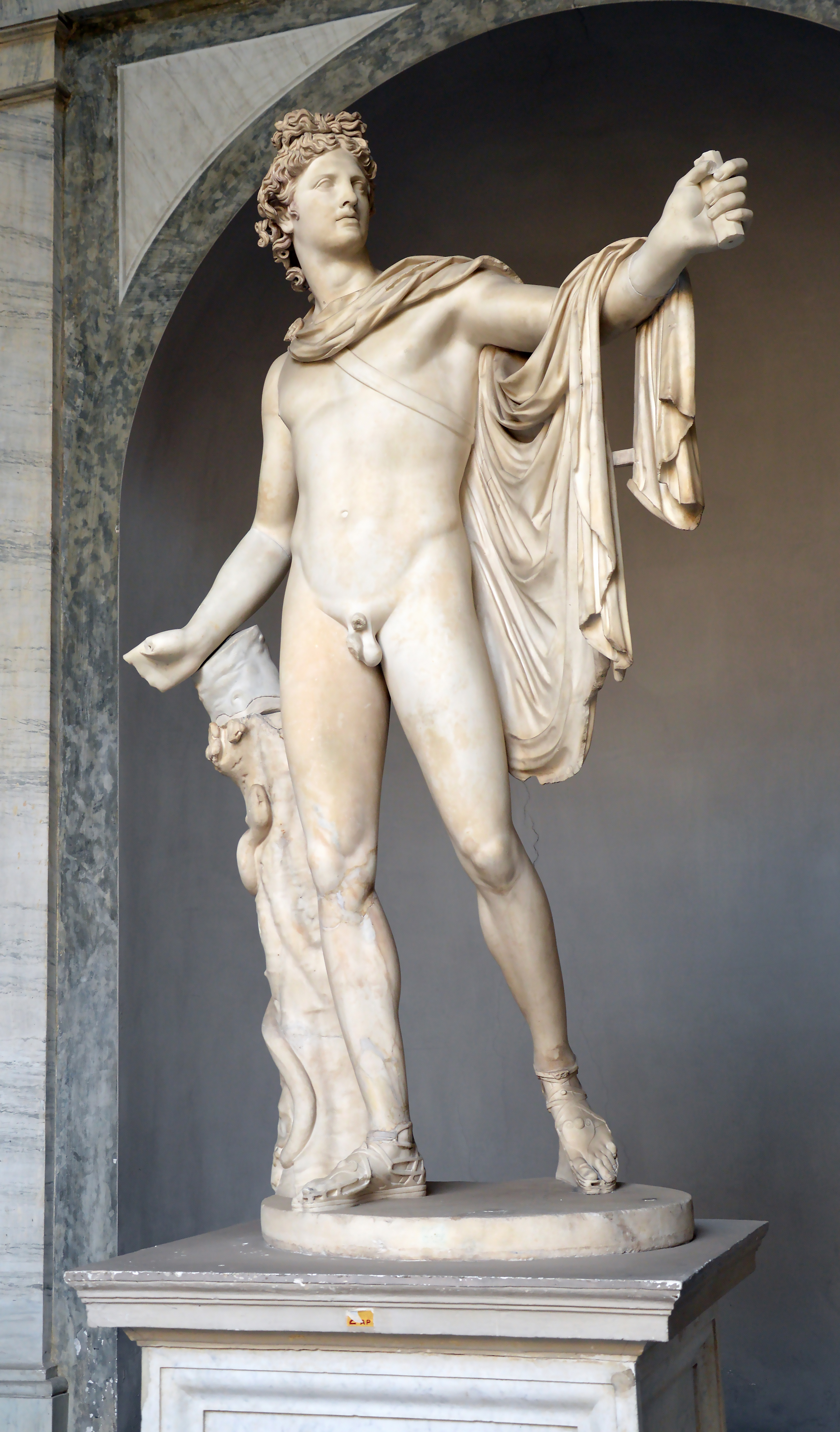
The god Apollo, depicted in this 2nd century statue, is supposed to have divinely sanctioned Lycurgus' laws through the Pythia, his oracle at Delphi.

In the earlier legends of Lycurgus, namely in the accounts of the Great Rhetra, Lycurgus is not credited with a radical reorganisation of Spartan life or with the institution of the ephorate. These early oral traditions – contra the written accounts – are "far from uniform". The earliest surviving written account on Lycurgus is in Herodotus, placing him as the guardian and regent of the early Argiad king Leobotes. Later accounts of Lycurgus' activities associate him with the later-more-influential Eurypontid dynasty instead, specifically as regent of Charilaus; the disputes indicate that the two royal houses by the historical period attempted to associate themselves by blood with the figure.

Herodotus provides two accounts for how the laws which Lycurgus enacted came to him: in the first version, Lycurgus receives those laws from Apollo through the Pythia at Delphi; in the second, based on Sparta's own traditions, Lycurgus bases the reforms on existing laws in Crete. Spartan and Cretan institutions did indeed have common characteristics, but, though some direct borrowing may have occurred, such similarities are in general more likely to be because of the common Dorian inheritance of Sparta and Crete rather than because some individual such as Lycurgus imported Cretan customs to Sparta. Some versions of the story say that Lycurgus subsequently traveled as far as Egypt, Spain, and India. In the narrative of Lycurgus' reforms in Herodotus, Lycurgus is supposed to have created much of the Spartan constitution, including the gerousia and the ephorate (respectively, the Spartan council of elders and annually-elected overseeing magistrates). He also is supposed to have reorganised Spartan military life and instituted the syssitia (the mess halls to which each Spartan belonged). In Xenophon's telling, the legend of Lycurgus expanded even further, ascribing to him not only reforms but also the creation of the Lacedaemonian dual monarchy and state as well.

The description of Lycurgus as a regent or guardian who establishes the laws characterises him as a selfless figure who places the good of his king and community before his own. To that end there are two main traditions relating to his regency. The first, in Herodotus, is that he undertakes the regency until his ward came of age. The second is that he resigns, to protect his ward, amid rumours that he wishes to supplant the ward as king. Plutarch's version of the story includes the ward's mother seeking Lycurgus' hand in marriage to facilitate his accession. In this version, Lycurgus leaves to prevent himself from being used as a pawn in politics against his nephew.

The tradition where Lycurgus continues in the regency has little difficulty in placing him in a position to promulgate his laws. But the latter tradition where he leaves the city requires him to be recalled. In Aristotle's version, recounted by Plutarch, Lycurgus leads his followers into the city and occupies the agora to impose his laws; backed by Apolline divine approval, he forces the tyrannical Charilaus to accede to them and institutes the gerousia. Xenophon instead has Lycurgus forging an alliance with the most powerful non-royal citizens and forcing the laws through. Plutarch's narrative presented in his own voice instead consolidates prior disparate stories into a general upsurge of support from the kings, the people, and the aristocracy.

In Plutarch's narrative, Lycurgus' laws cause backlash among the wealthy, who attempt to have him stoned. After he flees to the temple of Athena Chalcioecus and has one of his eyes put out by an adolescent, his opponents back down and he forgives the adolescent. The extent to which this story of revolution and conflict with the wealthy is driven by – or a retrojection from – the experiences of the reformist Spartan kings Agis IV and Cleomenes III is unclear; the two later Spartan kings used the Lycurgan legend to justify their redistributive policies (and violent means) as a return to Lycurgus' "true" Spartan traditions, deviations from which explained all problems of latter-day Sparta. Finally, in Plutarch's version, after Lycurgus' recall to Sparta to institute new laws, he has the community swear not to change the laws until he returns from Delphi. Upon reaching Delphi he dies so to enshrine the laws forever.

== Attributed reforms ==
Lycurgus' laws are supposed to have touched the whole of Spartan society. At various times, the Spartans attributed every one of their institutions to him, except the institution of the dual monarchy. Because the Spartans attributed all manner of laws and customs to him, it is impossible to determine which laws (if any) are his in actuality. However, it is clear today, from comparisons with other archaic Greek states, that Spartan institutions such as men's dining halls, organisation of age cohorts, and the use of iron money were not entirely out of the norm and had previously existed in other Greek cities: what made them distinctive was for how long they had been preserved at Sparta.

The character of many of the economic and social reforms attributed to Lycurgus was allegedly to ensure that citizens competed with each other only in merit rather than in wealth. However, many of the social reforms which are attributed to Lycurgus postdate him by centuries, occurring between 600–500 BC after various Spartan conquest of Messenia and Cynuria made landholdings available for the Spartan citizens. The economic reforms, which are supposed to have made Spartan citizens equal, never happened and were invented to legitimise redistributive policies in the Hellenistic period.

=== Political and military ===
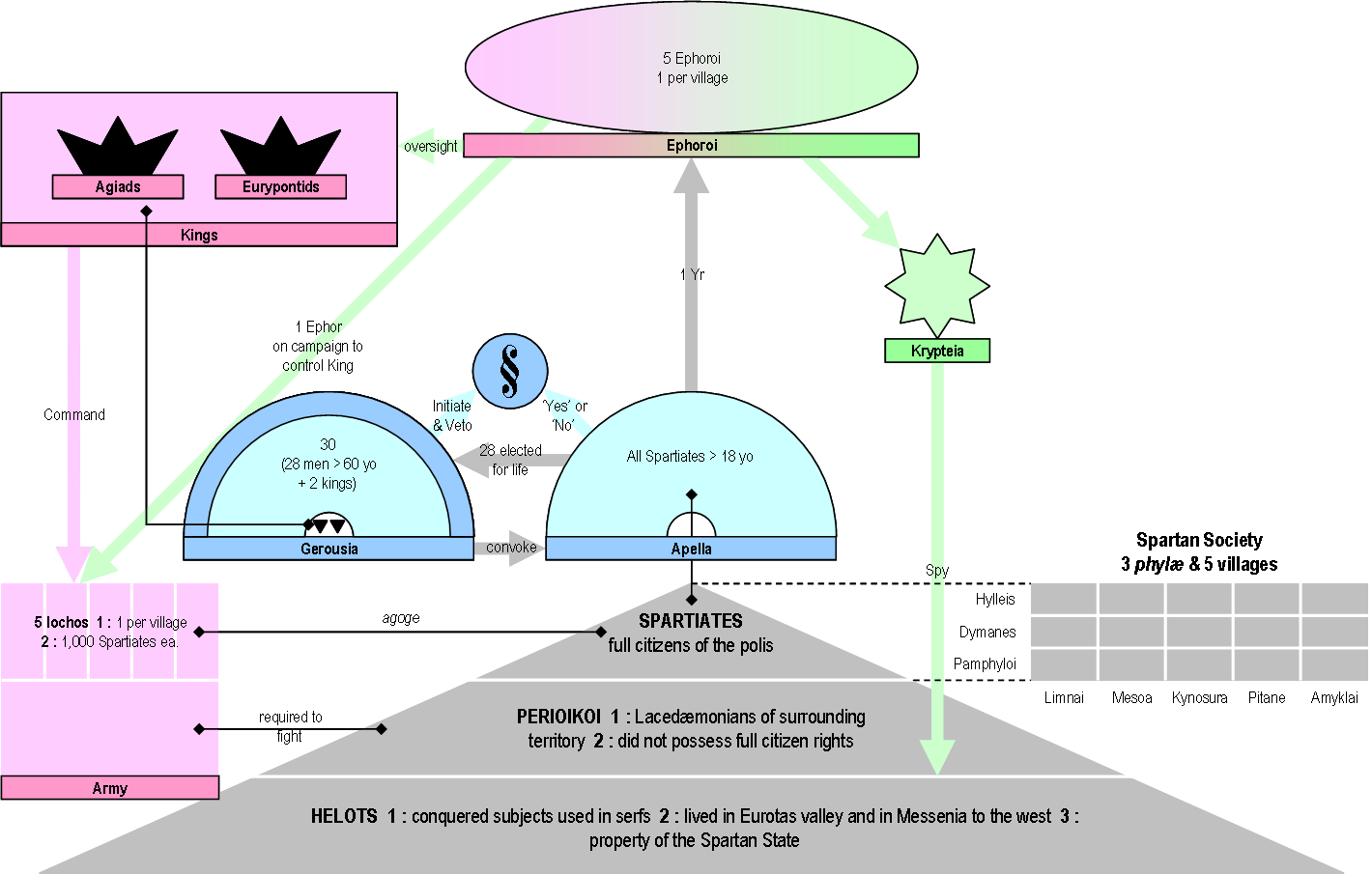
At various times, ancient writers attributed almost all parts of the Spartan constitution – diagrammed above – to Lycurgus' reforms. This unitary reformist moment is not accepted by modern scholars.

Lycurgus' political reforms were supposedly promulgated in a Great Rhetra that he received from the Pythia. It, however, is not genuine and contains anachronistic contents. Regardless, Plutarch records it as having included provisions related to Sparta's religious and political practices:

After dedicating a temple to Zeus.. and Athena..., forming phylai and creating obai, and instituting a gerousia of thirty including the kings, then hold an apella from time to time. Thus bring in and set aside [proposals]. The people are to have the right to respond, and power ... but if the people speak crookedly, the elders and kings are to be setters-aside.

Plutarch states that the provision that the elders and kings could set aside decisions of the apella, called the "rider", was a later addition. However, the grammatical construction of preserved rhetra is consistent with it being part of the original text, a view taken by Massimo Nafissi in Companion to archaic Greece, believing that the idea that the set-aside provision was later inserted was itself a fabrication of the fourth century BC.

Lycurgus is supposed also to have established the Spartan mess halls called syssitia or phiditia. Such halls were public, where all citizen men were required to eat dinner. Citizens were required to contribute to the mess hall's pantries with a substantial amount of food, wine, and money; failure or inability to do so would entail loss of citizenship. A relatively old tradition, predating the Hellenistic Spartan reformers Agis IV and Cleomenes III as well as likely Herodotus, claimed that Lycurgus' imposition of the mess halls created a citizen body of some 9,000 men. Each of these mess halls also played a role in military organisation: each likely had 15 men with three mess halls forming a "sworn band"; but after the perioikoi were merged into the Spartan army, each mess hall likely formed its own band. Such messes were likely preceded in the seventh century BC poet Alcman's time with andreia (private men's eating clubs). They became the classical syssitia after sumptuary restrictions, compulsory contributions from poorer citizens who previously abstained, and intermixture of rich and poor shortly before 500 BC.

The silence of the rhetra, a text meant to describe and legitimise the Spartan political system of the seventh century, with regard to Sparta's ephors suggests that the ephorate was a product of a later reform at Sparta and was not Lycurgan – pace Herodotus and Plutarch – in origin. In fact, archaeological discoveries at Sparta – showing the decline of Spartan art expressed on vases as well as a sudden expansion of agricultural labour in the mid-sixth century BC – suggest that much of the communitarian reforms attributed to Lycurgus may date to that time.

=== Economic ===
One of the illusions of the Spartan mirage was the illusion that Spartan citizens were economically equal: that no citizen owned more land than another. There is, however, no evidence of equal land ownership at Sparta, with exception of Cleomenes' five-year regime.

Land inequality increased through Spartan history, mediated by conquests abroad which allowed poorer citizens to retain a reasonable standard of living. When conquests ended after 550 BC, the poorer citizens were, over time, removed from the citizen rolls for inability to pay dues to the syssitia. Demands for redistribution, heard by the reformist Spartan monarchs Agis IV and Cleomenes III, led to the creation of a myth that Lycurgus redistributed the land of Laconia and Messenia equally among the homoioi with the helots as bound tenants. The consensus among scholars is that this never happened. The seventh century Spartan poet, Tyrtaeus, already opposed land distribution in the poem Eunomia, attesting to land inequality at the earliest times.

Lycurgus is also supposed to have ensured the austere lifestyle of the Spartans by banning the use of gold and silver coins, requiring a currency made of iron. Xenophon claimed that this meant acquisition of wealth became too bulky to hide; Plutarch believed that this was to make it impossible, or at least difficult, for Spartans to purchase luxury goods. Coinage came to Greece in the 550s BC; it is not possible that any law mentioning coins dates to the eighth century BC (or earlier), when Lycurgus is supposed to have lived. Nor is any ban on gold and silver mentioned in Herodotus. Usage of gold and silver at Sparta is implied by other reports that the kings were fined in drachma and talents as well as by Spartan state rewards and ransoms. Plutarch's attempted to reconcile the evidence by depicting the Spartans allowing gold and silver for public use but retaining the allegedly Lycurgan restrictions on private use. Such a depiction, however, is not consistent with actions by Spartan generals during the Peloponnesian War. Other ancient authors were more equivocal, dating the alleged ban on precious metals to after Lycurgus and to different men.

Ancient authors claimed of the Spartans a general aversion to commerce, which was also attributed to Lycurgus, who was supposed to have "forbade free men to touch anything to do with making money". This likely emerged from the fact that Spartan citizens, the spartiates or homoioi, were a leisurely class of land owners who looked down on manual labourers and craftsmen. Such a ban also likely emerged in the sixth century, since Spartan citizen sculptors are attested to prior to that time. The inequality of Spartan society also implies that trade must have occurred; the second dinner in the syssitia involved bread, meat, fish, and other produce which were bought or donated by wealthy Spartans. Plutarch, who claims Spartan did not dispute or talk about money, is also internally inconsistent when elsewhere notes Spartan commercial contracts and Sparta's delegation of such matters to expert resolution.

Plutarch also claims that Lycurgus imposed sumptuary legislation, prohibiting foreign artisans from residing at Sparta and restricting the tools with which Spartan houses could be built, to encourage simplicity. Archaeological evidence of foreign wares postdates the eighth century, with a decline in imports met by local production by the sixth century. The alleged simplicity of Spartan dwellings evidently did not extend to their interiors; and Spartans were famous across Greece for the jewellery worn by Spartan women, their number of slaves and horses, and their dominance at the expensive sport of chariot racing at pan-Hellenic games. While most male Spartan citizens affected a generally consistent and relatively inexpensive form of dress at home, Spartans on campaign showed extreme wealth from the expense of their crimson dyes to the polish of their armour. However, while Xenophon claims this austere dress also came from Lycurgus, art from Laconia implies adoption after 500 BC, consistent with Thucydides's claim that Spartans wore complex and luxurious clothing until "not long ago".

=== Social ===
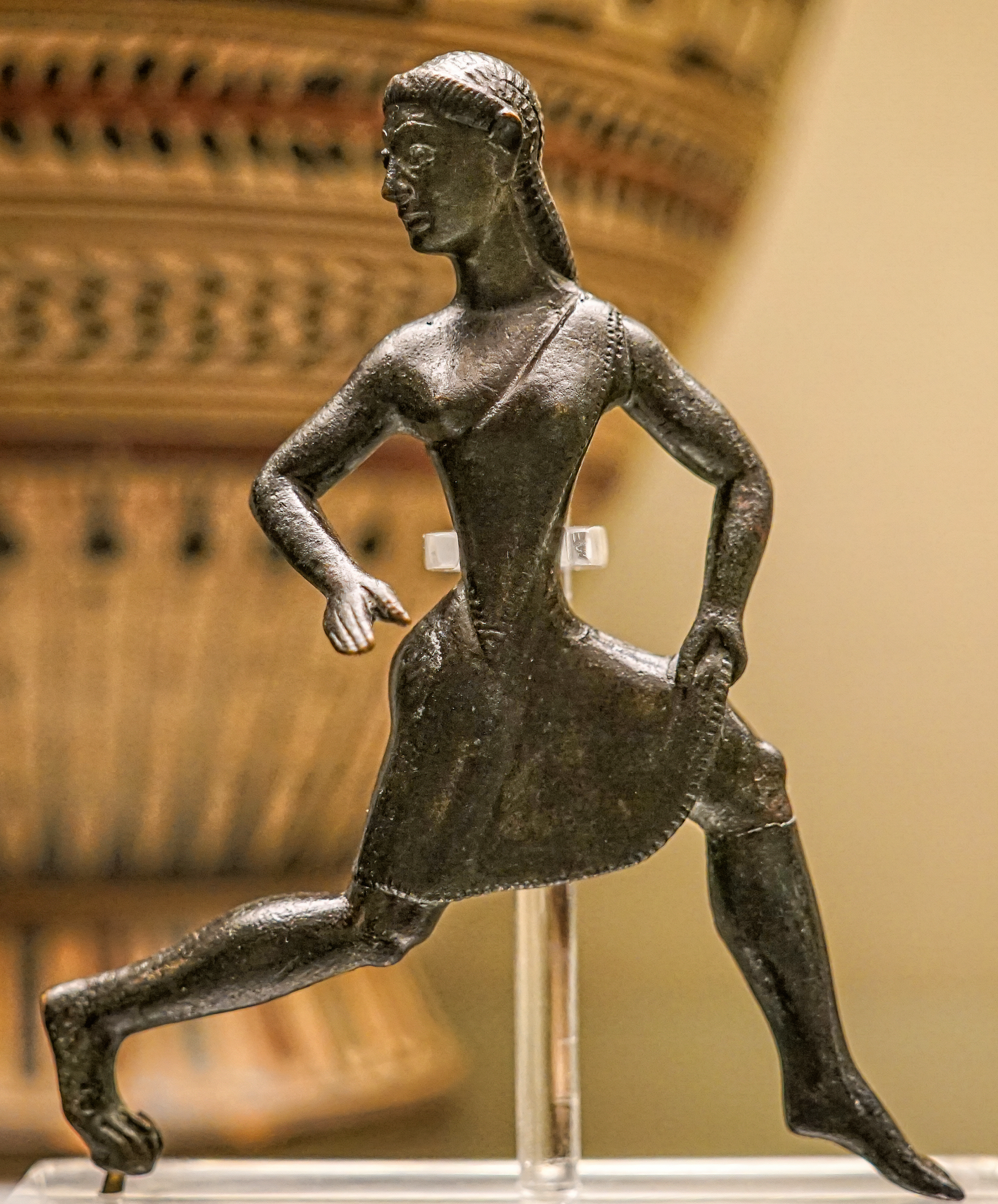
This archaic bronze statuette in the British Museum depicts a Laconian girl running or dancing in a chiton.

Lycurgus is also supposed to have instituted the Spartan practice of staged bride capture where the bride, rather than being processed to the groom's home for a wedding ceremony with feast, was instead ritually seized by the groom, and the marriage consummated without feast. The seventh century Spartan poet Alcman makes no mention of such customs, and composed wedding hymns reflecting the more common Greek wedding processions; Spartan wedding customs therefore also postdate Lycurgus, emerging some time before 500 BC. The further claim in Plutarch's Moralia that Lycurgus prohibited dowries altogether has no basis. Lycurgus is also said to have instituted a system of wife sharing as a pronatalist and eugenicist policy; if such wife sharing existed, it is likely a product of Spartan population decline in the fifth century BC.

Plutarch also credits Lycurgus with sumptuary laws on burials. Archaeological evidence broadly supports the notion that Spartans practiced uniform burial without grave goods, albeit with exceptions for generals and Olympic victors. However, Lycurgus is also said to have banned lamentations and allowed burials near temples. Burials near temples were common in archaic Greece before being prohibited by most cities; Sparta merely retained the practice. The earliest Spartan art and poems also still mention lamenting mourners, implying that such a ban likely postdates Lycurgus and was introduced c. 600 BC; moreover, any ban on grave goods must postdate a grave, also c. 600 BC, containing pottery grave goods. Further claims that Lycurgus required the burial of fallen Spartan soldiers abroad are not compatible with archaeological evidence showing that the first certain mass grave for Spartan battlefield losses was at Plataea.

The education of Spartan boys in the agoge, less anachronistically the paideia, was also attributed to an initiative of Lycurgus to equalise Spartan citizens socially, by raising them without outside family and clan loyalties. Though the story is rejected by Plutarch, Lycurgus is also said to have instituted the crypteia, a group of young men tasked with clandestinely killing helots in the night. Both the agoge and crypteia likely emerged some time during the seventh century alongside the institution of the ephorate. The education of Spartan women, mainly focusing on physical fitness, or, supposedly, physical fitness to produce healthy children for eugenic purposes, was similarly attributed to Lycurgus.

== Legacy ==
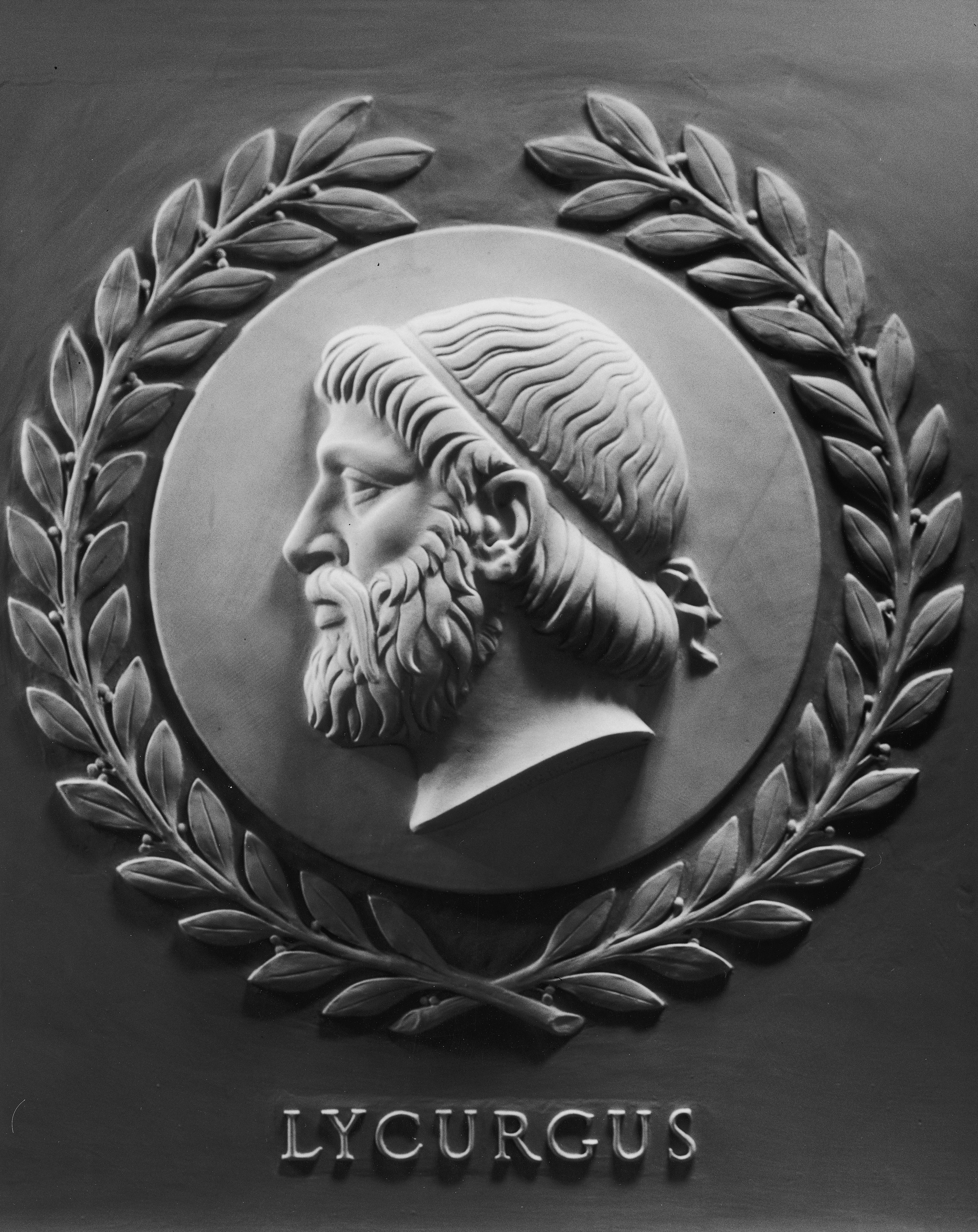
Lycurgus depicted in a 1950 bas relief, as one of the 23 great historical lawgivers in the United States Capitol.

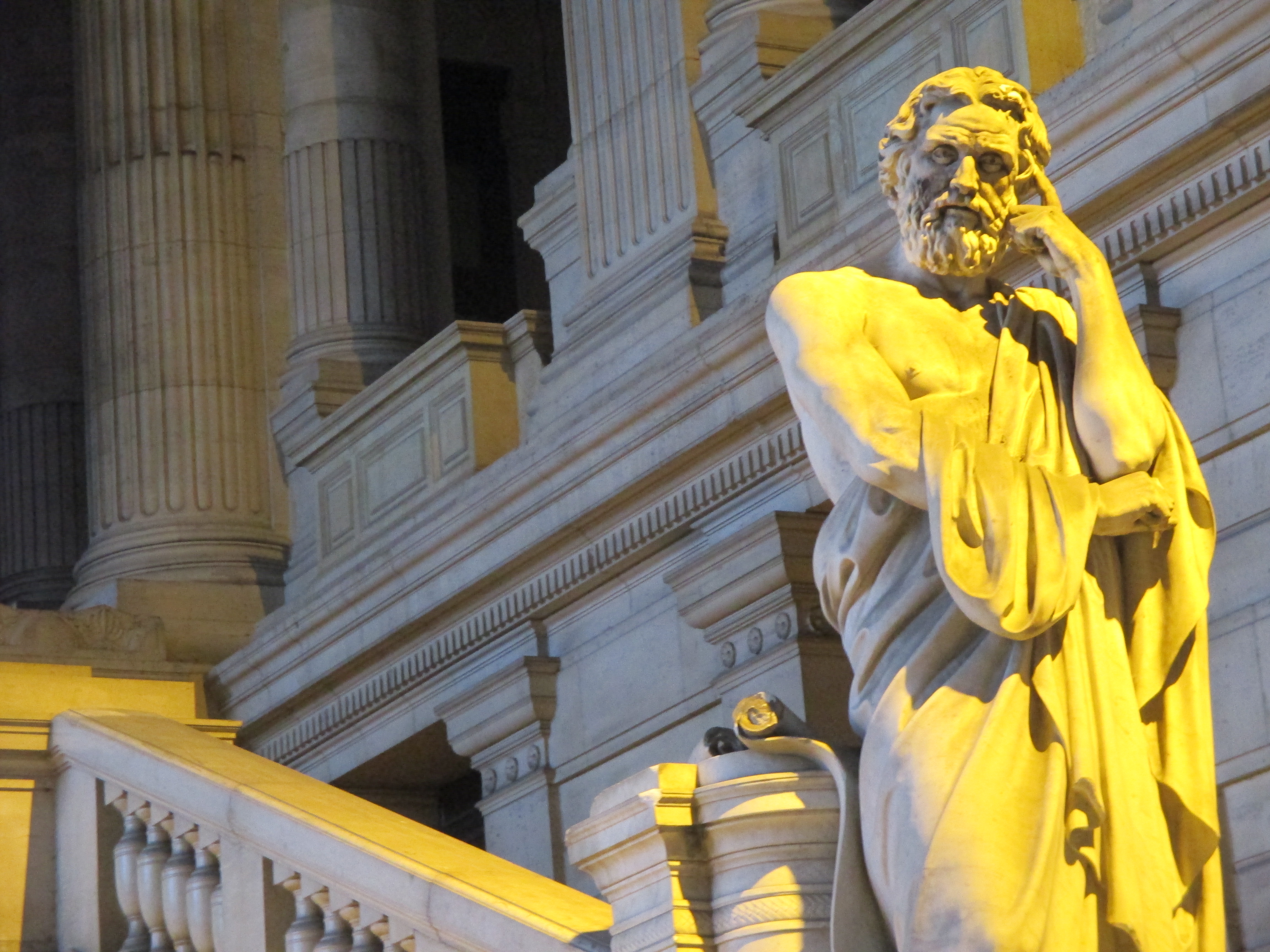
Statue of Lycurgus at the nineteenth century Law Courts in Brussels, Belgium.

=== Ancient ===
In Spartan society, Lycurgus and his laws were received as the creator of the Spartan way of life. Xenophon's pro-Spartan Spartan Constitution "unreservedly regard[s Lycurgus] as the Spartan legislator par excellence, who arranged the Spartan way of life once and for all". For these achievements, which they viewed as having facilitated the emergence of Sparta as the most powerful state in Greece, Lycurgus was honoured with a hero cult, which may have developed slowly into the Roman imperial period into full godhood. His temple and sanctuary, according to Pausanias, included a grave for his son with the name Eukosmos (referring to good order) with the graves of the Spartan dual monarchy's founders' wives nearby.

The idealisation of Sparta, called the "Spartan mirage", also drove praise of Lycurgus in other Greek states. The tradition of a timeless legislator with his divinely-inspired (or at least sanctioned) laws gave Sparta's constitution greater legitimacy while also making it inflexible. Even attempts to reform Spartan life during the Hellenistic period, by Spartan monarchs Agis IV and Cleomenes III, were viewed in their time as returning to Lycurgan tradition rather than an innovation. The stories of Lycurgus were constantly reinvented for each Spartan generation; the decline of Sparta through to Hellenistic times saw Lycurgus' praise extended to praise him for having creating an ideal Sparta, free from the moral and political decay of the real one.

Admiration of the customs of Sparta, supposed to be established by Lycurgus, survived – with a break during the second century when Sparta was part of the Achaean League – continuously into the Sparta of the Roman Empire. Aristotle, for example, praised the Lycurgan agoge as a form of universal education especially in the way it supported the stability of the Spartan state. Into the Roman period, Sparta received privileged treatment from the Romans as in part a means to preserve Greek traditions to display to tourists: while this touristic Sparta at times veered toward the extreme, it also cultivated its Lycurgan inheritance by means of architecture, theatre, and retention of distinctive political institutions.

The Plutarchian comparison between the paired lives of Lycurgus and Numa (the early Roman lawgiver and king), for example, judged Lycurgus favourably compared to the Roman by emphasising Lycurgan education and pronatalism. Another argument for Lycurgan superiority was also that Sparta declined as it supposedly deviated from Lycurgus' settlements while Rome flourished as it similarly deviated from Numa's ideals. In the end, for Plutarch, Lycurgus was seen as a more important political theorist than Plato and as one of the most famous, moral, and effective legislators of the Greek tradition.

=== Modern ===
The main elements of Lycurgus' legacy are through the laws attributed to him. In the modern world this took on a number of aspects: the stability of the Lacedaemonian state from Lycurgus' balanced constitution; universal male citizen conscription and contribution (via the syssitia); economic freedom for citizens by their possession of sufficient land and helots to meet their needs; and austere politics for the common good. The republican views of Niccolò Machiavelli trended toward the Lycurgan "mixed constitution" but this was not necessarily a through-line in Renaissance European political thought. Other thinkers of the period hailed Lycurgan politics as building a stable polity dedicated to simplicity, unity, and the communal interest – attributing to the Spartans, not necessarily rightly, universal education and equality among citizens – while also noting the cruelty of the agoge and denigration of autonomy, especially in contrast to democratic Athens.

Charles Rollin, a French educator, produced an enduring and admiring conception of Lycurgus as having created the rule of law, the mixed constitution, equality, and universal education. The philosopher Jean-Jacques Rousseau, who derived most of his knowledge of Lycurgus from Plutarch's biography, viewed the figure positively as standing for an austere civil morality acting for the collective good. This view of Lycurgus and Sparta saw him associate Lycurgus' reforms with the "general will". Positive views of Sparta pervaded some articles in the Encyclopédie but this was not shared by all authors. Diderot, the main editor of the Encyclopédie, was more pessimistic, saying that Lycurgan laws "created monks bearing arms" while branding the system as a whole "an atrocity" and "incompatible with a large... [or] commercial state". The branding of Lycurguan Sparta as a "dismal monastery" was widely, but not universally, shared among the philosophes. Similar negative views were expressed by the American founder John Adams who saw Lycurgus as having doomed his own people to poverty and futile militarism; however, he also praised the Lycurgan – as well as the Polybian – mixed constitution in Defense of the Constitutions as did James Madison in the Federalist Papers (number 63).

Nationalist views of Spartan society, which praised Spartan eugenicism and militarism became common in Germany in the later nineteenth century through to the Nazi regime. Such views, however, were not unanimous. The German classicist Karl Julius Beloch, for example, was one of the first to take a highly critical view of Sparta, suggesting that Lycurgus was a fiction and his Great Rhetra a fabrication. In the aftermath of the First World War, German nationalism embraced Sparta and Lycurgus, seeing it as a locus of heroism, physicality, racial purity, and struggle. Such themes complemented fascist and Nazi ideology, painting Sparta as a "proto-National Socialist state". Defeat in the Second World War largely ended such hagiography.

== See also ==
- Draco, an Athenian lawgiver
- Solon, an Athenian lawgiver
