= Gerousia =

Senate of ancient Sparta

The Gerousia (Γερουσία; also called the Spartan Senate) was the council of elders in the ancient Greek city-state of Sparta. It was a prestigious body, holding important judicial, legislative, and supervisory powers. During the Archaic and Classical periods, the Gerousia consisted of the two Spartan kings, plus twenty-eight adult male citizens (Spartiates) called gerontes (γέροντες, singular: γέρων, gerōn). The gerontes were required to be at least sixty-years old, were elected by acclamation, and held office for life. Following the Classical period, its membership, minimum age, and tenure were all reduced.

== Power and importance ==
At Sparta, political power was divided between three deliberative bodies, the Gerousia, the Ephorate, and the Assembly. Although the relative power and importance of the Gerousia with respect to these other two bodies are a matter of scholarly debate, the Gerousia was, apparently, the most prestigious. Since membership in the Gerousia was for life, being a geron was particularly prestigious within a Spartan society that accorded great respect to old age, and within the Gerousia, the votes of the "ordinary" geron carried as much weight as that of each of the kings.

A newly elected geron received considerable institutionalized honors. According to Plutarch, a new geron crowned himself with a victory wreath, and visited each of the city's temples and shrines, leading a large procession of young men and women singing his praise. After which he was feted at a series of private banquets. At the following common mess, he received two portions of food, one of which he set aside, whereupon at the end of the meal, his female relatives would gather at the mess hall doorway, and he would give his second portion to the one he most esteemed, who would then be lauded and escorted home by the others.

The Gerousia performed important judicial, legislative, and supervisory functions.

=== Judicial ===
The Gerousia was the highest court of law in Sparta, serving as the court in charge of capital cases. Both Xenophon and Aristotle report on the kinds of cases the Gerousia had jurisdiction over. According to Xenophon, the Gerousia was in charge of offenses subject to the death penalty (τοὺς γέροντας κυρίους τοῦ περὶ τῆς ψυχῆς ἀγῶνος). According to Aristotle, the Gerousia presided over cases of homicide (while the Ephorate took cases of breach of contract, and other magistrates handled other kinds of cases), and in another passage (presumably referring to the Gerousia) he writes that a "few persons have the power to sentence to death and exile, and a number of other such matters". As Plutarch describes it, the gerontes were "lord[s] ... of life and death, honour and dishonour, and all the greatest issues of life."

Even the Spartan kings could be subject to the criminal jurisdiction of the Gerousia (sometimes at least in conjunction with the five ephors). According to the second-century AD travel writer Pausanias, the court (δικαστήριον) responsible for the trial of a Spartan king consisted of the twenty-eight gerontes, the ephors, and the other king; in the trial of king Pausanias, in 403 BC, fourteen gerontes and king Agis II voted guilty, and rest of the gerontes and ephors voted for acquittal. Although this is the only trial of a king for which the Gerousia is explicitly mentioned as having been involved, Pausanias' description of the makeup of such a tribunal is generally accepted as having been the established practice. The Gerousia's judicial authority could entail political power as well, as the threat of prosecution could exert considerable influence over the conduct of Spartan foreign policy.

=== Legislative ===
The Gerousia helped shape state policy through its powers of probouleusis and nomophulakia. Probouleusis (preliminary deliberation) was a common feature of most Ancient Greek decision-making procedures, whereby a select council or group of officials drafted motions and submitted them to a popular assembly for ratification. According to Plutarch, the source of the Gerousia's power was its probouleutic privilege of submitting measures (probouleumata) to be presented to the Assembly. The procedure (at least at the time of the reign of Agis IV) seems to have been that, in order for a bill to become law, it had first to be introduced by an ephor into the Gerousia for discussion and approval before it was then submitted to a vote in the Assembly.

The Gerousia also held the power of nomophulakia (guardianship of the law) designed to protect Spartan nomos (practice, custom, and law), a power meant to insure both the legality of the enactments passed by the Assembly, as well as their conformity with traditional Spartan norms. An explicit example of this power of nomophulakia is perhaps found in the Great Rhetra, according to the usual interpretation of which, the Gerousia not only could submit proposals to the Assembly, but could also veto any action of the Assembly. There is, however, no unequivocal evidence that this veto power was ever employed.

== Membership ==
The Archaic and Classical Gerousia consisted of thirty members, twenty-eight elected members (called gerontes) and the two kings, who were members by right of birth, entering the chamber upon their accession provided they were of age. Unlike the kings, the gerontes had to be at least sixty years old—the age when Spartan citizens were no longer required to serve in the army. The gerontes were elected by acclamation and held office for life.

The electoral procedure is known thanks to the biographer Plutarch, who wrote c. 100 AD, but whose source was probably the lost Aristotelian Constitution of the Lakedaimonians (Lakedaimoniōn Politeia). There were no ballots: the Spartan Assembly elected the gerontes by acclamation, their usual voting method. The candidates passed one by one before the Assembly, who then shouted according to their preference. The loudness of the shouts was assessed by a jury confined into a windowless building, who then declared the winner to be the candidate receiving what they judged to be the loudest shouts. Aristotle called the election procedure for the Gerousia "childish" (παιδαριώδης), probably referring to the method of voting by shouting (boa) described by Plutarch. Aristotle further described the selection of the Gerousia as being dunasteutike ('dynastic'), the feminine adjectival form of dunasteia, which, for Aristotle, meant a small and lawless oligarchy.

According to Aristotle, the Gerousia was the element of Sparta's mixed constitution which represented the kaloi kāgathoi (the 'fine and noble'). The gerontes were likely drawn from a limited aristocracy composed of only a few families. While there is no explicit proof of any legal restriction on eligibility, it is generally assumed that these families enjoyed a de facto monopoly. G. E. M. de Ste. Croix compared the situation in Sparta with that of the Roman Republic, where a few gentes monopolised senior magistracies, notably thanks to their patronage network—a practice likely prevalent in Spartan politics.

Although, as noted above, each of the members of the Gerousia had an equal vote, the two kings, who were members ex officio, could acquire power exceeding that of the ordinary geron. The kings usually entered the chamber well before the age of sixty and thus served much longer terms than the other gerontes, enabling them to exert considerable influence over the rest of the Gerousia, and thus over Spartan policy. The kings' enormous wealth could also be used to exert influence. According to Plutarch, Agesilaus II sent an ox and a cloak to each newly elected geron. The kings also enjoyed the prerogative of voting by proxy. According to Herodotus, whenever one of the kings could not attend a meeting of the Gerousia, for example when on campaign outside Laconia, his closest relative on the Gerousia could vote on his behalf. This would seem to assume that a king would always have a relative on the Gerousia, a further indication of the Gerousia's aristocratic nature.

Following his abolishment of the Ephorate, in 227 BC, king Cleomenes III also, among other reforms, (probably) made the election to the Gerousia annual, reducing the term of office of a geron to one year. No longer elected for life, a major source of the gerontes' prestige was removed. At some point, during or before the reign of Augustus (27 BC – AD 14), the number of members had been reduced to twenty-three. In addition, the minimum age requirement had probably also been significantly reduced.

== History ==
Sparta lacked the "epigraphic habit" of Classical Athens, and the historical mentions of the Gerousia, or the gerontes, are sparse. The earliest such mention is the Great Rhetra (c. 700 BC?), a document quoted by the first-century historian and biographer Plutarch, who probably based his text and commentary on the lost Aristotelian Constitution of the Lakedaimonians dated to the second half of the fourth century BC.

Scholars assume that the Gerousia probably descended from a group of advisors to the kings, such as the noble councilors portrayed in Homeric epic. When exactly the Gerousia became formally institutionalized is unknown; however, its mention in the Rhetra and the specification of thirty members indicate that the Gerousia was already fully institutionalized by at least the early Archaic period. The ancient Spartans considered the Gerousia to have been created by the legendary Spartan lawgiver Lycurgus.

=== Archaic period ===
Plutarch presents the Great Rhetra as an oracle brought back from Delphi by Lycurgus, which he then used in the establishment of Sparta's form of government. According to Plutarch, of the "many innovations" made by Lycurgus, "the first and most important" was the Gerousia, which according to Plato, tempered the "feverish" [phlegmainō] government of kings, with the moderating influence of old age [gēras]. As quoted by Plutarch, the Rhetra fixed the composition of Gerousia at thirty members including the two "archagetai" (kings). It also specified that the Gerousia shall: "bring in" (eispherein) and "set aside" (aphisthasthai) proposals, and that, "if the people asks for something crooked", the members of the Gerousia "are to be setters aside" (apostateras hēmen).

The fifth-century BC historian Herodotus mentions only one action taken by the Gerousia, which occurred sometime in the mid-sixth century BC. The Gerousia, together with the ephors, involved in a dispute with king Anaxandridas II's regarding his lack of a royal heir, threaten to take the dispute before the Assembly, which was enough to persuade the king to accede to their request to take a second wife.

=== Classical period ===
There is little evidence, in the historical record, of the involvement of the Gerousia in political decision-making during the classical period. In Thucydides' (c. 460 – c. 400 BC), History of the Peloponnesian War, which covers the war between Sparta and Athens from 431 to 411 BC), the Gerousia is neither mentioned nor alluded to. This includes his account of the Spartan decision go to war with Athens in 432 BC, which seems to leave no room for any action by the Gerousia.

The historian Diodorus Siculus (fl. 1st century BC) reports that at meetings of both the Gerousia and the Assembly (c. 478–474 BC), the question of whether to make war on Athens for control of the sea was considered. All seemed eager to do so, until the geron Hetoemaridas, "who was a direct descendant of Heracles and enjoyed favour among the citizens by reason of his character", persuaded the Gerousia and the Assembly against such a war. As mentioned above, the Gerousia was part of the tribunal which tried and acquitted king Pausanias upon his return from Athens, in 403 BC. In a 19-15 decision, fourteen gerontes, along with the other king Agis II, voted to convict, while the remaining fourteen gerontes along with the five ephors voted for acquittal. Xenophon (c. 430– 355/354 BC), in his Hellenica (a history of Greece covering the period 411–362 BC), mentions the gerontes in action only once. According to Xenophon, without consulting the Assembly, the ephors, and some gerontes, took emergency action to thwart the Conspiracy of Cinadon (c. 400 BC).

=== Hellenistic and Roman periods ===
Pausanias reports that the Gerousia decided in favor of Areus I as the successor of king Cleomenes II in 309/308 BC. The next mention of the Gerousia concerns king Agis IV's proposed reforms of 243 BC. According to Plutarch, because of a divided Gerousia, the ephor Lysander convened the Assembly, which apparently favored the king's reforms consisting of debt cancellations and land redistribution. However, after being lobbied by the "men of wealth", the Gerousia, in what Plutarch describes as exercising their probouletic power, rejected the proposed reforms by one vote. Although Plutarch's use of the expression "to probouleuein" is generally understood to mean that the Gerousia's rejection occurred during the predeliberation phase, and that the proposals were, therefore, never formally submitted to the Assembly for final approval, some scholars interpret this rejection, as having, in fact, been an exercise of the Gerousia's veto power, occurring after the proposals had been approved by the Assembly. Not long after, in 241 BC, the exiled king Leonidas II, returned to Sparta, installed his own group of ephors, and imprisoned Agis. According to Plutarch, after Leonidas' ephors summoned those gerontes, "who were of the same mind as themselves, as though the king were to have a trial", Agis was condemned to death and summarily executed.

According to Pausanias, in 227 BC, the Gerousia's power was significantly diminished as a result of the reforms of king Cleomenes III. Pausanias refers to Cleomenes, as [having] "destroyed" (katalūsās) the Gerousia's "power" (kratos), and establishing, "in its stead" (ant᾽ autōn), a new magistrate, the patronomos. Some scholars have apparently read Pausanias as meaning that, rather than simply weakening it, Cleomenes, in fact, "abolished" the Gerousia all together, and replaced it with a new council called the Patronomoi ("Council of Fathers" or "Council of Elders"). However, the Gerousia is again mentioned as having been involved in the exile of twenty-four leading Spartans that took place in 149 BC. According to Pausanias, a motion to exile the Spartans was introduced by the geron Agasisthenes and passed by the Gerousia.

Following the reforms of Cleomenes in 227 BC, although numerous inscriptions, from the reign of Augustus (27 BC – AD 14) onward, attest to the continued existence of the Gerousia during Sparta's Roman period, the Gerousia, and gerontes virtually disappear from the historical record. Changes to the Gerousia's composition and organization, during this period, resulted in a significant reduction of its authority and prestige. At some point, during or before the reign of Augustus (27 BC – AD 14), a geron's term of office was reduced, from life, to one year (although gerontes could be reelected), and the number of gerontes was reduced from twenty-eight to twenty-three. Cleomenes probably made the office annual as part of his reforms, and may also have reduced the number of members. However, neither of these changes is attested until the early Roman principate. There are many, often fragmentary, inscribed catalogues listing the names of the gerontes for a given year, of which five are complete and list twenty-three names. In addition, the minimum age requirement was probably also reduced during this period from sixty to perhaps forty. Its influence and powers of probouleusis and nomophulakia seem also to have been, if not wholly usurped, then at least diluted, by the emergence of other boards of magistrates.

=== Historical record ===
A record of explicit mentions of the Gerousia or gerontes in connection with specific historical contexts:

BC	Context
c 700?	The Great Rhetra documents the Gerousia's composition and powers.
540s	The Gerousia and the ephors threaten to convene the Assembly in order to force king Anaxandridas II to accede to their demands concerning marriage.
c. 475	The geron Hetoemaridas persuades the Gerousia and the Assembly not to go to war with Athens.
403	The Gerousia, the five ephors, and king Agis II form a tribunal that votes 19-15 to acquit king Pausanias, with the gerontes votes evenly split 14-14.
399? 397	Without consulting the Assembly, the ephors, and some gerontes, take emergency action, thwarting the Conspiracy of Cinadon.
367	The gerontes (along with Agesilaus II and the ephors) weep joyously at the victory of Archidamus over the Arcadians.
309/8	The Gerousia decides in favor of Areus I as the successor of king Cleomenes II.
c. 243	The Gerousia rejects, by one vote, the proposed reforms of king Agis IV involving debt cancellations and land redistribution.
241	Some gerontes along with the ephors and king Leonidas II participate in a trial of king Agis IV.
227	The Gerousia is significantly weakened by the reforms of King Cleomenes III.
149	The geron Agasisthenes puts forward a motion, passed by the Gerousia, to exile twenty four leading Spartans.
1st. c. ff.	Inscribed catalogs list the names of gerontes for a given year.

== Possible gerontes of pre-Roman Sparta ==
Very few names of gerontes have been preserved before the Roman conquest.

- Hetoemaridas, an Heraclid and influential geron who convinced the Spartans not to go to war against Athens in c. 475.
- Lichas son of Arcesilaus was perhaps a geron at the end of the 5th century BC. He was an Olympic victor (in the 4-horse chariot race) and played a significant role in shaping Spartan diplomacy with Persia in the final phase of the Peloponnesian War.
- Etymokles, a friend of king Agesilaus II; while a geron, he was also a member of an embassy to Athens when Sphodrias attempted to capture Piraeus in 378.
- Prothöos, perhaps a geron in 371, he argued for the recall of king Cleombrotus, who was leading an army against Thebes. His call was dismissed, and Sparta was defeated at the subsequent battle of Leuctra.
- Aineidas, a geron from the middle of the 4th century, known only from an inscription.
- Agasisthenes, a geron c.150, who made a motion in the Gerousia to send into exile 24 citizens to avoid war with the Achaean League.
