= Ephor =

Magistrates in ancient Sparta

The ephors were a board of five magistrates in ancient Sparta. They had an extensive range of judicial, religious, legislative, and military powers, and could shape Sparta's home and foreign affairs.

The word "ephors" (Ancient Greek ἔφοροι éphoroi, plural form of ἔφορος éphoros) comes from the Ancient Greek ἐπί epi, "on" or "over", and ὁράω horaō, "to see", i.e., "one who oversees" or "overseer". The ephors were a council of five Spartan men elected annually who swore an oath monthly on the behalf of the state. The Spartan kings, however, would swear on behalf of themselves.

The ephors did not have to kneel before the Kings of Sparta, and were held in high esteem by the citizens because of the importance of their powers and because of the holy role that they earned throughout their functions.

Several other Greek city-states with a Spartan ancestry also had ephors, such as Taras or Cyrene.

== History ==
=== Creation ===
Two different accounts of the origins of the ephorate exist in ancient sources. The earliest account is found in the Histories of Herodotus, who traces its origins to the mythical Spartan lawgiver Lycurgus—a version followed by Xenophon, Plato, or Isocrates. A diverging version first appears in the Politics, written in the middle of the 4th century BC by Aristotle, who tells that the ephorate was created by the Spartan king Theopompos. This version is then more prevalent in subsequent authors, such as Cicero, and especially Plutarch. Modern scholars have identified the source of the second version in a lost work written by the Agiad king Pausanias after he had been forced to abdicate and go into exile in 394 BC. In this logos, Pausanias likely published Lycurgus' laws, including the Rhetra, which details the different elements of the Spartan constitution (kings, gerousia, and Assembly), but does not mention the ephors. It has therefore been suggested that Pausanias was hostile to the ephors, to whom he possibly attributed his banishment, and published the Rhetra to discredit their office. Although the contents of this logos and Pausanias' motivations remain disputed, most modern scholars think the ephors were created at the time of Theopompos, during the Messenian Wars. However, Yurij Andreev points out that Ancient Thera also had ephors despite having been settled by the Dorians as early as the 9th century. He takes it to mean that both stated dates were invented for political reasons (with the ephors trying to connect themselves to Lycurgus, and the kings trying to claim they created the position and are thus above it), and in reality, the officials had already existed far earlier in some form. Solomon Luria had proposed in 1927 that the original function of the ephors was that of mystics and omen-watchers (as preserved in classical times in the form of sky watching), only later growing to include all the power of later times.

According to Plutarch, the ephorate was born out of the necessity for leaders while the kings of Sparta were absent for long periods during the Messenian Wars. The ephors were elected by the popular assembly, and all citizens were eligible. The position of ephor was the only political office open to the whole damos (populace) of men between the ages of 30 and 60, so eligible Spartans highly sought after the position. They were forbidden to be re-elected and provided a balance for the two kings, who rarely co-operated. Plato called the ephors tyrants, who ran Sparta as despots while the kings were little more than generals. Up to two ephors would accompany a king on extended military campaigns as a sign of control, and they held the authority to declare war during some periods in Spartan history.

Since political and economic decisions were made by majority vote, Sparta's policy could change quickly, when the vote of one ephor changed. For example, in 403 BC, Pausanias convinced three of the ephors to send an army to Attica, a complete reversal of the policy of Lysander. According to Aristotle, the ephors frequently came from poverty because any Spartan citizen could hold the position, and it was not exclusive to the upper-class. Aristotle stated that because of this they were often liable to corruption. There were times when the legal power of an ephor was taken advantage of, such as with Alcibiades's use of Endius, who persuaded the Spartans to allow Alcibiades to take control of Sparta's peace mission to Athens in 420 BC.

Cleomenes III abolished the position of ephor in 227 BC, and replaced them with a position called the patronomos. Cleomenes's coup resulted in the death of four of the five ephors, along with ten other citizens. His abolition of the ephorship allowed him to cement his role as king and prevent anyone from stopping his political reforms. However, the ephorate was restored by the Macedonian King Antigonus III Doson after the Battle of Sellasia in 222 BC. Although Sparta fell under Roman rule in 146 BC, the position existed into the 2nd century AD, when it was likely abolished by Roman Emperor Hadrian and superseded by imperial governance as part of the province of Achaea.

== Election ==
The ephorate elections took place close to the Autumn equinox, because the term of the ephors matched the Spartan year, which started with the first full moon after the equinox, therefore the end of September or October.

There was probably an age requirement of at least 30 years old to be elected ephor, the age from which a Spartan citizen was no longer considered eromenos.

The Spartan constitution is principally known through the work of Aristotle, who describes in detail the elections of the gerontes (the members of the Gerousia), but not the ephors. It is still assumed that the election procedure was similar. Candidates passed one by one before the assembled citizens, who shouted according to their preference, while several assessors who were confined into a windowless building declared winners the five candidates with the loudest shouts. As with the gerontes, this system of voice voting was considered "childish" by Aristotle, because influential men could easily manipulate the results by pressuring the jury.

The kings played a prominent role during election campaigns by favouring their candidates, even though only one instance of such practice is known, when in 243/242 Lysander was elected ephor with the help of the king Agis IV. The fact that influential kings such as Cleomenes I or Agesilaus II had no reported conflict with the ephors support the view that they could decide who would be the ephors. Some ephors were elected thanks to a famous deed that made them known among voters. For example, Leon, ephor in 419/418, had won the quadriga race at the Olympic Games in 440, while his son Antalkidas had concluded a treaty with Persia in 387 before becoming ephor in 370/369. The famous general Brasidas was elected in 431 just after his victory against Athens at Methone.

== Eponymous ephor ==
One of the ephors was eponymous, i.e. he gave his name to the year, like the eponymous archon in Athens. He was probably designated during the elections as the candidate with the loudest shouts overall. The eponymous ephor did not have any additional power compared to his colleagues; it was only a prestigious position. In 413/2, the ordinary ephor Endios is thus described by Thucydides as wielding a lot of influence within the college, even though the eponymous was Onomantios.

As the eponymous ephors were used as dates, a list compiling their names existed in Sparta, and is mentioned by Polybius. This list was perhaps published by Apollodoros and Sosicrates, whose lost works were used by Diogenes Laertius. The list went at least as far as 556 (the year of Chilon's ephorate) and possibly up to 754 (during the reign of Theopompos as ancient authors believed). However, Diogenes lived in the 3rd century AD, and even his sources dated from the Hellenistic era, long after the events.

== Legal power ==
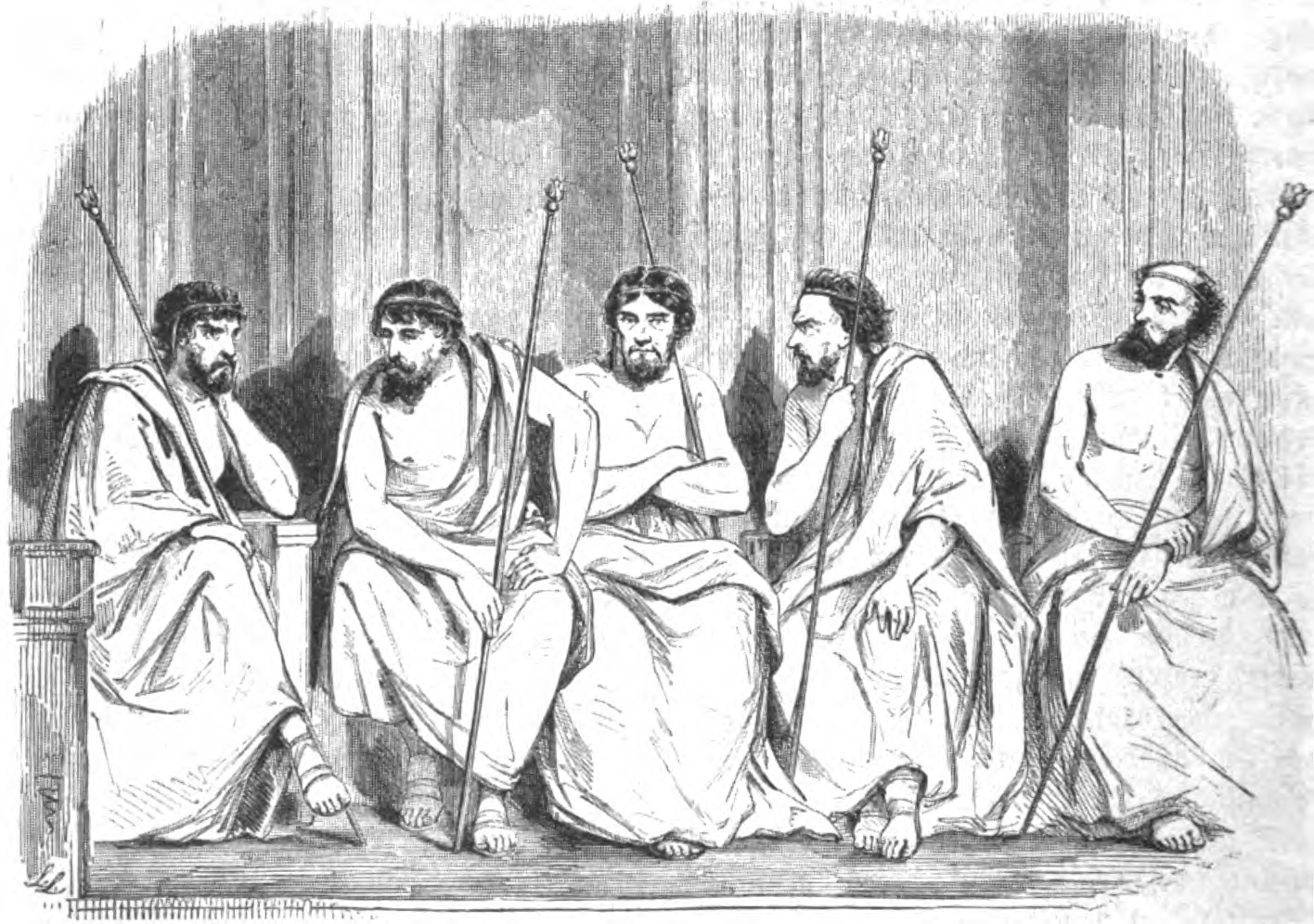
1862 imagining of the ephors

The ephors held numerous duties in legislative, judicial, financial, and executive matters. Following Lycurgus's "Asteropus" in 620 BC (increase in the power of the ephorate), the ephors became the ambassadors of Sparta. They handled all matters associated with foreign relations, including the creation of treaties with foreign powers and meeting with emissaries to discuss foreign politics. They held power within Sparta by also acting as the Presidents of the assembly and the justices of the supreme civil court as well as controlling army composition. The ephors needed a majority vote to make decisions binding and minority or dissenting decisions were not accepted by the assembly.

According to Plutarch, every autumn at the crypteia, the ephors would pro forma declare war on the helot population so that any Spartan citizen could kill a helot without fear of blood guilt. This was done to keep the large helot population in check. Plutarch also stated that every eight years the ephors would watch the skies on a moonless night. If shooting stars occurred, it was up to the ephors to decide whether one or both of the kings had transgressed in his dealings with the gods. A transgression could include any behavior that dishonored the Greek pantheon. Unless the oracle from Delphi or Olympia stated otherwise, the ephors had the ability to depose the offending king or kings. Plutarch also stated that the ephors tried cases involving contracts among citizens. He further reported that each ephor specialized in a different type of disputed contract.

According to Pausanias, the ephors served with the Gerousia on the Supreme criminal court of Sparta. This included presiding over treason, homicide, and other offenses that carried serious punishments. These punishments included exile, death, and disfranchisement.

Ephors had the authority to summon and preside over the assembly's regular meetings in the fifth century BC. Initially this power was only assigned to kings in early years. However, with the passing of the Great Rhetra regular meetings became mandated. By the late sixth century BC, the ephors had acquired this authority to oversee the assembly and could use this power against the kings of Sparta. For example, they used this authority to force King Anaxandridas II to change his conjugal arrangements to their advantage. King Anaxandridas' wife was barren but he refused to divorce her so the ephors forced him to marry a second wife to provide heirs.

Two ephors were always sent on military expeditions to ensure the king acted in line, and if not, could put the king on trial. Many kings were put on trial by the ephors, including Leotychidas, who was found to have accepted a bribe from the Thessalians during his military expedition to Thessaly.

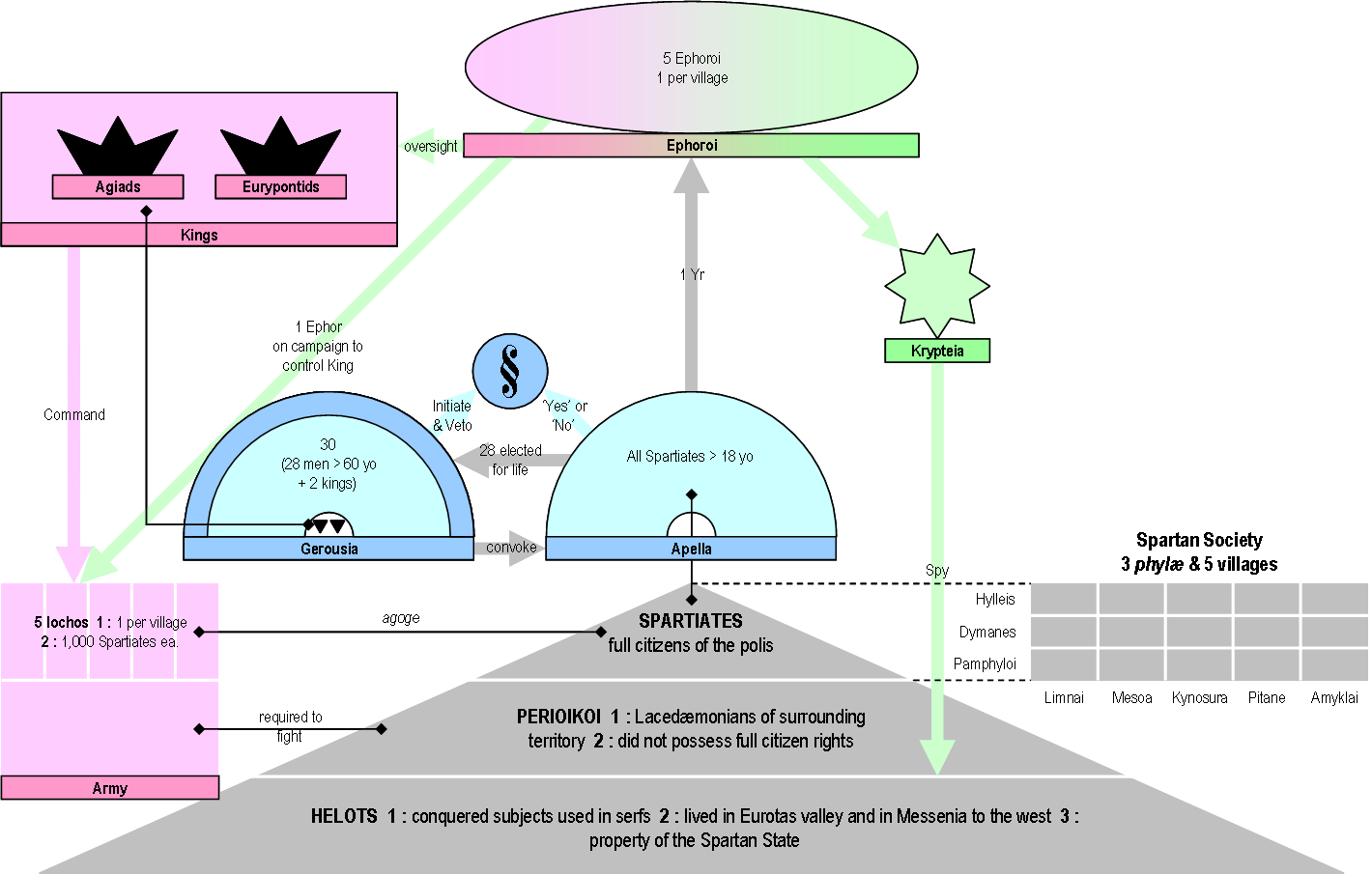
A diagram of the Spartan Constitution

The ephors, along with the Gerousia, held the majority of the power within the Spartan government, as the two kings had to consult either with the ephors or the Gerousia in almost any official matter. The ephors also held power over the Helots and the Perioeci. They controlled the Crypteia, the secret police who repressed the Helots, and they were even able to sentence Perioeci to death without a trial.

== Other duties ==
The congress of the Peloponnesian League was always chaired by an ephor.

The ephors also had the authority to choose three hippagretai (Commanders of the Guard) every year from men over the age of thirty. The chosen hippagretes would then choose three hundred of the best hebontes to form a hippeis. The ephors also were responsible for penalizing disobedience in the military using fines.

Ephors could also intervene in cases of "disturbing the peace". This included punishing underage Spartans indirectly for their offenses against Sparta. This form of retribution would include penalizing the boys' erastes (adult lovers). When men between the ages of twenty and thirty (known as hebontes) committed offenses they were brought before the paidonomos, a magistrate charged with supervising the education of the youth in the agoge. Through this system the ephors could directly penalize the hebontes by giving them large fines.

The ephors paid close attention to the education of young Spartans, and played a significant role in ensuring the education was up to standard. According to Aelian, they would examine the naked bodies of the boys every ten days to ensure they were of proper complexion and fitness and not being overfed, as well as examining the boys' clothes daily to ensure that they fit.

The ephors had their own syssitia, the common meal of Spartan citizens.

== Notable ephors ==
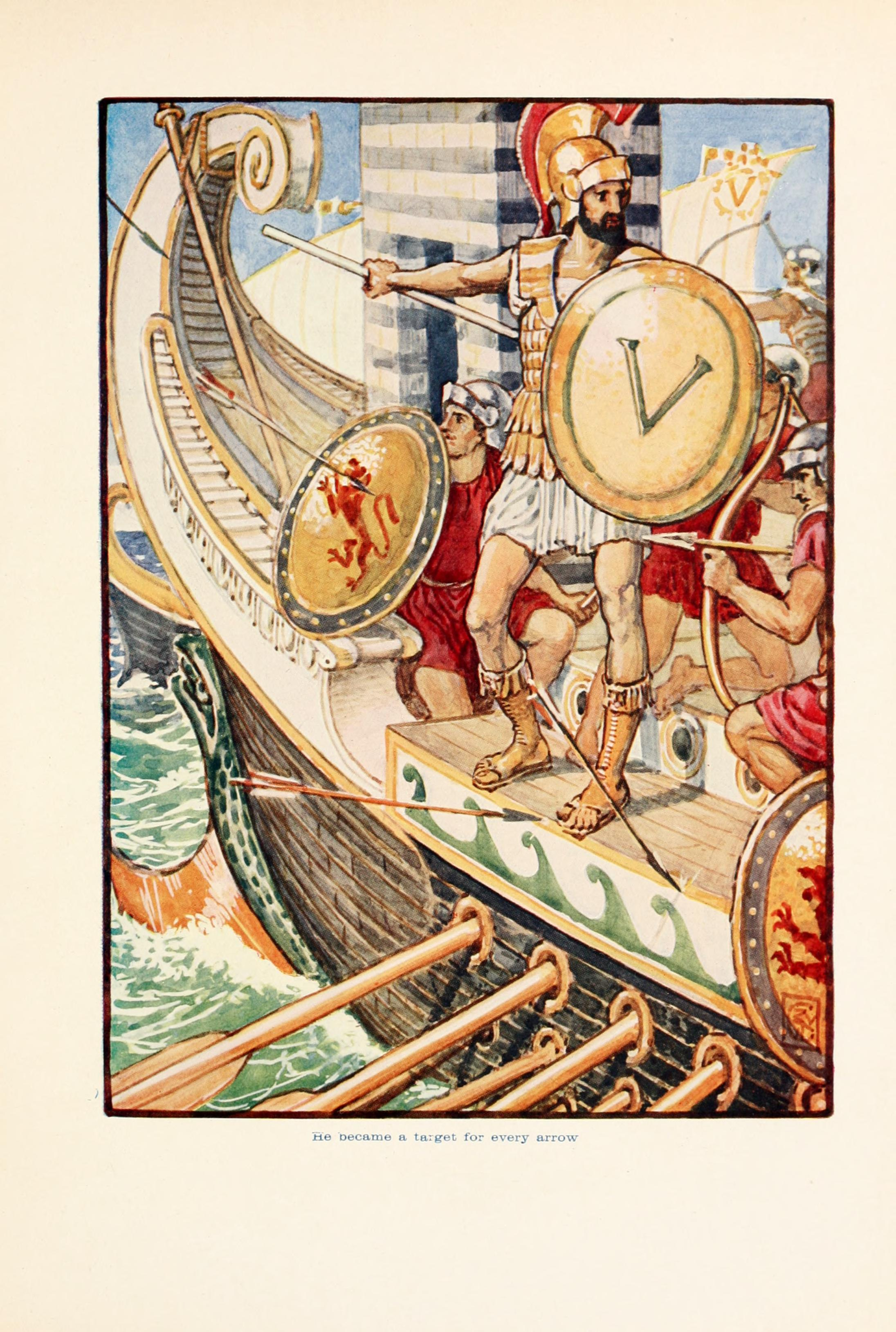
Ephor Brasidas during combat

Only 67 ephors are known by name before the end of the third century BC, out of potentially 3000.

- Endius: Scion of wealthy family, son of Alcibiades (served in 413/2 BC).
- Brasidas: Came from higher class family (served in 431/0 BC).
- Leon: Became an ephor at an older age and was the founder of a Spartan colony and Olympic victor (served in 419/418 BC).
- Antalcidas: Known for being the negotiator of peace treaty, named after him (served in 387/386 BC).
- Sthenelaidas: Known for causing physical division in the voting process by making voters stand in separate spaces to represent yes or no votes. This eliminated the secrecy of the voting process. (served in 432 BC).
- Cleandridas: Known for abandoning the invasion of Athens and returning to Peloponnese in 446 BC. He went voluntarily into exile, with the Spartans condemning him to death in absentia.
- Lysander: Was sent as an ambassador to King Agesilaus II on multiple campaigns but suffered a dispute with King Agesilaus over the locals' loyalty to him. Lysander returned home upon the end of term as ephor (served in 243 BC).
- Nausikleidas: Accompanied and supported King Pausanias on expedition (served in 403 BC).
- Epitadeus: Introduced legislation that destroyed the equal distribution of land that Lukourgos made in the fourth century BC.
- Chilon: Served in 556/5 BC.
- Agesilaos: Named eponymous ephor by his nephew Agis IV and was charged with implementing a new bill which included debt-cancellation and land-redistribution.

== Other Greek poleis with ephors ==
- Euesperides (Benghazi, Libya): The city was a colony of Cyrene and adopted its institutions as a result. It therefore counted ephors and a gerousia.
- Herakleia (Lucania, Italy): The eponymous magistrate of the city was an ephor, because it reproduced the institutions of its mother-city, Taras.
- Cyrene (Libya): Cyrene had a gerousia and a board of five ephors from an early date. It was a foundation of Thera.
- Messene (Peloponnese): Messene took its independence from Sparta in 370/69, but retained some of its institutions, such as the ephors, who are mentioned c. 295.
- Taras (Taranto, Italy): The ephorate is attested in the 3rd century, but considering that its colony Herakleia also had ephors, Taras probably had ephors since the Archaic Era. The office was eponymous in the 3rd century.
- Thera (Santorini Island): A board of three ephors were eponymous magistrates in the city.

== Ephors in modern culture ==
The concept of an ephorate continues to be used by some contemporary organizations which require a monarchical element within a democratic framework. One such organization is the Ephorate of the Rascals, Rogues, and Rapscallions, an American fraternal research society.

The Hellenic Republic Ministry of Culture and Sports contains several regional ephorates that carry out the administration of archaeological investigations in their respective regions.

The Neapolitan Republic's constitution of 1799, written by Francesco Mario Pagano, envisaged what would now be described as a constitutional court, the eforato, but the republic lasted only six months.

Zack Snyder's 2007 film adaptation of the Battle of Thermopylae, 300 (also an adaptation of the comic book of the same title), depicts ephors as priestly class that exercise power by interpreting the words of the Oracle. In the film they are dramatized as elderly lepers with pale skin and lesions. At the beginning of the movie, Leonidas is shown visiting the ephors and proposing a war strategy to them. The ephors then consult the Oracle and refuse Leonidas' plan, showing that they have been bribed by Xerxes I. King Leonidas thus leads his 300 'bodyguards' to Thermopylae without their approval.

Rudolph Maté's 1962 film The 300 Spartans also depicts the ephorate's role in the Battle of Thermopylae. They are shown conflicting with King Leotychidas over the decision to delay the battle until after the religious harvest festival of Carneia. The ephors decide to delay the battle but under the guise of having private bodyguards, King Leonidas marches into battle with 300 Spartans. The ephors are mentioned later in the film when Leonidas receives a letter from his wife informing him that the ephors have the remainder of the Spartan army will not be joining him. Xenathon is a named ephor in the film.

Ephors appear in Steven Pressfield's 1998 Gates of Fire, an historical fiction novel that recounts the Battle of Thermopylae. In Chapter 15, the ephors appear when a delegation of mothers and wives goes to the council, requesting they be allowed to join the battle.

In Kieron Gillen's graphic novel Three, ephors are referenced when Gillen describes the Krypteia and writes "Once a year, the masters declare war on the helots." The ephors were in charge of the Krypteia and declaring war on the helots in order to keep them terrified and controlled. The next scene depicts the ephor, Eurytos, being guided by his soldiers to a helot community where they demand hospitality. Eurytos is killed by a helot revolt and the only surviving soldier returns to Sparta to inform the remaining four ephors. The ephors send soldiers to kill the helots who killed Eurytos stating, "The only thing more unthinkable than a helot killing an ephor is that helot escaping punishment."

== Bibliography ==
=== Ancient sources ===
- Aristotle, Politics.
- Cicero, De re publica, De Legibus.
- Isocrates, Panathenaicus.
- Plato, Epistles.
- Plutarch, Parallel Lives (Cleomenes, Lycurgus), Moralia.
- Xenophon, Constitution of the Lacedaemonians.

=== Modern sources ===
- Paul Cartledge, Sparta and Lakonia, A Regional History 1300–362 BC, London, Routledge, 2002 (originally published in 1979). ISBN 0-415-26276-3
- G. E. M. de Ste. Croix, The Origins of the Peloponnesian War, London, Duckworth, 1972. ISBN 0-7156-0640-9
- Mogens Herman Hansen & Thomas Heine Nielsen, An Inventory of Archaic and Classical Poleis, Oxford University Press, 2004.
- G. L. Huxley, Early Sparta, London, Faber & Faber, 1962. ISBN 0-389-02040-0
- Anton Powell (editor), A Companion to Sparta, Hoboken, Wiley, 2018. ISBN 978-1-4051-8869-2
