= Great Rhetra =

Spartan Constitution or an oracle of Delphi

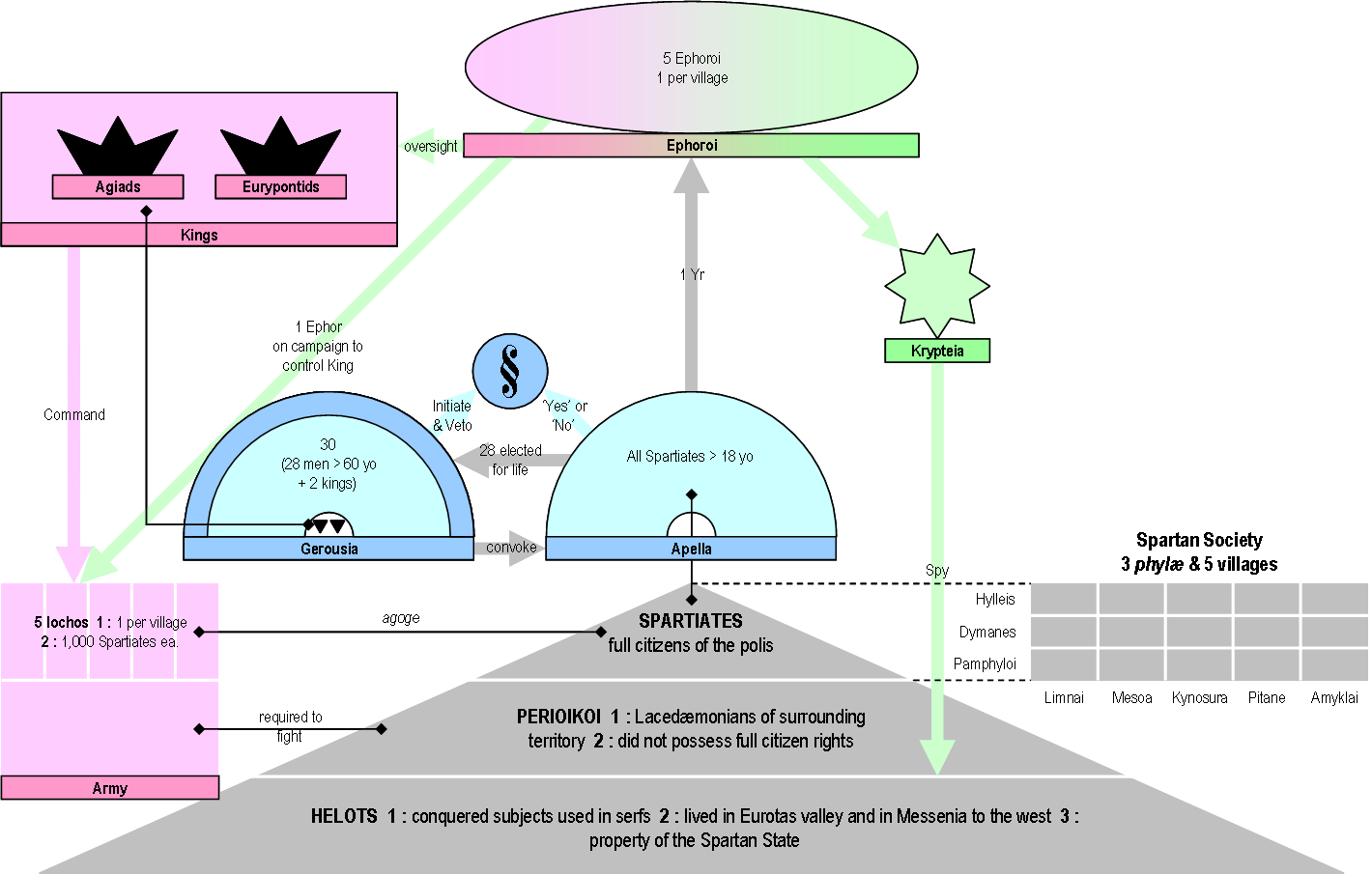
Government and society of Sparta

The Great Rhetra (Greek: Μεγάλη Ῥήτρα, literally: Great "Saying" or "Proclamation", charter) was used in two senses by the classical authors. In one sense, it was the Spartan Constitution, believed to have been formulated and established by the quasi-legendary lawgiver, Lycurgus. In the legend, Lycurgus forbade any written constitution. It was therefore presumed to have been oral.

In a second sense, the rhetra refers to an oracle of Delphi, which was believed to have contained the entire constitution in verse. The credo of being unwritten fails in this case, as a written record of all oracles was maintained by the priests at Delphi. They and others consulted it frequently. It survived long after the demise of the oracle but is missing now, except for fragments handed down by classical authors.

The classical authors and the literate population of Sparta knew better than to suppose that the rhetra went into effect as written by an oracle and remained unchanged. A double tradition developed: tales of the oracular rhetra and stories of the laws of Lycurgus. As there is no history of any constitutional issues dividing the Spartans, they seem to have had no problem accepting its contradictions, perhaps because they knew it was legendary.

Also, the concept of the constitution being truly oral and a state secret presents certain paradoxes, such as how the classical authors knew so much about it. Moreover, the workings of the government of a major Greek state over centuries cannot have been either unwritten or a secret. For example, Cyrus the Younger knew perfectly well that Lysander was forbidden by law to hold a second term as navarch, and yet he requested the Spartan government to make an exception. And finally, if the Spartans were forbidden to write anything down, the existence of inscriptions in the Eurotas valley becomes problematic. The institution of the rhetra in fact coincides with the innovation of the Greek alphabet based on the Phoenician alphabet.

== Genesis of the constitution ==
=== Herodotus' version ===
According to Herodotus, at some time before the reigns of Leon of Sparta and Agasicles, the Spartans "had been the very worst governed people in Greece." Lycurgus, "a man of distinction among the Spartans," decided to ask advice of the Delphic oracle. On reaching the inner sanctum of the temple, he heard:

Oh! thou great Lycurgus, that com'st to my beautiful dwelling,
Dear to Jove, and to all who sit in the halls of Olympus,
Whether to hail thee a god I know not, or only a mortal,
But my hope is strong that thou a god wilt prove, Lycurgus.

Thereupon the oracle delivered the entire constitution of Sparta, which Lycurgus took back and implemented. But, says Herodotus, the Lacedaemonians tell a different story. Lycurgus while regent for his nephew, Labotas, seized the opportunity to establish a new state. Imitating customs he found in Dorian Crete he innovated the Gerousia, the Ephorate, the Enomotiae, the Triacades and the Syssitia. Herodotus does not mention the oracle in the second report.

The associated kings offer a rough date for the genesis of the Great Rhetra. Herodotus says the Rhetra predated the reigns of Agasicles and Leon, who acceded to their thrones about 590 BC. Labotas on the other hand began his reign in 870, implying an early 9th century date of the rhetra. If there was an oracle, the question of what writing system, if any, was the vehicle of the oracles is moot. Linear B was gone and the alphabet had not yet arrived in Greece.

=== Plutarch's version ===
The younger source, Plutarch, speaks less confidently of the details of Lycurgus' life, being faced by that time with multiple traditions, and having no way to judge between them. He says: "There is so much uncertainty in the accounts which historians have left us of Lycurgus, the lawgiver of Sparta, that scarcely any thing is asserted by one of them which is not called into question or contradicted by the rest." After repeating some of the opinions of sources available to him he launches into his own reconstruction based, he says, on the majority opinion. Lycurgus was the younger son of the Eurypontid king, Eunomus. He was thus passed over for the throne in favor of his brother, Polydectes, but the latter died. The inheritance changed by law to Lycurgus. However, Polydectes's wife having been found to be pregnant, Lycurgus became regent instead for the first several months of the infant Charilaus' life. There is no mention of the Agiad Labotas in this version.

These oracles they from Apollo heard,
And brought from Pytho home the perfect word;
The heaven-appointed kings, who love the land,
Shall foremost in the nation's council stand;
The elders next to them; the commons last;
Let a straight Rhetra among all be passed.

— Tyrtaeus, Plutarch Parallel Lives: Lycurgus and Numa.

== Bibliography ==
- Plutarch (1880). "Lycurgus". In Clough, Arthur Hugh (ed.). Plutarch's Lives of Illustrious Men. Translated by Dryden, John. Boston: Little, Brown. pp. 28–43.
