= Antony Andrewes =

English classical scholar and historian (1910–1990)

Antony Andrewes MBE FBA
- Born: 12 June 1910; Tavistock, Devon, England
- Died: 13 June 1990 (aged 80)
- Title: Wykeham Professor of Ancient History

Academic background
- Education: Winchester College
- Alma mater: New College, Oxford

Academic work
- Discipline: Ancient history
- Sub-discipline: Ancient Greece
- Institutions: Pembroke College, Oxford; New College, Oxford
- Doctoral students: John Barron

Antony Andrewes, MBE, FBA (12 June 1910 – 13 June 1990) was an English classical scholar and historian. He was Wykeham Professor of Ancient History at the University of Oxford from 1953 to 1977.

== Early life ==
Andrewes was born in Tavistock, Devon, England, on 12 June 1910. He was educated at Winchester College from 1923 to 1929. He studied at New College, Oxford, between 1929 and 1933.

== Career ==
=== Academic career ===
Andrewes was a Fellow of Pembroke College, Oxford, between 1933 and 1946, and of New College, Oxford, from 1946 to 1953. He was Wykeham Professor of Ancient History from 1953 until his retirement in 1977.

An obituary summarized his academic career thus:

His published work was wide in appeal. The freedom of the specialised article, of which he wrote several of great importance, allowed him to indulge his subtlety of thought, sometimes at the expense of clarity. But where outside control was imposed on content (as in his superb revision of Hill's Sources in collaboration with R. Meiggs), on format (as in his completion of Gomme's great commentary on Thucydides in collaboration with Sir Kenneth Dover) or on both (as in his Greek Tyrants and the Greeks), accuracy, style and insight were near to faultless. His insight which, with less adventurous hypotheses attached, he shared with his predecessor, Wade-Gery, had nothing loose or superficially enthusiastic about it. It was based on an intimate acquaintance with the literature and art of archaic and classical Greece, a deep but never over-pious love for them and an extraordinary sensitivity for humanity, qualities that kept him close to Maurice Bowra."

Kenneth Dover described his work on Thucydides as, "Comprehensive and penetrating treatment... He knew Greek extremely well, and he also knew Greece."

=== Military service ===
On 20 June 1941, he was commissioned in the Intelligence Corps, British Army, as a second lieutenant. His service number was 191239. By January 1945, he was a captain (temporary major).

Andrewes was one of those scholars whose previous contacts with Greece equipped them to give invaluable assistance to the Greek resistance. His services in the northern Peloponnese, where he was dropped by parachute in 1943, were recognised by his being made MBE (military) in 1945. According to a colleague, as soon as he arrived in Greece "he made himself at home with people of all ranks and social levels, knew everybody's story and was immediately loved and revered by all who were capable of such feelings. To the Greeks he was simply Toni a name very properly considered to be Greek from the start."

In later years, Andrewes also supported the resistance movement against the Greek Junta. In gratitude, the restored democracy made him a Commander of the Order of the Phoenix in 1978.

== Later life ==
He died in 1990, the day after his 80th birthday.

== Personal life ==
In 1938 he married Alison (née Hope), the widow of his mentor Alan Blakeway. They had two daughters together. Maurice Bowra dedicated his book On Greek Margins to the couple, and a friend said of their domestic life: "those who dropped in at their home in Manor Place will not forget that open, hospitable, civilised, irreverent and happy house."

== Honours ==
On 4 January 1945, Andrewes was appointed Member of the military division of the Order of the British Empire (MBE) 'in recognition of gallant and distinguished service in the field'. He was elected a Fellow of the British Academy in 1957. The Greek government made him a Commander of the Order of the Phoenix in 1978.

== Works ==
- The Greek tyrants (1956)
- The Greeks (1967); later republished as Greek society
- "The Peace of Nicias and the Sicilian Expedition" and "The Spartan Resurgence", in D. M. Lewis, John Boardman, J. K. Davies, M. Ostwald (editors), Cambridge Ancient History, vol. V, The Fifth Century B.C., Cambridge University Press, 1992, pp. 433–498 [posthumous].
