= Ithomaea =

Ancient Greek festival

The Ithomaia (Ancient Greek: Ιθωμαία) was the main annual festival of the Messenians in antiquity.

== Description ==
The Ithomaia was dedicated to Zeus Ithomatas, whose sanctuary was located at the peak of Mount Ithome in Messenia. This was also the site of an oracle, the base of whose tripod is embedded in the southeastern corner of the Church of the Panagia of Voulkaniotissa, located in the upper monastery of Voulkano, also known as the summit monastery or the katholikon of Voulkano, which was built in the 7th century.

The Ithomaia festival included athletic competitions, musical contests, theatrical performances, and various cultural and artistic events. The entire ceremony centered around the chryselephantine statue of Zeus Ithomatas, where the Nine Muses would bathe it in the klepsydra fountain, which still flows with water today.

The legendary lyre player Thamyris also participated in the Ithomaia. He sought to compete against the Nine Muses in singing, but in their arrogance, they blinded him. As he returned to his homeland in Thrace, while crossing the river in the region, he threw his lyre into it, and thus the river was named Valyra. In later times, this name was given to the town of Valyra, through which the river flows.

After the destruction of Ancient Messene by Alaric, the Ithomaia festival of antiquity came to an end.

== Bibliography ==
- Stephanus of Byzantium (1849). "§ I329.1". In August Meineike (ed.). Ethnica [Ethnicorum quae supersunt] (in Greek).
- William Smith (1890). William Wayte; G. E. Marindin (eds.). A Dictionary of Greek and Roman Antiquities.
