= Battle of Deres =

Battle of 2nd Messenian war with Sparta

- Part of the Second Messenian War
| Date | c. 684 BC? |
| Location | Messenia |
| Result | Disputed |

Belligerents
| Messenia | Sparta |

Commanders and leaders
| Aristomenes | |

The Battle of Deres was a fight between the Spartans and the Messenians which occurred c. 684 BC. It was the first major military engagement of the Second Messenian War. Neither the Spartans nor the Messenians had any allies at the time of the conflict and the outcome of the battle was highly disputed. Neither side won a clear victory, but Aristomenes is said to have achieved more than it seemed that one man could, so that, as he was of the race of the Aepytidae, the Messenians offered to make him king after the battle. However, he declined the offer, preferring instead to become general with absolute powers.
