= Aristomenes (disambiguation) =

Aristomenes (Ancient Greek: Ἀριστομένης) was the name of several people of ancient Greece:

- Aristomenes, king of Messenia in the 7th century BC.
- Aristomenes of Alyzeia, regent and chief minister of Egypt in the Ptolemaic period during the reign of the boy king Ptolemy V around the 2nd century BC.
- Aristomenes of Athens, comic poet of the 5th century BC.
- Aristomenes, a Greek writer on agriculture mentioned by the writers Marcus Terentius Varro and Columella, both of whom wrote (separate) works called De re rustica in which Aristomenes is mentioned. His country is unknown but we know he must have lived in or before the 1st century BC.
- Aristomenes, an otherwise unknown painter, born at Thasos, mentioned in passing by Vitruvius.
- Aristomenes (actor), a comic actor, also from Athens, of the 2nd century AD.
