= Messene Redeemed =

1940 poem by F. L. Lucas

- Author: F. L. Lucas
- Genre: poetry; verse drama
- Publisher: Oxford University Press
- Publication date: October 1940

F. L. Lucas's Messene Redeemed (1940) is a verse drama or long poem (some 900 lines), based on Pausanias, about the struggle for independence of ancient Messene against Sparta. As well as narrating Messenian history from earliest times to the defeat of Sparta at Leuctra (371 BC) and the return of the exiles, it dramatizes two episodes in play-form: one from the First Messenian War (c.743 – 724 BC) – the "honour killing" of his daughter Laodice by Aristodemus at Ithome, and one from the end of the Second (c.685 – 668 BC) – the last hours of Eira.

Some reviewers treated the work as a play (it contains stage-directions), though the author called it a poem. The two dramatized episodes are not labelled 'scenes' or 'acts', but alternate with the linking narration, spoken by an Old Reciter and a Young. The play begins with an Induction set in the 'present' (369 BC), but like The Taming of the Shrew, does not return to it at the end.

== Summary ==
Induction, 369 BC. A traveller, making for Pylos on his way to Messene-in-Sicily, arrives at Ithome, and is surprised to find a new Messene being built near the old site, to the music of flute-players. He is told that the Messenians have returned from exile in Sicily, following Epaminondas's recent victory over Sparta at Leuctra (371 BC). A dramatic performance is about to begin in the temporary theatre. The traveller is invited to join the audience.

=== First Messenian War ===
An Old Reciter enters and intones, in epic style, the story of Messene's origins, the outbreak of the first war against Sparta centuries earlier (743 BC), and the Messenians' retreat to Ithome (c.738 BC).

First scene, early 720s BC. A group of women and girls at the Klepsydra spring on Ithome talk about the war and gossip about men. They are interrupted by the return of two envoys from Delphi, one wounded and dying. King Euphaes and the citizens gather to hear the Pythia's words. Apollo has pronounced that for Ithome to be saved a maiden of the House of Aepytus must be sacrificed. The wounded envoy dies after delivering Apollo's message. Comaetho, daughter of Lyciscus and Praxilla, is chosen – but spared when her parents reveal she was adopted. The people then nominate Laodice, Aristodemus' daughter, beloved of Leon, the other envoy. (Leon, ironically, had not been told the message his comrade was carrying.) Leon tries to save her by claiming that she is with child by him. She denies this. He produces "evidence" and is arrested. Enraged, her father drags her indoors – and emerges moments later, blade dripping, to say that Leon lied. Has Apollo's will been done? The high priest declares the "sacrifice" invalid. The king over-rules him. Leon, maddened by grief and despair, curses Aristodemus and Messene. Comaetho and her parents flee. The scene closes with a touching lament for Laodice by the remaining women and girls.

The Old Reciter resumes, telling of the deaths in battle of Leon and King Euphaes, the hopes raised, then dashed, by the Pythia's second prophecy (the hundred tripods episode), the appearance of Laodice to her father in a dream, Aristodemus' suicide on her tomb, and the defeat and enslavement of the Messenians (c.724 BC).

=== Second Messenian War ===
A Young Reciter enters and, in swifter metre, takes up the story of Aristomenes' revolt at Andania fifty years later in the Second War of independence (c.685 BC). He sings of Aristomenes' guerrilla raids into Laconia, his placing one night of a Spartan shield (defiantly inscribed) on the temple of Athena in Lacedaemon, his subsequent capture with comrades, wounded. Aristomenes alone survives being thrown into Caeadas chasm on Taygetus. He finds his way out by following a scavenging fox, returns "from the dead", gains revenge, and leads the Messenians to the stronghold of Eira (c.679 BC).

Second scene: Eira, eleven years later (c.668 BC); a night of storm. Lysander, a Spartan cowherd, "a pretty lad", enters, apparently a deserter to the Messenians. He's having a secret affair with Timarete, wife of Nicon (a love-scene follows); but now that the Spartans are laying siege, his loyalties waver. When he overhears that the watch have dropped their guard in the atrocious weather, he slips out and alerts the enemy. They launch a surprise attack. Lysander is seen guiding them. Timarete confesses the affair, but denies treason. In the chaos, Aristomenes prevents the revenge killing of Timarete, and rallies the defenders. Theoclus the Seer tells him that the Pythia's third prophecy, the riddle –

"The day a he-goat drinks on Neda's eddying shore
No more can I save Messene. For doom stands at her door."

– is now fulfilled, despite precautions: for he has seen a goat-fig dragging branches in the swollen stream. (Note: In Messenia, ὁ τράγος was used for both he-goat and wild fig.) Eira is doomed. Hearing this, Aristomenes arranges a truce. He leads out the survivors, singing the Song of Exile. They head westwards towards Phigaleia (c.668 BC).

Bringing the narrative down to the 'present' (369 BC), the Old Reciter sings of the founding of New Messene at Zankle in Sicily (c.664 BC), the long years of exile, their priest's dream of Hermes, saying Zeus has willed the Messenians' return. The Young Reciter then rushes in, excited, with news of the Thebans' victory under Epaminondas over the Spartans at Leuctra (371 BC), and of Epaminondas's recalling the exiled Messenians to their ancestral home.

== Verse form ==
The poem is in a variety of metres. The Old Reciter's "epic" narrative is in rhyming hexameters, with varying caesura:

Until once more of Apollo Messene asked her doom
And the priestess shrieked her answer, out from the Pythian gloom:
"Who first at the shrine of Ithome to Zeus shall consecrate
The gift of a hundred tripods, shall hold Messene's fate."
Then high beat hearts in Messene. It seemed a simple thing.
Our own was the shrine, and the secret. Gaily the hammers ring
To fashion a hundred tripods to set before God's face, –
Tripods, not bronze, but of beechwood. No bronze had our stricken race,
Wasted with years of battle. But ah, our land was sold –
A priest of Delphi bartered the word of God for gold.
Then Oebalus the Spartan stole brooding on his way –
By stealth his hands have moulded a hundred cups of clay,
Three-footed, tiny, misshapen, baked by a woodland flame.
In the rags of a roving hunter down Taygetus he came...

But ah, that morning of autumn, when the doors of Zeus stood wide
And the wail of our undoing through a sleepy city cried!
Like toads crawled forth from the darkness, obscene, ill-shapen things...

Those clay things fouled God's altar in the cold cruel light of dawn.

The two dramatized acts are mainly in blank verse:

LEON [fiercely]. Zeus, do not Thou forget!
Make him remember, till his dying hour,
Those blue eyes that he had no pity for.
[Without a word ARISTODEMUS turns and stalks back
through the door into his home.]

EUPHAES [in a low voice].
Look where he goes, the slayer of his child,
Slowly, in silence, with his great head bowed,
As a great bull stalks down his glen alone.

There are also four lyrical choruses, in a range of metres. At a glance the work resembles ancient drama, but its form is not strictly based on classical models.

== Sources ==
The poem closely follows Pausanias Book IV. "Mr Lucas, time after time, is found not to be inventing, either character or episode, but to be following the tradition" (The Times Literary Supplement). There are, however, a small number of minor departures from source. To save time, public nominations replace the drawing of lots. Lucas equates the second envoy returned from Delphi with the young man Pausanias said was in love with Aristodemus' daughter, and who tried to save her. He gives names to the two pairs of unnamed lovers in Pausanias – Leon and Laodice, Lysander and Timarete. To make Aristomenes' survival in Caeadas sound less improbable, he is the last of the captives thrown into the chasm, taking a Spartan with him. To balance the killing of Laodice in the first scene, he invents the sparing of Timarete in the second. And to heighten the drama, he has Theoclus the Seer tell Aristomenes that the "goat-prophecy" has been fulfilled, not before but during the last battle.

== Background and theme ==
Lucas had visited Ithome in 1933. An account of this visit and of the Messene story appeared in his travel book From Olympus to the Styx (1934). Here he stated that he found the story of Messenian heroism more moving than that of Thermopylae, and likened Messene to Poland, which "kept its individuality till it rose again centuries after from the tomb".

The poem was written in the summer of 1938 "as the encroaching shadows of Nazi Germany darkened over Europe", and revised in the winter of 1939-40 "when the shame of the Peace of Munich had been redeemed by the courage of September 1939". Dedicated "To the sorrows and hopes of Abyssinia, Austria, Czechoslovakia, Poland, Finland, Norway, Holland and Belgium" (France fell as the book went to press) and published during the Battle of Britain, it had clear contemporary relevance. Just as Spartan militarism and aggression were in the end defeated by the courage and endurance of freedom-loving Greek cities, so would Nazi militarism and aggression be by the freedom-loving states of the modern world.

"No cause is lost, till heart is lost, though generations fall."

== Reception ==
Reviewers noted that Messene Redeemed was a tract for the times, though timeless in theme. Joan Bennett in The Cambridge Review, remarking that Lucas had made himself "master of the old poetic techniques", described the poem as "written always with scholarly competence, often with lyrical grace, and, here and there, with dramatic power". Andrew Wordsworth in Time and Tide saw it primarily as drama, calling it "a moving play" that "aroused bravery and hope in the reader", and one that "could well be performed by intelligent amateurs". The Times Literary Supplement agreed. By going back to the account in Pausanias, it observed, "[Lucas] has hit upon some singularly lively materials for a drama", and "a noble hero in Aristomenes". The work, however, is not known to have been performed.
