= Androcles (disambiguation) =

Androcles is a legendary Roman slave.

Androcles may also refer to:

- Androcles (politician) (fl. ca. 415 BCE), opposed to Alcibiades at time of the Sicilian Expedition
- Androclus, legendary founder of the Greek city of Ephesus in Asia Minor
- Androcles, Messenian leader in the Second Messenian War
