= Valira =

Valira may refer to:

- Valyra, a village in southern Greece
- Gran Valira, the largest river in Andorra
