= Rhianus =

Rhianus (Greek: Ῥιανὸς ὁ Κρής) was a Greek poet and grammarian, a native of Crete, friend and contemporary of Eratosthenes (275–195 BC).

== Biography ==
The Suda says he was at first a slave and overseer of a palaestra, but obtained a good education later in life and devoted himself to grammatical studies, probably in Alexandria. He prepared a new recension of the Iliad and Odyssey, characterized by sound judgment and poetical taste. His bold atheteses are frequently mentioned in the scholia. He also wrote epigrams, eleven of which, preserved in the Greek Anthology and Athenaeus, show elegance and vivacity. But he was chiefly known as a writer of epics (mythological and ethnographical), the most celebrated of which was the Messeniaca in six books, dealing with the Second Messenian War and the exploits of its central figure Aristomenes, and used by Pausanias in his fourth book as a trustworthy authority. Other similar poems were the Achaica, Eliaca, and Thessalica. The Heracleia was a long mythological epic, probably an imitation of the poem of the same name by Panyasis, containing the same number of books (fourteen).

== Legacy ==
Rhianos also wrote a number of homoerotic epigrams, and was also mentioned in one of Greek poet Constantine P. Cavafy's poems ("Young Men of Sidon (A.D. 400)").
