= Lyciscus of Messenia =

Lyciscus (Ancient Greek: Λυκίσκος), a Messenian, was descended from Aepytus.

In the First Messenian War, the Messenians, having consulted the Delphic oracle, were told that to save their country, they must offer by night, to the gods below, an unstained virgin of the blood of the Aepytidae. The lot fell on the daughter of Lyciscus; but Epebolus, the seer, pronounced her to be unfit for the sacrifice, as being no daughter of Lyciscus at all, but a supposititious child. Meanwhile, Lyciscus, in alarm, took the maiden with him and withdrew to Sparta. Here she died; and several years after, as he was visiting her tomb, to which he often resorted, he was seized by some Arcadian horsemen, carried back to Ithome, and put upon his trial for treason. His defense was, that he had fled, not as being hostile to his country or indifferent to her fate, but in the full belief of what Epebolus had declared. This being unexpectedly confirmed by the priestess of Hera, who confessed that she was herself the mother of the girl, Lyciscus was acquitted.
