= Ithomi =

Ithomi may refer to several places in Greece:

- Ithomi, Karditsa, a Municipal Unit in the Mouzaki Municipality of the Karditsa Regional Unit
- Ithomi, Messenia, a Municipal Unit in the Messeni Municipality of the Messenia Regional Unit

== See also ==
- Ithome (disambiguation)
