= Polychares =

Polychares (Ancient Greek: Πολυχάρης) was the name of several persons in ancient Greece:

- Polychares, one of the Thirty Tyrants who ruled Athens from 404 BC to 403 BC
- Polychares of Messenia, victor in the stadion race of the 4th Olympic Games in 764 BC
