= Giorgos Giannopoulos =

Greek actor

- Γιώργος Γιαννόπουλος
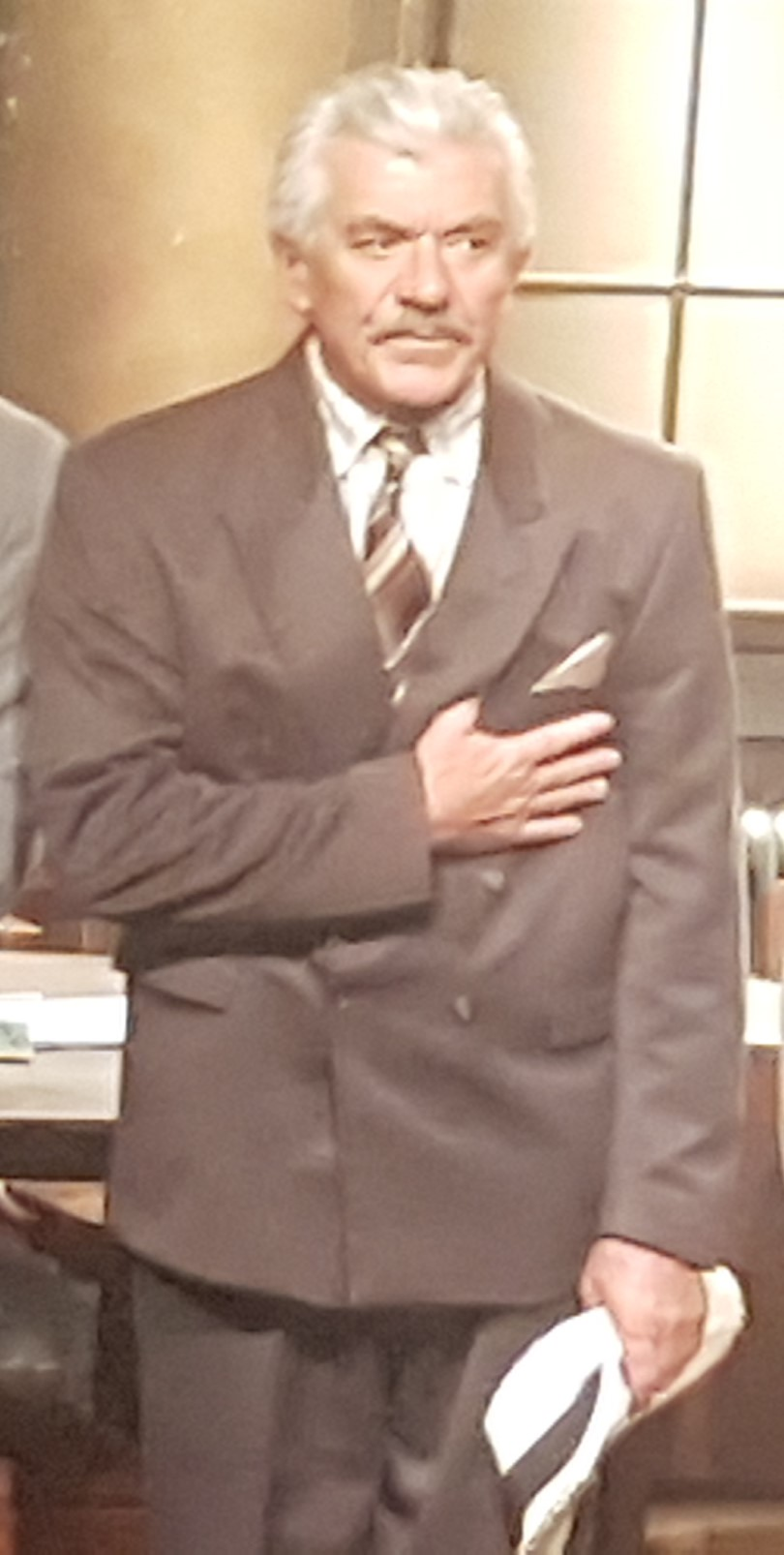
- Born: Georgios Giannopoulos; September 13, 1960 (age 65); Arsinoi, Messenia, Peloponnese, Greece
- Education: Athens Drama School "Giorgos Theodosiadis"
- Occupation: Actor
- Notable work: To soi sou

Giorgos Giannopoulos (born September 13, 1960) is a Greek actor.

== Biography ==
He was born in 1960 in Arsinoi, Messenia, originally from Rado, Arcadia, and grew up in Kalamata. He studied at the Agricultural School of the Aristotle University of Thessaloniki (AUTH), which he eventually abandoned to become an actor. Thus, he enrolled in the youth department of the Athens Drama School.

He has been on the stage for several years, however, he is better known to the television audience. He has participated in many television series, such as Pethaino gia sena (2003), Mavra Mesanyxta (2008), Entimotatoi keratades, Epta thanasimes petheres, Kokkinos Kyklos and Konstantinou & Elenis.

His best known participation is in the comedy television series To soi sou. In the 2023-2024 season, the series H Paralia in the role of Manolis Papagiannakis on ERT1.

== Political ==
He was elected municipal councilor of Ilioupoli with the party of mayor Vasilis Valasopoulos (PASOK), while in the national elections of January 2015 he was a candidate for parliament with Potami in the prefecture of Messenia.
