= First Messenian War =

War between Messenia and Sparta

- Part of Messenian Wars
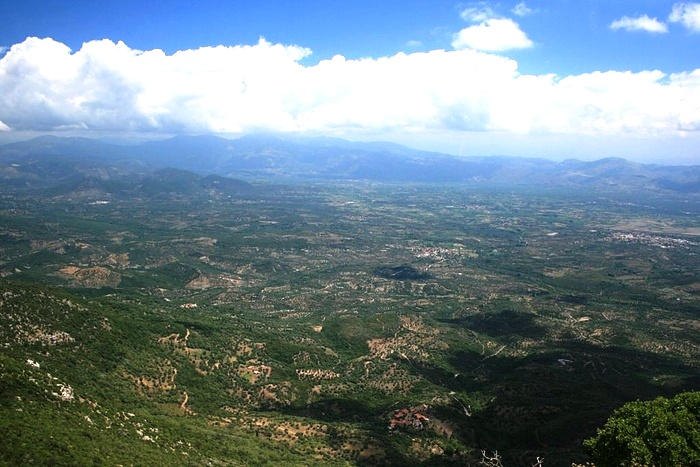
- View over Messenia from the summit of Mt. Ithome
| Date | 743 BC – 724 BC |
| Location | Messenia |
| Result | Spartan victory |
| Territorial changes | Loss of sovereignty by Messenia; transfer of land ownership to the Spartans |

Belligerents
| Sparta | Messenia |

Commanders and leaders
| Alcmenes, Polydorus: Agiad kings; Theopompus: Eurypontid king | Euphaes, king of Messenia, son of Antiochus, grandson of Phintas; Cleonnis |

Strength
| Maximum of 3,000 infantry, 1,500 cavalry | Roughly the same as the Spartan |

Casualties and losses
| 1,800 | 2,700 |

The First Messenian War was a war between Messenia and Sparta. It began in 743 BC and ended in 724 BC, according to the dates given by Pausanias.

The war continued the rivalry between the Achaeans and the Dorians that had been initiated by the purported Return of the Heracleidae. Both sides utilized an explosive incident to settle the rivalry by full-scale war. The war was prolonged into 20 years. The result was a Spartan victory. Messenia was depopulated by emigration of the Achaeans to other states. Those who did not emigrate were reduced socially to helots, or serfs. Their descendants were held in hereditary servitude for centuries, until the collapse of the Spartan state in 370 BC.

== Dates ==
=== Pausanias' standard dates ===
Pausanias says that the opening campaign was a surprise attack on Ampheia by a Spartan force commanded by Alcmenes, Agiad king of Sparta, in the second year of the 9th Olympiad. The end of the war was the abandonment of Mt. Ithome in the first year of the 14th Olympiad. The time of the war is so clearly fixed at 743/742 BC through 724/722 BC that other events in Greek history are often dated by it. Pausanias evidently had access to a chronology of events by Olympiad. The details of the war are not so certain but Pausanias gives an evaluation of his two main sources, the epic poem by Rianos of Bene for the first half and the prose history of Myron of Priene for the second half. Nothing survives now of the sources except fragments.

=== Dates by the archaeology of Taras and Asine ===
A second method of dating presented by John Coldstream takes archaeology into consideration as well as other literary evidence, arriving at somewhat later dates. Argos had entered the war on the Messenian side toward the end of it. They decided to eliminate Asine in reprisal for its assistance to Sparta during the Spartan invasion of Argos. After the war Sparta placed the refugees in a new settlement called Asine on the Messenian Gulf, today's Koroni. The destruction level at the old Asine is dated 710 BC, more precise actually than can be obtained for most archaeological dates.

A second piece of apparently archaeologically supported evidence is the settlement of the Partheniai at Taras (Tarentum) in Italy. During the war while the men were away a certain number of Spartan ladies bore illegitimate children to non-Spartiate fathers, some with husbands stationed in Messenia. These Partheniai were denied citizenship and, being unwelcome in Sparta, they became a civic problem, ultimately staging a rebellion. They were sent off under Phalanthus at the suggestion of the Delphic oracle to found Taras at Satyrion later a suburb of Tarentum. Pottery from there is exclusively Greek and geometric from about 700 BC. Eusebius says Taras was founded in 706 BC. Granting a precision to the 710 date he does not grant to the 700 date and presuming the juveniles were sent away immediately after the war, Coldstream formulates new dates for the war of 730–710 BC.

== Background ==
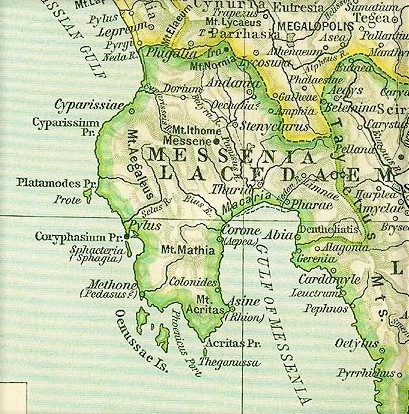
Ancient Messenia

=== Early rejection of the Heraclid king ===
The Peloponnese had been Achaean before the return of the Heracleidae in 1104 BC. The victorious Dorian commanders, who were Heraclids, divided the Peloponnese between them. Temenus took Argos, Cresphontes took Messenia and the twin sons of Aristodemus took Sparta. The previous ruling family of Messenia, the Neleides (descendants of Neleus), had emigrated with the Atreids, rulers of Mycenae and Argos, to Athens. Most of the Achaeans remained in place.

The Dorians colonized Sparta, then a small state on the east of the central Eurotas valley. Theras, their mother's brother, acted as regent for his nephews until they reached majority and then led a colony to Thera. Meanwhile, the Messenians had accepted Cresphontes as king after he married Merope, daughter of Cypselus, king of Arcadia and an Achaean. They gave up some land to another Dorian enclave in Messenia. Subsequently, the noble families of the Achaeans staged an insurrection, assassinating Cresphontes and all but one of his sons in a single coup. The youngest, Aepytus, was being educated in Arcadia.

=== Acceptance of the Aepytidae ===
Aepytus on reaching manhood shortly was restored by the kings of Sparta (Dorian), Argos (Dorian) and Arcadia (Achaean). The Messenian aristocracy was won by gifts and kindness, except for the regicides, who were executed. Aepytus founded a dynasty of kings of Messenia, the Aepytidae. The Heraclid part of the family background was explicitly dropped. The Aepytidae integrated totally into Achaean culture. They took the ancient Achaean (and Pelasgian) shrine on the summit of Mt. Ithome as their own, compelling the Dorians to worship there also. Ultimately under King Phintas they joined the yearly festival to Apollo at Delos, the very central festival and most important place of worship of the Ionians, the descendants of the Achaeans.

This Achaeanizing provoked the Dorians living in Messenia. They viewed themselves as dominant over the Achaeans by right of conquest. They were supported in this view by Sparta, which had maintained a successful Dorian enclave, eventually achieving ascendance over the Achaeans in the Eurotas valley, who became the perioeci.

=== The raid on the temple of Artemis Limnatis ===
The intense ethnic animosity and contention that prevailed between the Dorians and the Achaeans is illustrated by an incident of violence that occurred 25 years prior to the First Messenian War, during a festival at the temple of Artemis Limnatis around 768 BC. This was the year that king Phintas, considered Dorian by the Dorians, brought Messenia to an Ionian festival. The temple was on the border between Messenia and Laconia and only Messenians and Laconians worshipped there. Artemis, sister of Apollo, had long been a popular goddess among the Mycenaean Greeks.

Pausanias relates two versions of the story. The Spartan version tells of the raping of virgins and the killing of the king of the Agiad line in Sparta, Teleklos. Ordinarily festivals and temples were sacred and were conducted on sacred ground in Greece; even hunted men could take refuge in a temple because of the taboo against violence. The Spartan version does not explain why the Messenians came to worship and suddenly began committing rape and murder on sacred ground.

The Messenian story says that the "virgins" were beardless soldiers dressed up as women under the leadership of Teleklos, and that the soldiers intended to get close to the Messenian aristocracy for an attempt at their lives. The usual religious considerations may not have been considered to apply since the shrine was an Achaean center, not a Dorian one. The soldiers selected for their beardlessness turned out to be too inexperienced, though, and the Messenian leaders easily threw them off and assassinated their commander. Pausanias says: "Those are the stories: believe one or the other according to which side you want to be on."

== Cause ==
=== Immediate provocation ===
A generation later "the mutual hatred of the Lakonians and Messenians came to a head." The immediate provocation was an incident of cattle theft. Polychares of Messenia, an athlete and Olympic victor, leased some grazing land from Euaiphnos the Spartan, who promptly sold the cattle to some merchants, claiming pirates had stolen them. As he was making excuses to Polychares, a herdsman of the latter, having escaped from the merchants, intervened to acquaint his master with the real facts. Apologising, Euaiphnos asked Polychares to let his son (Polychares') go with him to obtain the money from the sale, but once over the Spartan border Euaiphnos murdered Polychares' son. Polychares petitioned the Spartan magistrates for justice. Despairing of it, he began to murder such Spartans as he could catch at random. The Spartans demanded extradition of Polychares. The Messenian magistrates insisted on an exchange for Euaiphnos.

At this point the incident exploded into violence at the national level. The Spartans sent a delegation to petition the kings of Messenia, nominally Heraclids. Androcles was for extradition, Antiochus against. The whole history of Spartan-Messenian relations was reviewed, including the assassination of Teleclus 25 years earlier and the discussion became so heated that weapons were drawn. The parties of the two kings assaulted each other and Androcles was killed. Antiochus told the Spartans he would submit the case to the courts at Argos (Dorian) and Athens (Achaean). Antiochus died a few months later and his son, Euphaes, succeeded him. The law case seems to have vanished. Shortly after a Spartan army under both kings of Sparta launched an invasion of Messenia.

=== Possible underlying causes ===
Pausanias states the details of the immediate provocation for war and expresses his view that the underlying cause was ethnic and regional tension between Laconia and Messenia. Various scholars have given speculative analyses of the underlying causes throughout the centuries since Pausanias. A recent historian, William Dunstan, asserts that the Spartan invasion was an alternative to the colonization undertaken by most of the other states of Greece to relieve overpopulation at home. No evidence is offered for this view. He also implies that the Spartan aristocracy were moved by the desire for wealth, based on a cultural floruit and some foreign goods dating to the Orientalizing Period found during the excavation of the temple of Artemis Orthia in Sparta. No such motives appear in the classical sources. As Dunstan points out, after about 600 BC Spartan luxuries were in deficit. The Spartan economy improved significantly with the inflow of dues from the new helot class of Messenia. There is no evidence that this economic arrangement was intended beforehand as a cause of the war.

The strongest case for an underlying, and in this case ulterior, Spartan motive for the war is an admission by one of the Spartan kings that the Spartans needed Messenian land. The Spartan Constitution was already in effect by the time the war broke out. The Spartans had already produced a professional army, which is evidenced not only by their tactics in the war but by the reluctance of the Messenians to engage them. Lycurgus had redistributed all the land in Laconia, creating 39,000 equal plots, of which 9000 went to the Spartiates and 30,000 to the Perioeci. The source of this information, Plutarch, states two opinions as to the location of the 9000: either 6000 originally in Lacedaemon with 3000 in Messenia, added by the king Polydorus, victor of the First Messenian War, or 4500 in each region. Aristotle later stated that the Spartans could support 3000 infantry and 1500 cavalry. Each Spartiatate by law had to have his own kleros, an inalienable plot of land. Burckhardt notes that Polydorus, questioned whether he wanted to go to war against brothers (presumably, Dorians integrated into Messenian society) replied: "All we want is land not yet distributed; that is, not yet divided by lot for our people."

Thucydides states that Sparta controlled 2/5 of the Peloponnese, which according to Nigel Kennel is 8,500 km^{2} (3,300 sq mi). Using this figure as a rough estimate of the amount of land occupied by 39,000 klaroi obtains a figure of 54 acres (22 ha) per klaros, a significant agricultural estate. As citizenship and other social status depended on the possession of one the availability of land must have been a strong motive.

== Course ==
=== The capture of Ampheia for use as a Spartan base ===
Despairing finally of remedies at law for the murders of their citizens the Spartans resolved to go to war without the usual heraldic notification or any other warning to the Messenians. Alcmenes assembled an army. When it was ready they swore an oath not to stop fighting until they had taken Messenia no matter whether the war was long or short and regardless of the casualties and cost.

The war's first battle was the Spartan attack on Ampheia, a city of unknown location now, but probably on the western flank of Taygetus. A swift night march brought them to the gates, which stood open. There was no garrison, nor were they in any way expected. The first sign the Ampheians had of war was the Spartans rousing people out of bed to kill them. Some few took refuge in the temples; others fled for their lives. The Spartans sacked the city then turned it into a garrison for the conduct of further operations against Messenia. The Messenian women and children were captured. The men who had survived the massacre were sold into slavery.

When the news of Ampheia spread a crowd gathered at the capital, Stenykleros ("rough acres," location unknown, perhaps under Messene), from all of Messenia. They were addressed by the king, Euphaes. He encouraged them to be true men in the hour of need, assuring them that justice and the gods were on their side because they had not attacked first. Subsequently, he placed the entire citizenry under arms and arranged for their training.

From the beginning Euphaes relied on fixed defenses. He fortified and garrisoned the towns but avoided forays against the Spartan army. For two seasons more the Spartans raided the moveable wealth, especially confiscating grain and money, but were ordered to spare capital equipment such as buildings and trees, which might be of use after the war. In this matrix of fortified points the Spartans could never successfully siege any one point. Declining to attack the main Spartan army, the Messenians could only assault undefended Spartan border communities when the opportunity arose.

=== The skirmish for the fortified camp on the ravine ===
In the fourth campaigning season; that is, in the summer of 739 according to Pausanias' dating scheme, Euphaes resolved to bring the war to the Spartans at Ampheia ("let loose the full blast of Messenian anger"). The Spartans were denying the Messenians use of the countryside for agriculture. Subsequent events show that this denial was untenable in the long term for the Messenians. They needed to strike a blow to remove the Spartan presence from their country.

Euphaes judged that his army was sufficiently trained to oppose the Spartan professional soldiers. He readied an expedition and subsequently marched out of the capital in what must have been the direction of Ampheia. That his first concern was to construct a fortified base nearer to Ampheia is indicated by the transport of "timber and all the materials for stockades" in his baggage train. No mention is made of any intelligence on the current position of the Spartan army. His actions were not those of a general expecting a battle that day. His intent must have been to move the start line of future attacks closer to the enemy, a standard tactic later used by the Roman army with repeated success.

The Spartans on the other hand were tracking his every movement. They sent immediately for reinforcements from Sparta, who marched directly for the enemy, encountering the Messenians in the middle between Ithome and Taygetus. Their approach was no surprise to Euphaes. Choosing his ground carefully he selected a site with one side bordering an impassable ravine between the Messenians and the Spartans. Nino Luraghi finds it "rather odd" that Euphaes stationed his army where it could not be attacked by the Spartans. Whether he questions the account or the general is not stated, but seen from a different view, the problem disappears.

Subsequent events demonstrate that Euphaes intended to build a fortified camp, which is what he did. The main goal of siting such a camp is to deny the enemy access to it. The Spartan commanders understood Euphaes very well. They sent a force upstream to cross the ravine and outflank the Messenians, preventing them from building a camp, but Euphaes had anticipated this move. Following the Spartans along the other side of the ravine with 500 cavalry and light infantry under Pytharatos and Antandros they prevented the Spartans from crossing. The camp was finished the next day.

The location of the ravine remains unknown nor does the battle have a name. Blocked, the Spartan army withdrew from Messenia. As it did not settle the war the battle is most often called inconclusive. As far as the tactical goals of the two armies are concerned, it was a Messenian victory.

=== The pitched battle in the vicinity of Ampheia ===
Both sides knew that in the next campaigning season a major battle would be fought. Meanwhile, at Sparta Alcmenes died and was replaced by his son, Polydorus. Cleonnis commanded the Messenian fortified camp. At the start of the season he took his command to the east to engage a Spartan army that was marching west from Sparta.

==== Disposition of troops ====
They met on the plains beneath Taygetus at a still unknown location in Messenia, perhaps near Ampheia. The battle was mainly a heavy infantry engagement. The terms "light infantry" and "infantry" are being used by Pausanias. The Spartan army was mainly infantry. Some "light infantry" were present as Dryopians, an ethnic group of Pelasgians whose ancestors had been driven from Dryopia by the Dorians, who then called it Doris, and from their Achaean place of refuge, Asine, when Dorian Argos subjected it. They were finally offered protection by Dorian Sparta. These were drafted by the Spartans. Also present was a contingent of Cretan archers. Light troops played little part in the battle; they were mainly spectators.

The two armies faced each other in traditional start lines. Euphaes yielded the command of the Messenian center to Cleonnis, while he took the left flank with Antandros, and Pythartos on the right. Facing Cleonnis was Euryleon, a noble Spartan and a Cadmid, with Polydorus on his left and Theopompus on the right. The latter in his harangue appealed to glory, wealth and the oath they had all taken. Euphaes chose to present death or slavery, pointing to the fate of Ampheia. The signal was given to advance simultaneously on both sides.

==== The problem of the phalanx ====
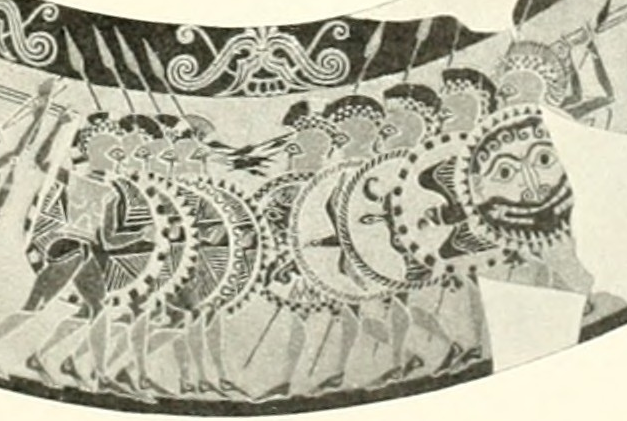
Hoplites, Chigi Vase

Pausanias' description of the battle creates an apparent historical paradox. He refers to "the special characters of the two forces in their behaviors and in their frame of mind." The Messenians "ran charging at the Lakonians reckless of their lives ...." "Some of them leapt forward out of rank and did glorious deeds of courage." The Spartans on the other hand were "careful not to break rank." Says Pausanias, "... knowledge of war was something they had been brought up to, they kept a deeper formation, expecting the Messenians not to hold a line against them for as long as their own would hold ...."

The Spartan tactic being described is that of the phalanx, the unbroken line of men creating a killing zone in front of them. The chief weapon of the ancient Greek phalanx was the spear. Pausanias says that those who tried to plunder the dead "were speared and stabbed while they were too busy to see what was coming,...."

The paradox is that there is no supporting evidence of the use of the phalanx in Greece at that time. Anthony Snodgrass defined "the hoplite revolution," which included both the use of the phalanx in Greece and standardization of a "hoplite panoply" of arms and equipment. The panoply consisted of artifacts adapted from previous models: corselet, greaves, ankle guards, closed "Corinthian" helmet, large round shield with a band for the arm and a side grip, spear, long steel sword. Each element except the greaves is dated to 750-700 BC, perhaps earlier.

They are first depicted together on Proto-Corinthian vases of 675 BC for the panoply and the phalanx around 650 BC, much too late for either the Great Rhetra or the First Messenian War. Snodgrass dates the small figures of hoplites found in Sparta, "a sign of a unified and self-conscious hoplite class," as he believes, to not before 650. He then questions the date of the Great Rhetra, implying it should be reinterpreted or moved to the 7th century.

After Snodgrass published his analysis of pottery decoration there was a double effort to bring the Great Rhetra to a later time and find phalanxes in an earlier time, neither successful. The earliest evidence that John Salmon found was the vase paintings of the Macmillan Painter, who painted what appear to be phalanxes around the shoulders of Proto-Corinthian aryballoi. The Chigi Vase, for example, shows the overlapping shields, the spears, the grips of the shields and the corselets and closed helmets. It is dated 650; another, the Macmillan aryballos, to 655. The earliest of the series is an aryballos from Perchora dated 675, showing matched pairs, which are not necessarily phalanxes, but they fight in the presence of a flautist. These musicians were specific to phalanxes. They coordinated its movements.

The only supporting evidence for the phalanx therefore is dated to the time of the Second Messenian War, not the First. However, this is proof from a deficit. The vases may only demonstrate that depictions of phalanx warfare began at that time, not that phalanxes did. Pausanias on the other hand is positive evidence. Moreover, attempts to discount or select out what he says often create other problems. He is a vital part of all the evidence for the period.

=== Establishment of a fixed defense at Mt. Ithome ===
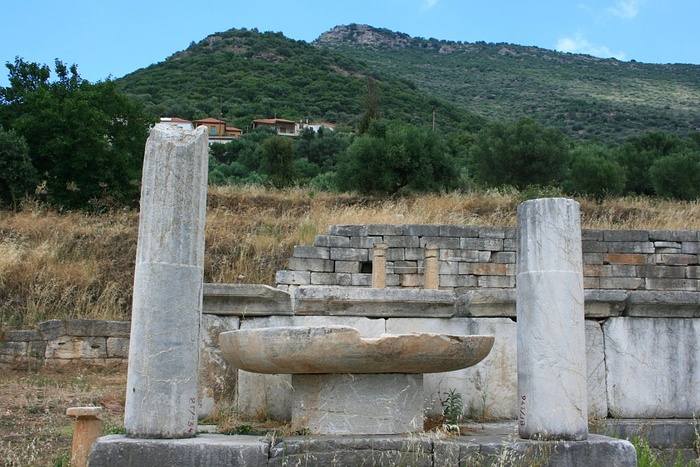
Mt. Ithome

Not wanting to experience another such battle, the Messenians fell back to the heavily fortified Mount Ithome. This is when the Messenians first sent for help from the Oracle at Delphi. They were told that a sacrifice of a royal virgin was the key to their success and the daughter of Aristodemus, a Messenian hero, was chosen for the sacrifice.

Upon hearing of this, the Spartans held off from attacking Ithome for several years, before finally making a long march under their kings and killing the Messenian leader. Aristodemus was made the new Messenian king and led an offensive, meeting the enemy and driving them back into their own territory.

=== The Fall of Mt. Ithome ===
The Spartans then sent an envoy to Delphi and their following of her advice caused Messenian reverses so great that Aristodemus committed suicide and Ithome fell. The Messenians who had fortified themselves on the mountain either fled abroad or were captured and enslaved.

== Legacy ==
Sparta, under the rule of a diarchy, suddenly gained wealth and culture with the "socio-economic basis" of classical Sparta emerging from this war and expansion. In 685 BC, a helot revolt caused a Second Messenian War.

== In literature ==
F. L. Lucas's Messene Redeemed (1940) is a verse drama, based on Pausanias, about Messenian history, including episodes from the First Messenian War.

== Bibliography ==
- Coldstream, John Nicolas (2005) [2003]. Geometric Greece: 900-700 BC. Taylor & Francis e-Library (2nd, ebook ed.). London: Routledge (Taylor & Francis).
- Pausanias (1918). Description of Greece. Translated by W.H.S. Jones; H.A. Ormerod. London: Robert Hale Ltd.
- Snodgrass, A.M. (1965). "The Hoplite Reform and History" (PDF). The Journal of Hellenic Studies. 85: 110–122. doi:10.2307/628813. JSTOR 628813.
