= Aristodemus of Messenia =

Aristodemus (Ancient Greek: Ἀριστόδημος) was a man of ancient Messenia, who was one of the chief Messenian heroes in the First Messenian War.

In the sixth year of that war the Messenians consulted the oracle at Delphi known as the Pythia, and the ambassador Tisis brought back the answer that the preservation of the Messenian state demanded that a virgin girl of the house of the Aepytids should be sacrificed to the gods of the lower world. When the daughter of Lyciscus was drawn by lot, the seer Epebolus declared that she was a stand-in, and not actually a daughter of Lyciscus. Hereupon Lyciscus left his country and went over to the Spartans.

As, however, the oracle had added, that if, for some reason, the maiden chosen by lot could not be sacrificed, another might be chosen in her stead, Aristodemus, who likewise belonged to the house of the Aepytids, came forward and offered to sacrifice his own daughter for his country.

A young Messenian, however, who loved Aristodemus's daughter, opposed this plan, and declared that he as her betrothed had more power over her than her father. When the boy that his argument would not sway Aristodemus, in order to save the girl's life, he declared that she was pregnant by him, and therefore no longer a virgin. Aristodemus, enraged at this assertion, murdered his daughter and opened her body to refute the boy's claim.

The seer Epebolus, who was present, now demanded the sacrifice of another maiden, as Aristodemus's daughters death had not been a sacrifice, but murder. But Euphaes, king of Messenia, persuaded the Messenians, who wanted to kill the boy who in their judgment had been the cause of the girl's death, that the command of the oracle was fulfilled, and as he was supported by the Aepytids, the people accepted his decision.

When the news of the oracle and the manner of its fulfillment became known at Sparta, the Spartans were despondent, and for five years they refrained from attacking the Messenians, until at last some favorable signs in the sacrifices encouraged them to undertake a fresh campaign against Ithome. A battle was fought, in which king Euphaes lost his life, and as he had left no heir to the throne, Aristodemus was elected king by the Messenians, even though some Messenians declared him unworthy on account of having murdered his own daughter.

This happened around 729 BCE. Aristodemus continued the war against the Spartans, and in 724 BCE he gained a great victory over them. The Spartans now endeavored to achieve by fraud what they had been unable to accomplish in the field, and their success convinced Aristodemus that his country was headed for destruction. In his despair he committed suicide on the tomb of his daughter, and a short time after, in 722 BCE, the Messenians were obliged to recognize the domination of the Spartans.
