= Ithome (disambiguation) =

Ithome is a mountain in Messenia, a regional unit of Greece

== Other locations ==
- Ithomi (disambiguation), two places in Greece
- Ithome (Thessaly), a town of ancient Thessaly, Greece
- Ithome, the ancient settlement over which Epaminondas built Ancient Messene

== Science ==
- Ithome (moth), a genus of moths
- ithome, a species of Appias (genus)

== Other ==
- Ithome (mythology)
- ITHome (website), Chinese technology portal website and forum
