= Messenian Wars =

Messenian Wars refers to the wars between Messenia and Sparta in the 8th and 7th centuries BC as well as the 4th century BC.

- First Messenian War
- Second Messenian War
- Third Messenian War
