= Messenia (ancient region) =

Messenia Μεσσηνία
- Region of Ancient Greece
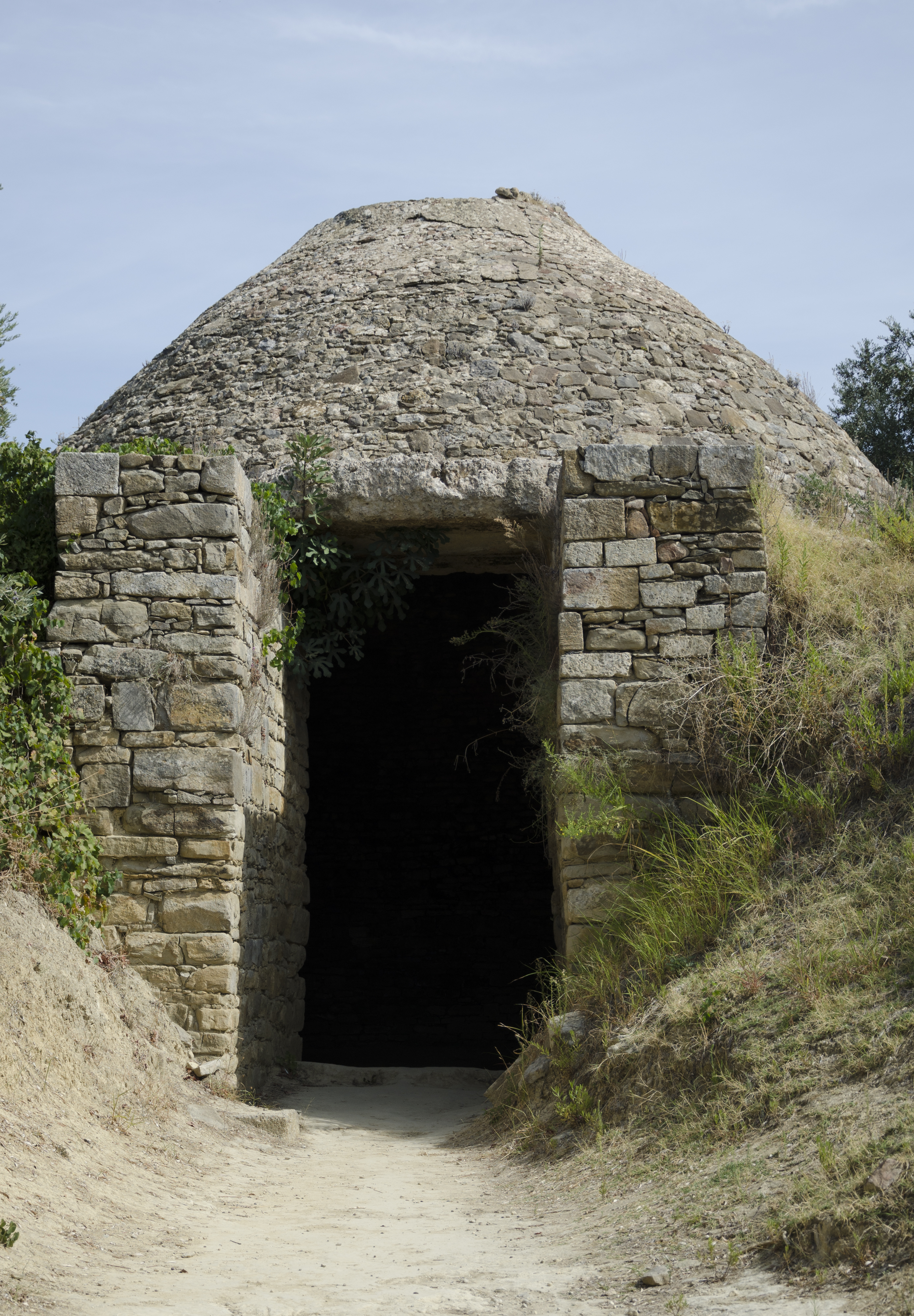
- Burial chamber, Pylos

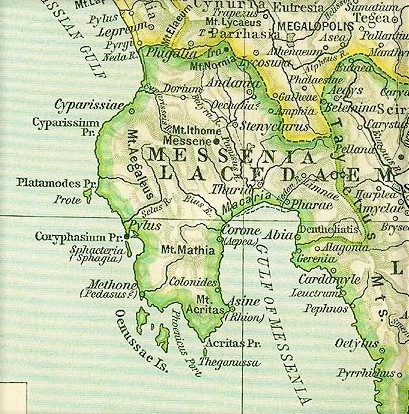
- Map of ancient Messenia
- Location: Peloponesse
- Major cities: Messene
- Dialects: Doric

Messenia (Ancient Greek: Μεσσηνία) was an ancient district of the southwestern Peloponnese, more or less overlapping the modern Messenia region of Greece. It occupied the peninsular region usually called by the same name along with some of the mainland. To the north it had a border with Elis along the Neda river. From there the border with Arcadia ran along the tops of Mount Elaeum and Mount Nomia and then through foothills of Taygetus. The eastern border with Laconia went along the Taygetus ridge up to the Koskaraka river, and then along that river to the sea, near the city of Abia. The Ionian Sea forms the peninsula's western border, and the peninsula and mainland sections enclose the Messenian Gulf to the south.

Ancient Messenia existed continuously without change of name and with little change of territory to the modern Regional Unit of Greece of the same name.

== History ==
=== Bronze age ===
The earliest inhabitants of Messenia were thought by the Greeks of the Classical period to have been 'Pelasgians', with Messene being associated with the Pylos' Further province, attested as pe-ra3-ko-ra-i-ja (Peraikoraija, the r can be read as both an r or l) as in other regions of Greece. Supposedly, the Hellenic tribes had then arrived in Greece, and Messenia was settled by Aeolian Greeks. The Mycenaean city of Pylos has been identified with the modern site of Ano Englianos, in western Messenia. Excavations at Pylos and Nichoria have revealed for Messenia's late Bronze Age (14th century BC) a bureaucratic, agricultural kingdom ruled by the wanax at Pylos. The Messenians spoke Mycenaean Greek, and worshipped the Greek gods at local shrines like that at Sphagianes. During the legendary Dorian invasion of the Peloponnese during the Greek Dark ages, Messenia was supposedly invaded by Dorians under Cresphontes, arriving from Arcadia. They took as their capital Stenyclarus in the northern plain, and then extended, first their suzerainty, and then their rule over the whole district.

=== Archaic period ===
During the Archaic period the relative wealth of Messenia in fertile soil and favourable climate attracted the neighbouring Spartans. The first Messenian War broke out—as a result of the murder of the Spartan king Teleclus by the Messenians, it was claimed, which, in spite of the heroism of King Euphaes and his successor Aristodemus ended in the subjugation of Messenia by Sparta (c. 720 BC). Two generations later the Messenians revolted and under the leadership of Aristomenes kept the Spartans at bay for some seventeen years (685—668 BC). Descriptions of this revolt indicate that Messenia was allowed to retain a certain degree of autonomy after the first war, since they describe battles between organized armies on both sides. However, the stronghold of Ira (Eira) finally fell after a siege of eleven years. As the object of the Spartans was to increase the number of lots of land for their citizens, many of the conquered Messenians (those who did not manage to leave the area) were reduced to the condition of Helots. The Spartan poet Tyrtaeus describes how the Messenians endured the insolence of the masters:

As asses worn by loads intolerable,
So Them did stress of cruel force compel,
Of all the fruits the well-tilled land affords,
The moiety to bear to their proud lords.

— Bury and Meiggs, "A History of Greece", 4th Ed

=== Classical period ===
The Messenians revolted again in 464 BC, after a severe earthquake destroyed Sparta and caused great loss of life. The insurgents defended themselves for some years on the rock-citadel of Ithome, as they had done in the first Messenian War. The Spartans were unable to expel them from their stronghold on Mt. Ithome and so agreed to an Athenian mediated truce whereby the leading Messenians left the Peloponnese and were settled by the Athenians at Naupactus in the territory of Ozalian Locris.

=== Pre-Hellenistic to Hellenistic period ===
After the decisive Battle of Leuctra in 371 BC, when the Spartans suffered a severe defeat at the hands of Thebes, Epaminondas invaded Messenia, and liberated it from Spartan rule. Epaminondas invited the exiled Messenians scattered in Italy, Sicily, Africa and elsewhere to return to their country. The city of Messene was founded in 369 BC to be the capital of the country and, like Megalopolis in Arcadia, became a powerful check on Sparta. Other towns, as well, were founded or rebuilt at this time, though a great part of the land still remained very sparsely populated. Although quite independent, Messenia never became really powerful or able to stand without external support. After the fall of the Theban power, to which it had owed its foundation, it became an ally of Philip II of Macedon and avoided further conflict in the 4th century BC. Subsequently, the Messenians joined with the Achaean League, and Messenian troops fought as part of the Achaean force under Antigonus Doson at the Battle of Sellasia in 222 BC. Philip V sent Demetrius of Pharos to seize Messene, but the attempt failed and cost the life of Demetrius. Soon afterwards the Spartan tyrant Nabis succeeded in taking the city, but was forced to retire by the timely arrival of Philopoemen and the Megalopolitans. A war afterwards broke out with the Achaean League, during which Philopoemen was captured and put to death by the Messenians (183 BC), but Lycortas took the city in the following year, and it again joined the Achaean League, though much weakened by the loss of Abia, Thuria and Pharae, which broke loose from it and entered the League as independent members.

=== Roman period ===
In 146 BC, the Messenians, together with the other states of Greece, were brought directly under Roman sway. For centuries there had been a dispute between Messenia and Sparta about the possession of the Ager Dentheliales on the western slope of Taygetus: after various decisions by Philip II of Macedon, Antigonus, Lucius Mummius, Julius Caesar, Mark Antony, Augustus Caesar and others, the question was settled in 25 AD by Tiberius and the Senate in favour of the Messenians.

== See also ==
- Messene (mythology)

== Bibliography ==
- Homer, The Iliad
- Herodotus, The Histories
- Pausanias, Description of Greece
