= Battle of the Great Foss =

Ancient defeat of Messenia by Sparta

Date	c. 682 BC?
Location	Peloponnesus
Result	Spartan victory

Belligerents
Messenia; Arcadia	Sparta

Commanders and leaders
Aristomenes; Androcles; Fidas; Aristocrates II	

The Battle of the Great Foss occurred in 682 BC during the Second Messenian War (685–668 BC). The word "foss" derives from the Latin fossa, meaning "ditch" or "trench." According to Pausanias the outcome of the battle was determined by trickery. The Spartans bribed Aristocrates of Orchomenus, the king of the Arcadians, to withdraw his men just as the battle was beginning. This resulted in the slaughter of the Messenians. Aristocrates was later stoned to death by the Arcadians for this treachery.

== Sources ==
- Montagu, John Drogo. Battles of the Greek and Roman Worlds: A Chronological Compendium of 667 Battles to 318BC. Mechanicsburg, PA: Greenhill Books, 2000.
