= Aristodimeio =

Aristodimeio Αριστοδήμειον
- Community
- Location within Greece
- Coordinates: 37°08′N 21°58′E
- Country: Greece
- Administrative region: Peloponnese
- Regional unit: Messenia
- Municipality: Messini
- Municipal unit: Ithomi
- Elevation: 50 m (160 ft)

Population (2021)
  - Community: 236
- Time zone: UTC+2 (EET)
  - Summer (DST): UTC+3 (EEST)
- Postal code: 240 13

Aristodimeio (Greek: Αριστοδήμειο, before 1919: Χασάμπασα - Chasampasa) is a local community (topiki koinotita) of the municipal unit (dimotiki enotita) Ithomi, of the municipality (dimos) of Messini within the regional unit (perifereiaki enotita) of Messenia in the region (perifereia) of Peloponnese, one of 13 regions into which Greece has been divided. Before 2011 it held the same position in the administrative hierarchy, according to Law 2539 of 1997, the Kapodistrias Plan, except that Ithomi was an independent deme and Aristodimeio was a Local Division (Topiko Diamerisma) within it.

Aristodimeio is named after Aristodemus, one of the three brothers among whom the Peloponnesus was divided during the event the ancient Greeks called the Return of the Heracleidae. His tomb is traditionally located in the area.

Until 1919 it was called Chasampasa or Hasabasa, after Hassan Pasha, who ruled it during the Turkish occupation. It owes its current name to the Ancient Messinian king Aristodemus, whose tomb is probably located there. The house of the Macedonian hero Marinos Lymperopoulos (Captain Kromba), is located in Aristodimeio and has been designated a protected monument.

== Bibliography ==
- Hellenic Interior Ministry (18 March 2001). Δείτε τη Διοικητική Διαίρεση (in Greek). Hellenic Interior Ministry.. The previous Kapodistrias organization of all the communities in Greece. The populations are from the Census of 2001.
