= Macmillan aryballos =

Ancient Greek vase

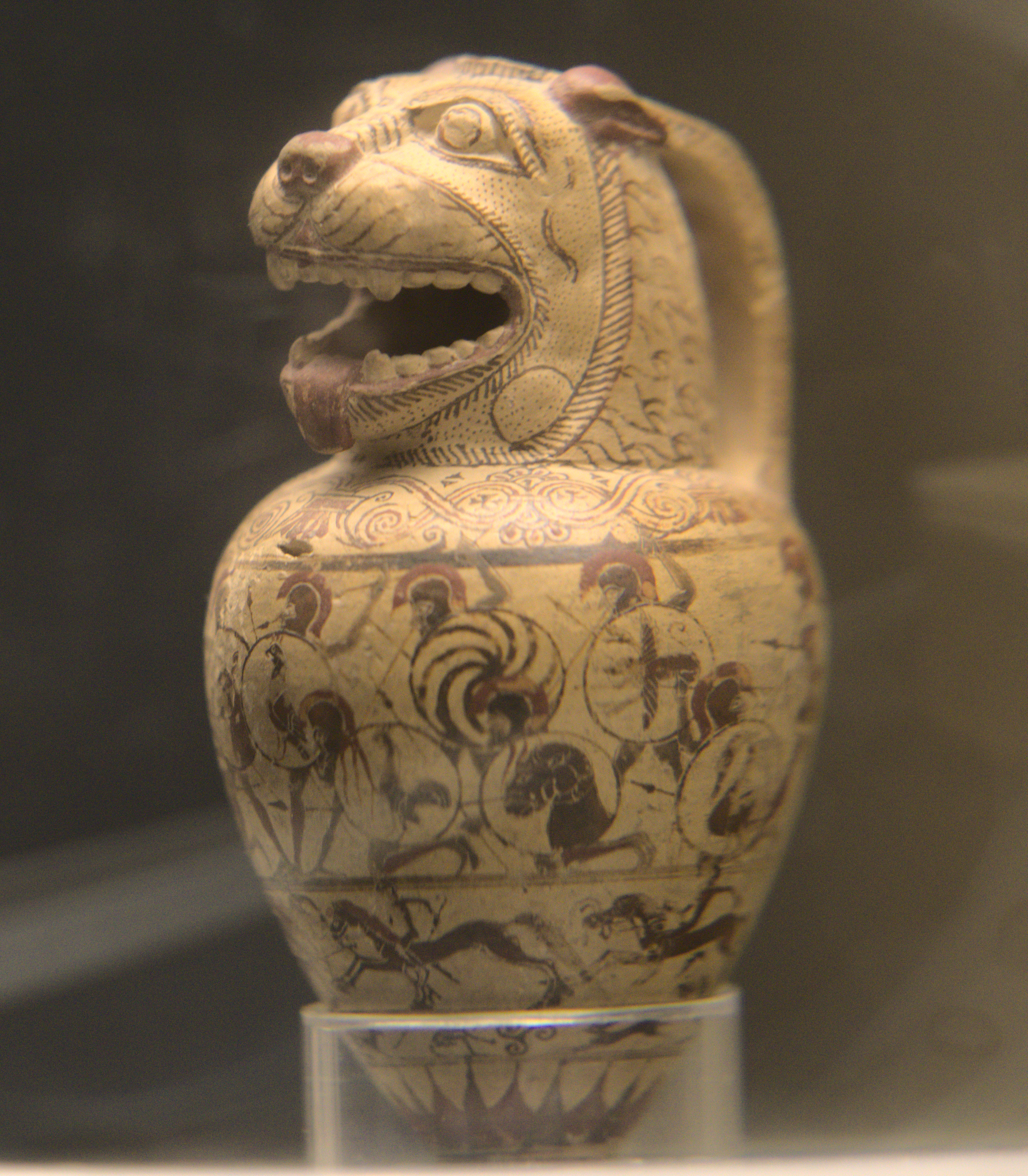
- Material: Clay
- Height: 6.9 cm
- Width: 3.9 cm
- Created: c. 640 BC by the Chigi Painter
- Discovered: before 1890; Greece
- Present location: British Museum, London

The Macmillan aryballos is a Protocorinthian pottery aryballos in the collection of the British Museum. Dating to around 640 BC, it is 6.9 cm high and 3.9 cm in diameter, and weighs 65 grams.

The vase is attributed to the Chigi Painter. (Note: Also known as the Macmillan painter and the Ekphantos painter) Its provenance is uncertain: Cecil Smith reported that it was acquired by Malcolm Macmillan at Thebes, and suggests that it was originally found in a tomb outside the town; but the British Museum Register records it as having been acquired by Macmillan in Corinth. It was gifted to the British Museum by Macmillan in 1889.

The vase is made out of a yellow coloured clay, and painted in shades of brown and purple. Fine details are incised into the clay. The upper part of the vase is in the shape of a lion's head, with the mouth open, tongue hanging out, and teeth displayed. This head appears to have been modelled rather than cast from a mould. A gorgon's face is painted at the top of the handle, where it meets the lion's head. The underside of the foot of the vase is decorated with a rosette.

The vase is painted with a floral chain at the shoulder, three bands of figurative decorations, and rays at the base. The top band is 2 cm high, and painted with a scene of eighteen warriors engaged in combat. This is one of only eight known archaic Greek artworks to depict groups of warriors fighting together. Unlike on the Chigi vase, another work by the same artist, where two phalanxes are depicted, the Macmillan aryballos shows hoplites engaged in single combat. It stretches all the way around the aryballos, and has no clear beginning or end. Each warrior wears a crested helmet and greaves, carries a round shield (each of which is decorated with a different device), and is armed with one or two spears. The army coming from the right-hand side is depicted as victorious; the soldiers coming from the left are defeated. (Note: This arrangement with the victorious army on the right is typical of vases from the Chigi Group; later in the archaic period it was more typical to show the victorious army on the left.) Hans van Wees compares the battle scene on the aryballos to two scene's in Homer's Iliad.

The second band is 1 cm high and depicts a horse race, with six horses galloping from right to left. Beneath one of these horses there is a swan; a crouching figure, possibly an ape, is below another. The third band is 4 mm high and is decorated with a hunting scene, in which a hunter and hounds chase a hare and a fox or jackal. Jeffrey Hurwit interprets the three scenes as depicting different stages in a man's life: the hunting scene for boyhood, the racing for young men, and the battle scene for fully adult men.

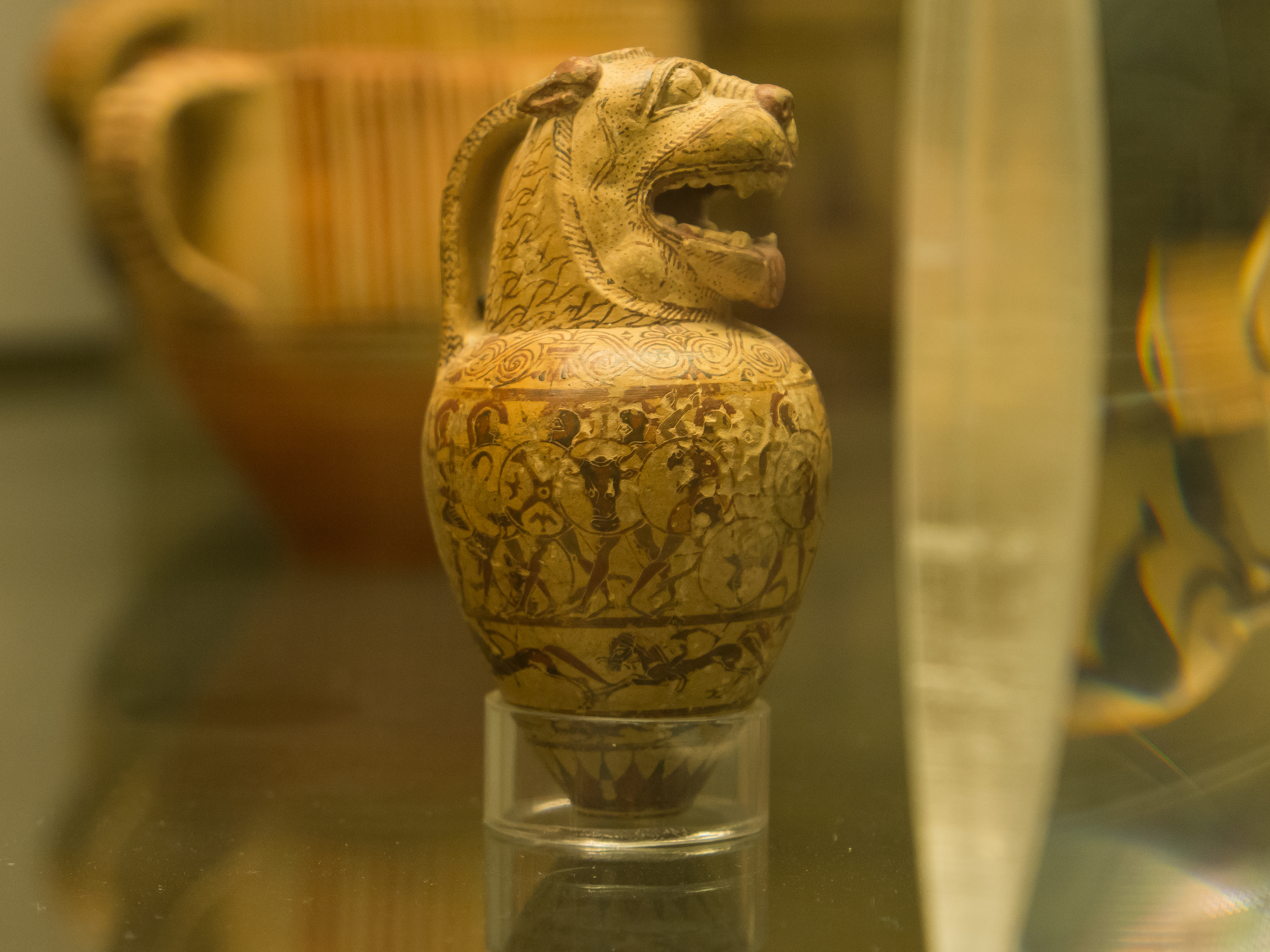
Macmillan aryballos on display in the British Museum

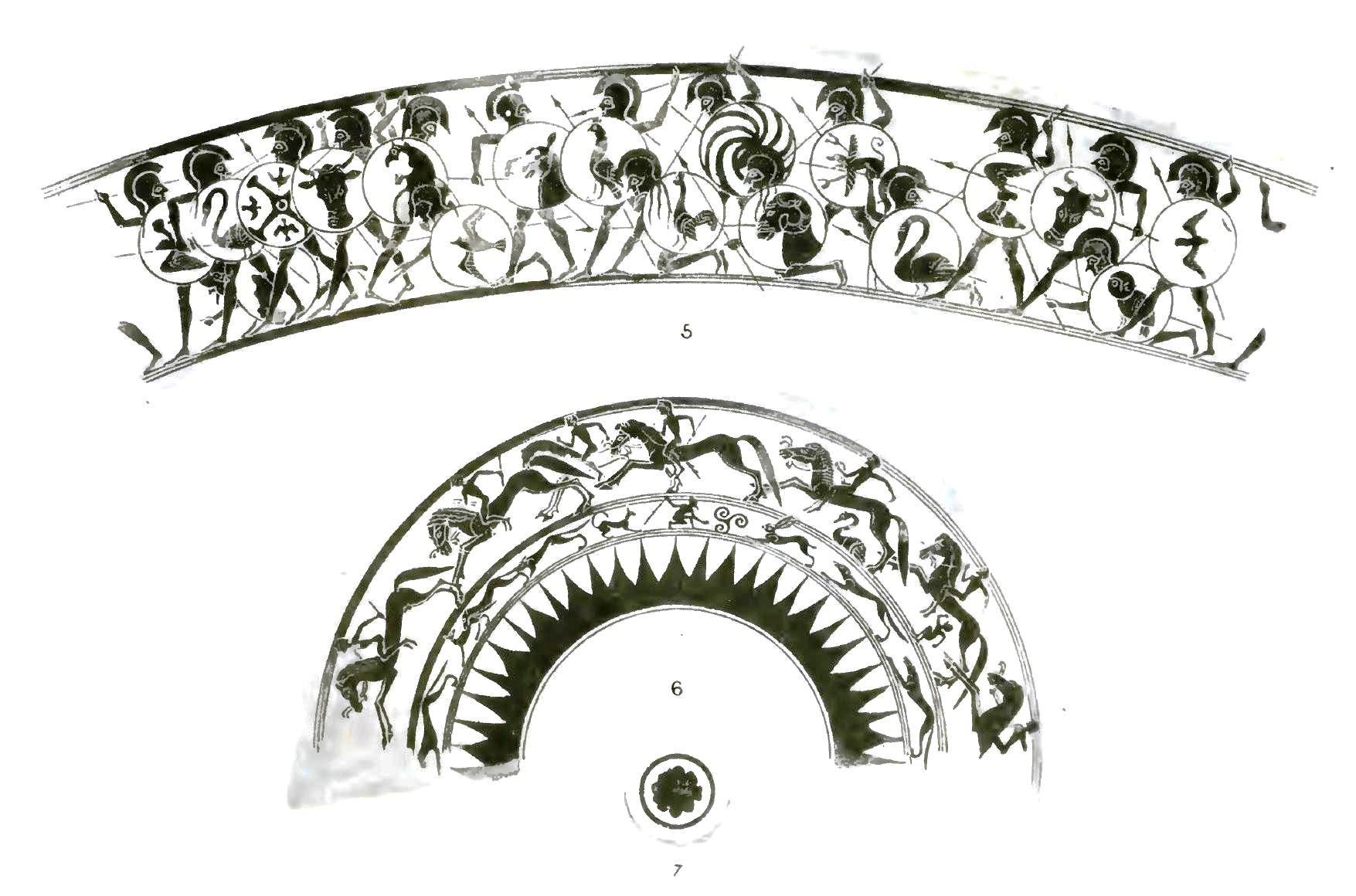
Diagram of the decoration of the Macmillan aryballos

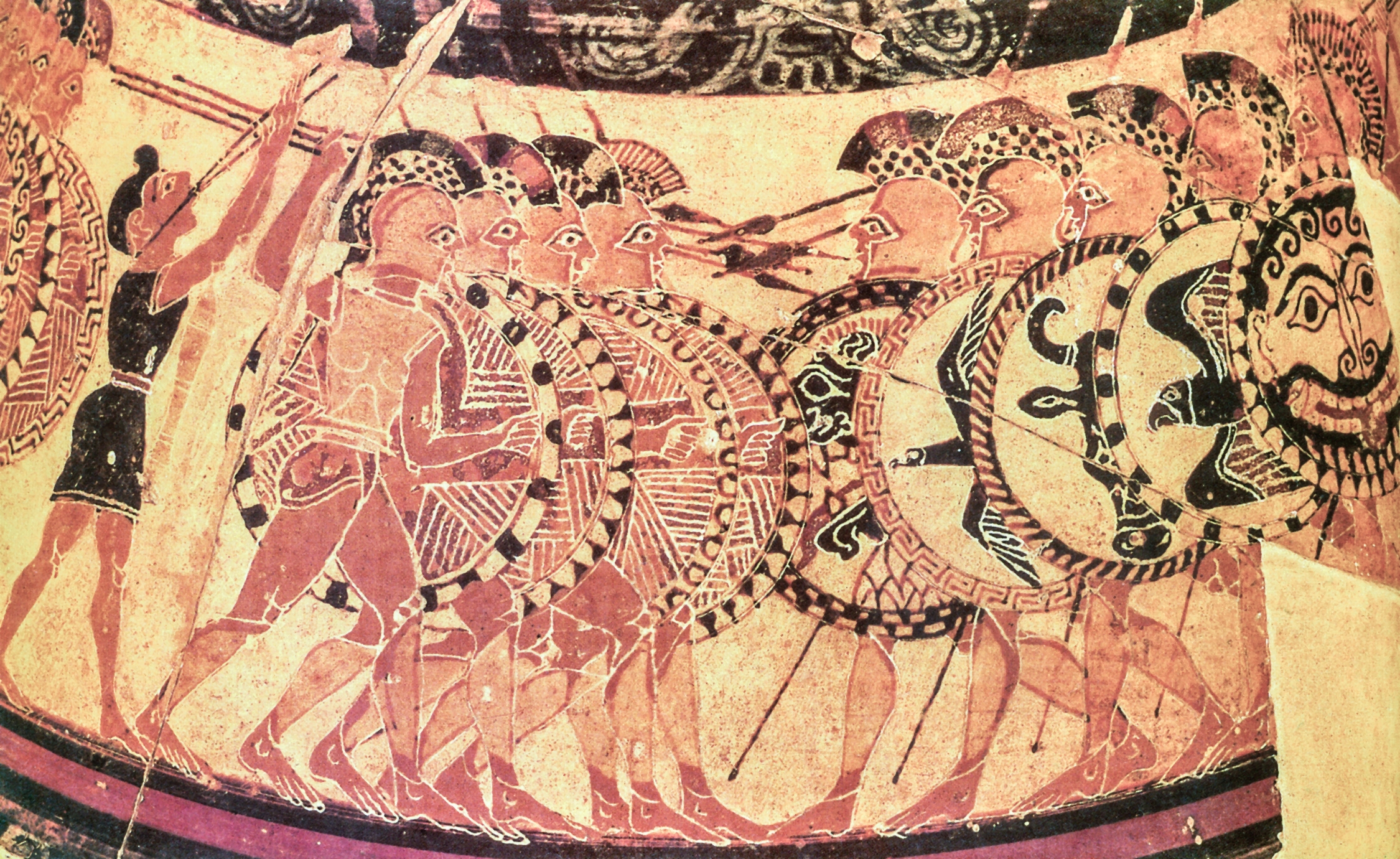
Detail of the Chigi Vase, another vase by the same artist depicting warriors in battle

== Works cited ==
- Amyx, D. A. (1988a). Corinthian Vase Painting of the Archaic Period. Vol. 1. Berkeley: University of California Press.
- Amyx, D. A. (1988b). Corinthian Vase Painting of the Archaic Period. Vol. 2. Berkeley: University of California Press.
- Arafat, K. W. (2015). "The Chigi Painter at Isthmia?". Hesperia Supplements. 48: 119–132. JSTOR 24637426.
- "British Museum Collection Online: The Macmillan Aryballos". British Museum.
- Hurwit, Jeffrey (2002). "Reading the Chigi Vase". Hesperia. 71 (1): 1–22. doi:10.2307/3182058. JSTOR 3182058.
- Salmon, John (1977). "Political Hoplites?". Journal of Hellenic Studies. 97: 84–101. doi:10.2307/631024. JSTOR 631024.
- Schwartz, Adam (2002). "Order or Disarray?". Classica et Mediaevalia. 53.
- Smith, Cecil (1889). "Acquisitions of British Museum". Classical Review. 3 (4).
- Smith, Cecil (1890). "A Protokorinthian Lekythos in the British Museum". Journal of Hellenic Studies. 11.
- van Wees, Hans (2000). "The Development of the Hoplite Phalanx: Iconography and Reality in the Seventh Century BC". In van Wees, Hans (ed.). War and Violence in the Ancient Greek World. London: Duckworth. ISBN 0-7156-30466.
- Varto, Emily K. (2023). "Bodyguards and the Connecting Ideology of Early Greek Warfare". In Hebblewhite, Mark; Whately, Conor (eds.). Brill's Companion to Bodyguards in the Ancient Mediterranean. Leiden: Brill. ISBN 978-90-04-52768-3.
