= Arsinoi =

Arsinoi Αρσινόη
- Community
- Location within Greece
- Coordinates: 37°10′N 21°55′E
- Country: Greece
- Administrative region: Peloponnese
- Regional unit: Messenia
- Municipality: Messini
- Municipal unit: Ithomi
- Elevation: 330 m (1,080 ft)

Population (2021)
  - Community: 114
- Time zone: UTC+2 (EET)
  - Summer (DST): UTC+3 (EEST)
- Postal code: 240 02

Arsinoi (Greek: Αρσινόη) is a local community (topiki koinotita) of the municipal unit (dimotiki enotita) Ithomi, of the municipality (dimos) of Messini within the regional unit (perifereiaki enotita) of Messenia in the region (perifereia) of Peloponnese, one of 13 regions into which Greece has been divided. Before 2011 it held the same position in the administrative hierarchy, according to Law 2539 of 1997, the Kapodistrias Plan, except that Ithomi was an independent deme and Arsinoi was a local division (topiko diamerisma) within it.

== Bibliography ==
- Hellenic Interior Ministry (18 March 2001). Δείτε τη Διοικητική Διαίρεση (in Greek). Hellenic Interior Ministry.. The previous Kapodistrias organization of all the communities in Greece. The populations are from the Census of 2001.
