= Polychares of Messenia =

Polychares of Messenia (Ancient Greek: Πολυχάρης) was an athlete from Messenia who won the stadion race in the fourth Ancient Olympic Games in 764 BC. The stadion race (about 180 meters) was the only competition in the first 13 Olympiads.

According to Pausanias, he was involved with the outbreak of the First Messenian War after a Spartan stole his property and killed his son. When the Spartan kings refused to punish the culprit, he decided to take revenge himself, thus triggering the war that had been long-awaited by both sides.
