= Stenyclarus =

Stenyclarus or Stenyklaros (Ancient Greek: Στενύκλαρος), or Stenyclerus or Stenykleros (Στενύκληρος), was a town in the north of ancient Messenia, and the capital of the Dorian conquerors, built by Cresphontes. Andania had been the ancient capital of the country. The town afterwards ceased to exist, but its name was given to the northern of the two Messenian plains and site of a battle where Messenians defeated a small Spartan army.
