= Aristomenes (actor) =

Aristomenes (Ancient Greek: Ἀριστομένης) was an actor of the Attic old comedy, who lived in the 2nd century AD during the reign of – and was a freed-man of – the Roman emperor Hadrian, who used to call him "Attic Partridge" (Ἀττικοπέρδιξ).

He was a native of Athens, and is also mentioned as the author of a work "On the Priesthood" (πρὸς τὰς ἱερουργίας), the third book of which is quoted by Athenaeus. He is perhaps the same Aristomenes as the one mentioned by the Scholiast on Apollonius of Rhodes.
