= Aristomenes =

King of Messenia

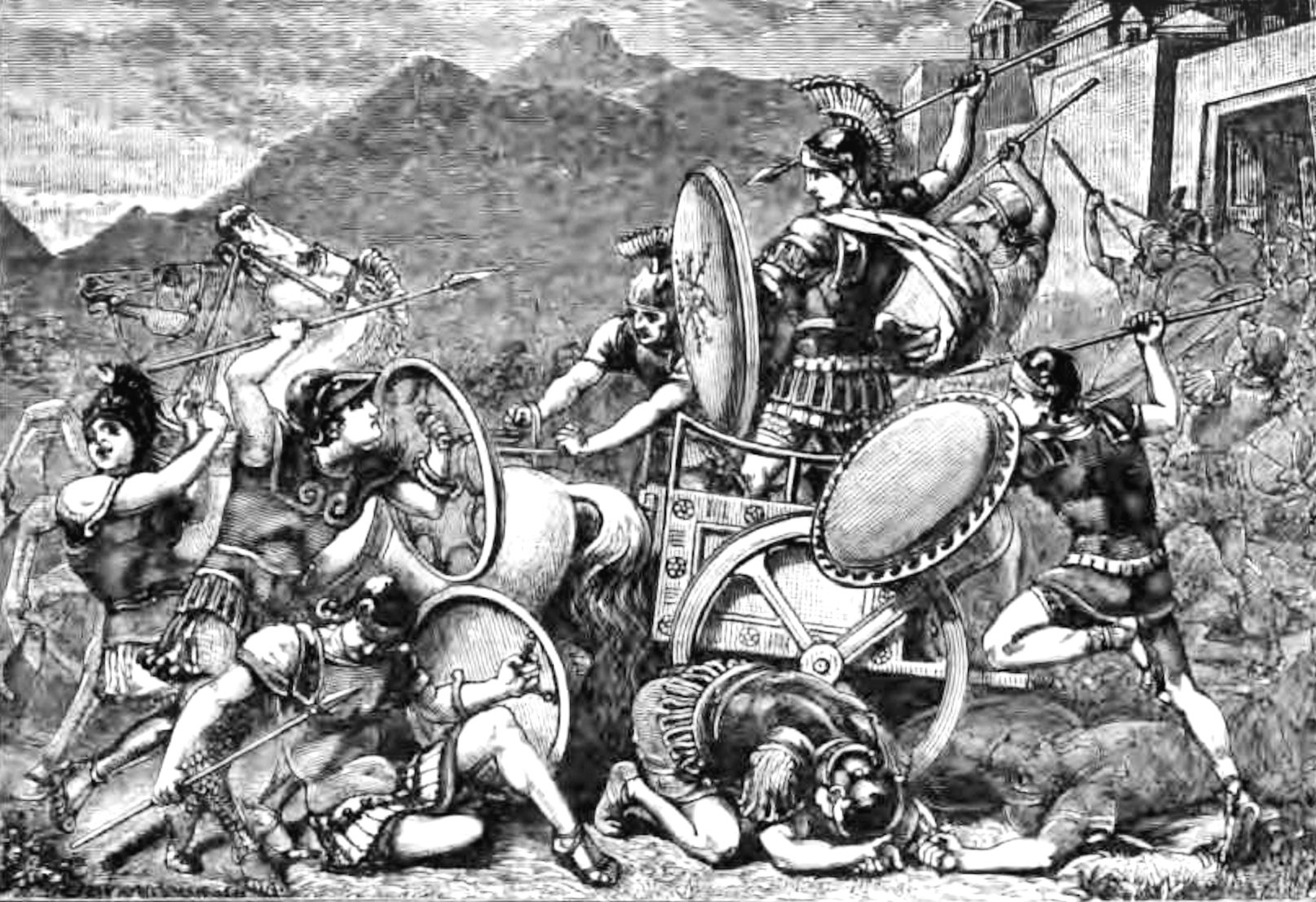
Aristomenes fighting his way out of Eira.

Aristomenes (Ancient Greek: Ἀριστομένης) was a king of Messenia, celebrated for his struggle with the Spartans in the Second Messenian War (685–668 BC), and his resistance to them on Mount Eira for 11 years. At length the mountain fell to the enemy, while he escaped and, according to legend, was snatched up by the gods; in fact he died at Rhodes.

== Life ==
Aristomenes was a member of the Aepytid family, the son of Nicomedes (or, according to another version, of Pyrrhus) and Nicoteleia, and took a prominent part in stirring up the revolt against Sparta and securing the co-operation of Argos and Arcadia. He showed such heroism in the first encounter, at Derae, that the crown was offered to him, but he would accept only the title of commander-in-chief. His daring is illustrated by the story that he came by night to the temple of Athene "of the Brazen House" at Sparta, and there set up his shield with the inscription "Dedicated to the goddess by Aristomenes from the Spartans."

His prowess contributed largely to the Messenian victory over the Spartan and Corinthian forces at "The Boar's Barrow" in the plain of Stenyclarus, but in the following year the treachery of the Arcadian king Aristocrates caused the Messenians to suffer a crushing defeat at the Battle of the Great Foss. Aristomenes and the survivors retired to the mountain stronghold of Eira, where they defied the Spartans for eleven years. On one of his raids he and fifty of his companions were captured and thrown into the Caeadas, the chasm on Mount Taygetus into which criminals were cast. Aristomenes alone was saved, and soon reappeared at Eira: legend told how he was upheld in his fall by an eagle and escaped by grasping the tail of a fox, which led him to the hole by which it had entered.

On another occasion he was captured during a truce by some Cretan auxiliaries of the Spartans, and was released only by the devotion of a Messenian girl who afterwards became his daughter-in-law. At length Eira was betrayed to the Spartans (668 BC according to Pausanias), and after a heroic resistance Aristomenes and his followers had to evacuate Messenia and seek a temporary refuge with their Arcadian allies. A desperate plan to seize Sparta itself was foiled by Aristocrates, who paid with his life for his treachery. Aristomenes retired to Ialysus on Rhodes, where Damagetus, his son-in-law, was king, and died there while planning a journey to Sardis and Ecbatana to seek aid from the Lydian and Median sovereigns.

== Other narratives ==
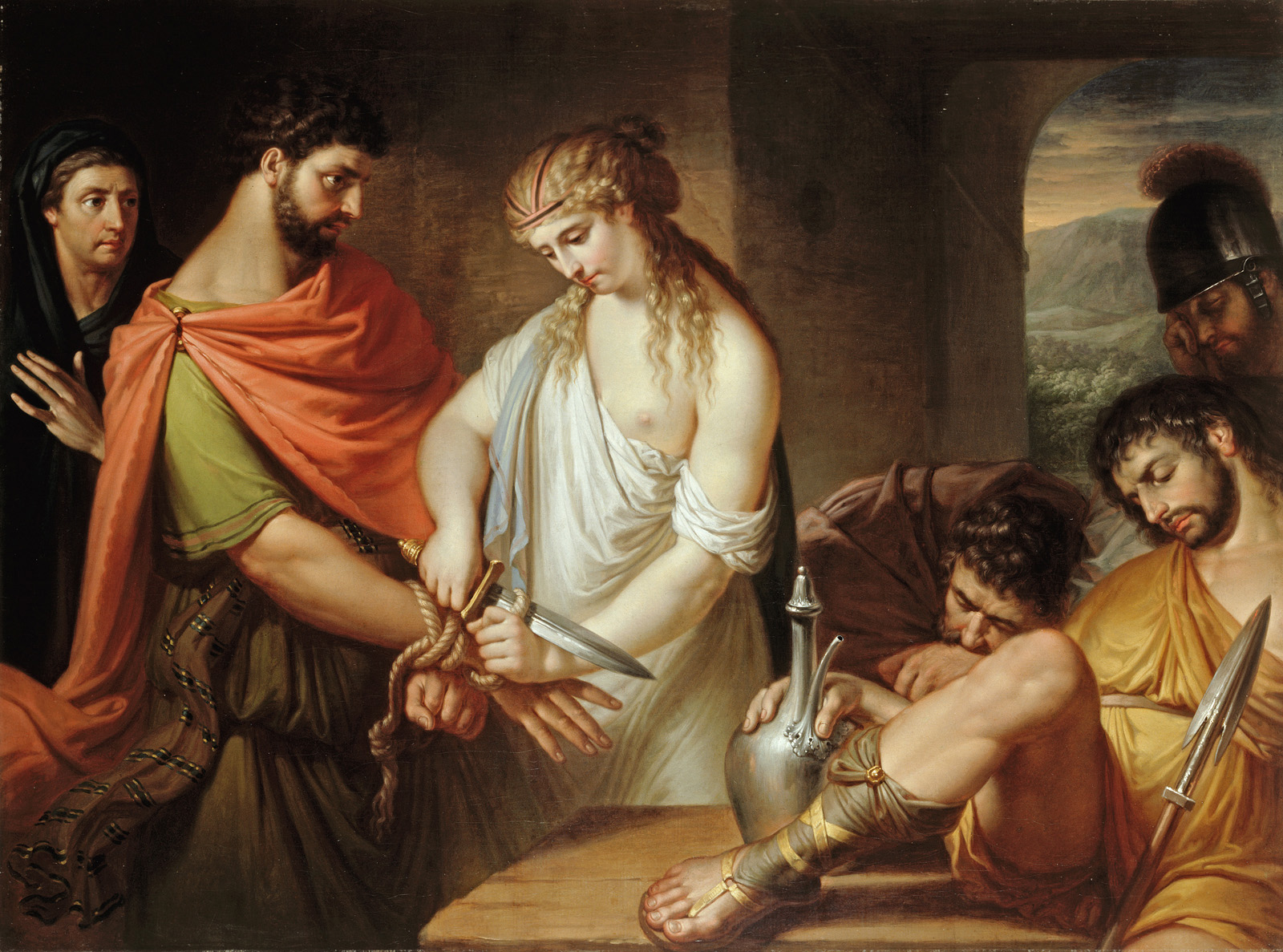
A girl saves Aristomenes by Franc Kavčič

Another tradition represents him as captured and slain by the Spartans during the war. Though there seems to be no conclusive reason for doubting the existence of Aristomenes, his history, as related by Pausanias, following mainly the Messeniaca of the Cretan epic poet Rhianus (about 230 BC), is evidently largely interwoven with fictions. These probably arose after the foundation of Messene in 369 BC. Aristomenes's statue was set up in the stadium there: his bones were fetched from Rhodes and placed in a tomb surmounted by a column, and more than five centuries later heroic honours were still paid to him, and his exploits were a popular subject of song.

According to explorer Richard Francis Burton, one story about Aristomenes, in which he had been thrown into a pit and had to escape—being set free by Archidameia—is the principal inspiration for one of the voyages of Sinbad the Sailor in the Arabian Nights.

== In literature ==
Aristomenes is the hero of Messene Redeemed (1940), a verse drama by F. L. Lucas, based on Pausanias, about Messenian history.
