= Ithomi, Messenia =

Ithomi Ιθώμη
- Municipal unit
- Location within the regional unit

- Location within Greece
- Coordinates: 37°09′N 21°58′E
- Country: Greece
- Administrative region: Peloponnese
- Regional unit: Messenia
- Municipality: Messini

Area
  - Municipal unit: 90.428 km^{2} (34.914 sq mi)

Population (2021)
  - Municipal unit: 1,537
  - Municipal unit density: 17.00/km^{2} (44.02/sq mi)
- Time zone: UTC+2 (EET)
  - Summer (DST): UTC+3 (EEST)
- Vehicle registration: ΚΜ

Ithomi (Greek: Ιθώμη) is a municipal unit (dimotiki enotita) of the municipality (dimos) of Messini within the regional unit (perifereiaki enotita) of Messenia in the region (perifereia) of Peloponnese, one of 13 regions into which Greece has been divided. Before 2011 the same hierarchy prevailed, according to Law 2539 of 1997, the Kapodistrias Plan, except that Messenia was a nomos and Ithomi a demos, with seat in Valyra. The lowest-level units were the same with the same populations in either system but where before 2010 they were Local Divisions, after it they were Local Communities. The municipal unit has an area of 90.428 km^{2}.

Ithomi is named after Mount Ithome.

== Communities of Ithomi ==
The Demotike Enoteta of Ithomi contains the same subdivisions and populations as did the previous deme of Ithomi but the subdivisions are now Topikes Koinetetes (local communities). These are as follows:

Local community	Population (2021)
Aristodimeio	236
Arsinoi	114
Valyra	694
Zerbisia	67
Kefalinos	89
Lampaina	118
Archaia Messini	181
Revmatia	38

== Geography ==
The Municipal Unit of Ithomi does not include a community named Ithomi but is named after Mt. Ithome, the central geographic feature visible everywhere in the territory. The latter extends from west of the mountain through the valley to the east to and including the Mavrouzumena River, a tributary of the Pamisos River. The confluence is on the east of Aristodimio. North of there the Pamisos is totally controlled, running between straight dikes. It is not shown on many maps; instead the Mavrouzumena is portrayed as the upper Pamisos. The communities are small. The land is given mainly to agriculture, arboriculture and viticulture. The Mavrouzumena flows from north of Ithome more or less in its natural configuration, except that it is dammed just below Valira.

By far the largest community is Valira, the former seat of the former deme. As the name is not unique and is not uniquely Greek some maps label it Valira-Ithome. However, the only community ever called Ithome in the territory was what is now Archaia Messene, the ruins of a large ancient city, which early in its ancient existence was called Ithome. A somewhat larger territory around it was Messana. The village of Mavromati is located within the ancient walls. Its population constitutes the population of Archaia Messene.

== Municipal history ==
The concept of a dēmos, plural dēmoi, (English deme) or municipality, originated in ancient Greece as a geographic unit of the people. Demes appear in the Iliad; they were not just units of Athens, famous for its ancient demo-cracy. The word can mean either the people or the geographic unit. The municipal structure always follows the settlement pattern often with some degree of lag. Periodically it needs to be updated. A given structure becomes part of the constitutional structure of government. The structures of ancient Greece yielded to the Roman when Greece (Achaea) became a Roman province and to the Byzantine when the former Eastern Roman Empire became the Byzantine Empire. Leo the Philosopher, a Byzantine emperor, declared the Roman structure abolished in the 9th century.

The archaeological concept that the grand city of Messene was constituted as a magnificent but isolated antique show by Epaminondas, never to be altered or of much practical use thereafter, and remaining today just as it was, is more mythical than not. Epaminondas reconstituted the quasi-independent city-state of Messenia with capital city at Messene. Messene remained the capital for several hundred years until the Byzantine Empire moved the seat of Messenia east of Mt. Ithome. The city was built so well that there was no need to reconstruct its fortifications, though they must have been repaired many times. Many alterations occurred within the walls. The ruins portrayed as those of Epaminondas' city were in fact accumulated over the centuries. One might suppose that the residences were remodelled and rebuilt many times over the same city plan.

== Bibliography ==
- Hellenic Interior Ministry (18 March 2001). Δείτε τη Διοικητική Διαίρεση (in Greek). Hellenic Interior Ministry.. The previous Kapodistrias organization of all the communities in Greece. The populations are from the Census of 2001.
