= Ithome =

Mountain in Messenia, Greece

Ithome, Ithomi
- Ἰθώμη
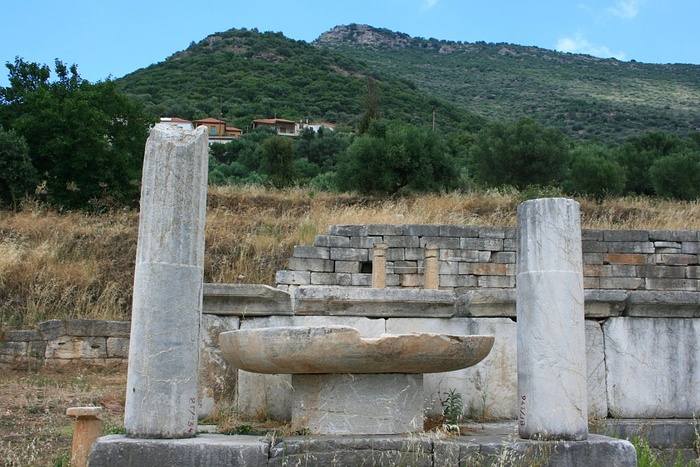
- The twin peaks, Eva in the fore, Ithome in the rear. The view is from the southeast side of Eva looking at the New Monastery in the foreground. Most of the ruins are on the other side.

Highest point
- Elevation: 800 m (2,600 ft)
- Prominence: 760 m (2,490 ft)
- Coordinates: 37°11′10″N 21°55′30″E

Geography
- Location within Greece
- Location: Messenia, Greece

Geology
- Mountain type: limestone karst

Climbing
- Easiest route: Zig-zag ancient dirt road on the southeast corner

Mount Ithome (Greek: Ἰθώμη) or Ithomi, previously Vourkano(s) (Greek: Βουρκάνο(ς)) or Voulcano(s) (Greek: Βουλκάνο(ς)), is the northernmost of twin peaks in Messenia, Greece. Mount Ithome rises to about 800 metres (2,600 feet), about 760 metres (2,490 feet) over Valyra, the seat of Ithomi, the former municipality. The other peak is Mount Eva (Greek: Εύα), 700 metres (2,300 feet), connected to Mount Ithomi by a thin ridge 0.80 kilometres (0.50 miles) long.

Mount Ithome is 25 kilometres (16 miles) north of Kalamata on the Gulf of Messenia, 60 kilometres (37 miles) east of Pylos, seat of Bronze Age Messenia, and 20 kilometres (12 miles) north of Messini, modern namesake of ancient Messene, nestled under the cliffs of Mount Ithome. From the top the whole valley of the Pamisos river can be viewed eastward to Mount Taygetus and southward to the Gulf of Messenia. The site is highly defensible and yet off the main road; in this case, the Kalamata-Pylos road.

== Etymology ==
=== Ithome ===
Like most ancient names the etymology of Ithome is not certain. It is also the name of a town in Thessaly, although Reece notes evidence that the one in Thessaly was originally called Thome.

=== Vurkano ===
The pre-independence name Vurcano has had many variants: Vourkano, Voulkanos, Vulcano, Voucano, Boulcano, Dorkano, Voulkani, etc. One of the earliest records of a place called Bulcano is The Domains and Fiefs of the Principality of Achaia, composed for Marie of Bourbon, 1364. The Grand Seneschal of the Kingdom of Naples, Niccolo Acciajuoli, is said to possess Lo Castello de Bulcano (Messene) as a fief. The monastery on top, which dates to no later than the reign of the Byzantine emperor, Andronikos II Paleologus, 1282–1328, was probably known as Vurkano even then. The Archaeological Museum of Messenia dates the name Vourkano to the 10th century.

=== Mavromati ===
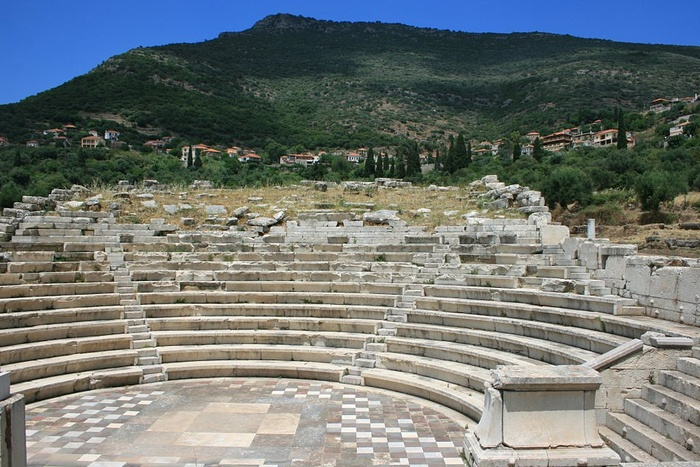
View of Mavromati from the classical ruins below.

Mavromati is segmented mavr-oma-ti, "place of the black eye" from mavros, "dark," and omma, "eye," or ommation, "small eye," a common name for springs.

== Geography ==
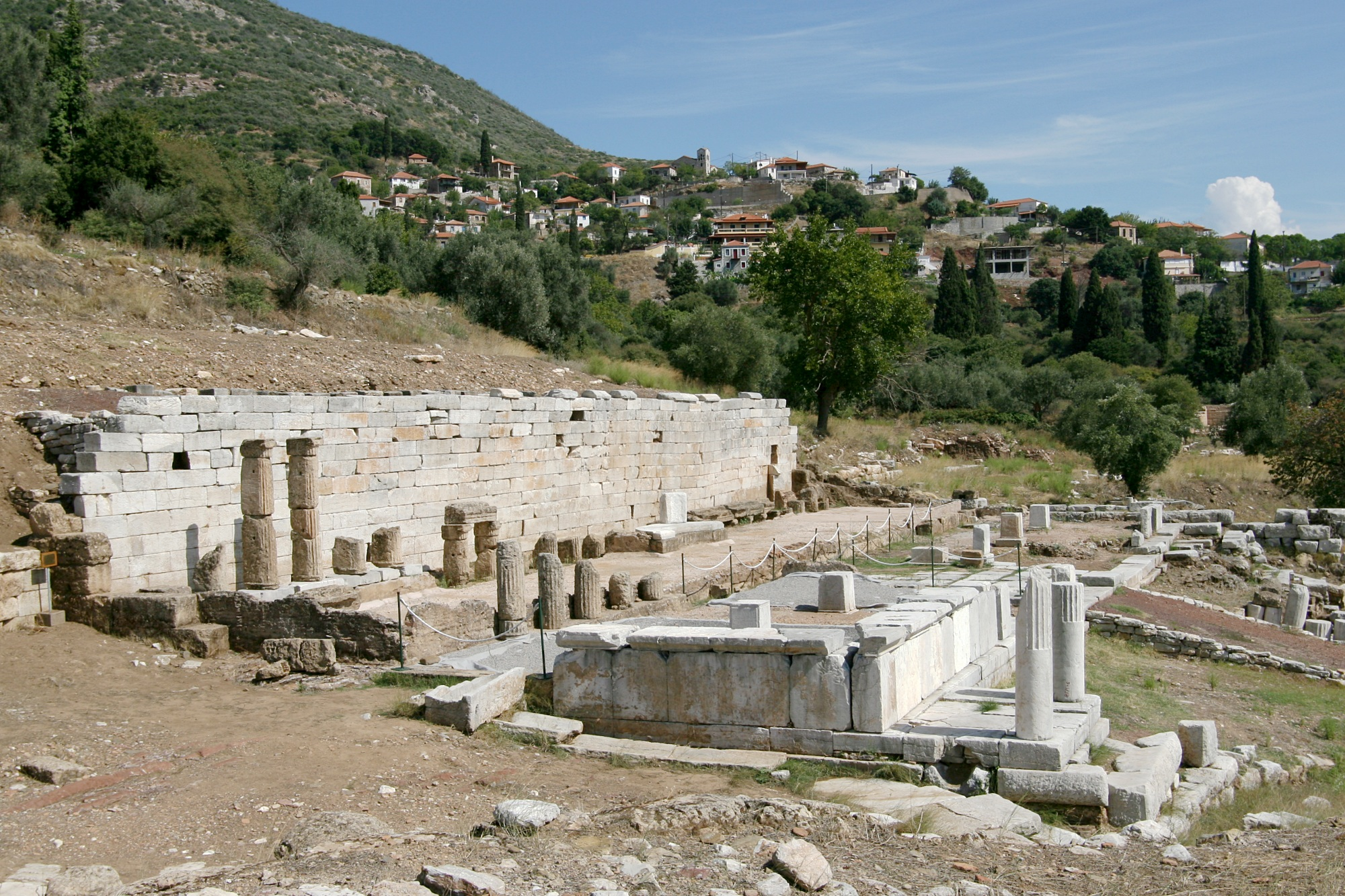
The klepsydra, or spring catchment, in Mavromati. Messene was downslope. Ithome looms in the background.

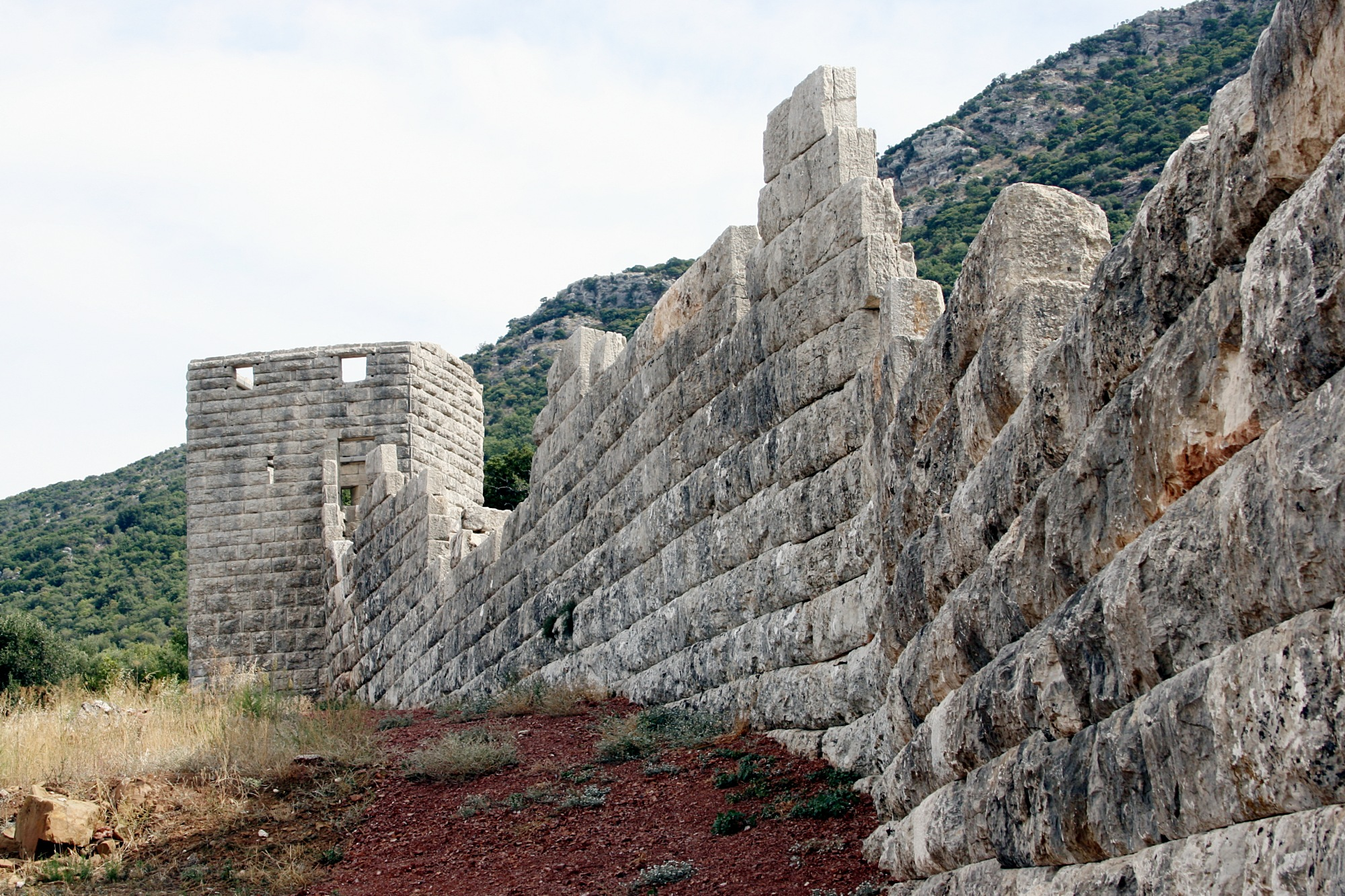
The walls of Messene against a backdrop of Mount Ithome.

The Homeric village of Ithome was probably on the summit, which is flat. In the Bronze Age, a temple dedicated to Zeus Ithomatas (Zeus of Ithome) existed there. It was torn down and rebuilt as a Christian church and monastery no later than the early 14th century from the same stone. In the 17th century this monastery of Panagia Voulkanou, or Moni Voulkanou, was closed, except for a caretaker, to become known as the Old Monastery. The new monastery was constructed on the lower east slope of Eva. It was a staging point in the Greek War of Independence and also houses a noted library containing ancient manuscripts.

Ithomaea (Ancient Greek: ἰθώμαια), was an annual festival celebrated at Ithome, in honour of Zeus Ithomatas and originally a musical contest was held.

The classical town of Ithome was on the lower west flank of Mount Ithome, which forms a bowl in the side of the mountain. The location was selected as the site for the city of Messene (not the same as the modern city of Messini) when it was rebuilt by Epaminondas in 369 BC. Excavations there in recent decades have uncovered evidence of a settlement going back to the Stone Age. The location of Messene is marked by massive city walls that include the east side of the ridge, where they protect the ancient zig-zagging road to the summit, the top of the ridge, a wide area around the bowl and end against the mountain on the north, an approximately rectangular circuit. The mountain itself protects the east side. These defenses were probably restored, rather than constructed anew, by Epaminondas.

Within the lower part of this wide circuit are the ruins of the ancient city. About 300 metres (980 feet) up the slope is the modern village of Mavromati, occupying a small portion of the ancient city. It is a subdivision of the municipality of Messene. Mavromati is built around the key feature of the city, one which made its large size possible, a large surface spring flowing out of the mountain through a hole in the rocks. A klepsydra, or "spring catchment," has been maintained as a village watering place. That is it is ancient is shown by the ancient system of channels constructed from it to the ancient urban area below. Mavromati is at 419 metres (1,375 feet), thus Messene was essentially at 119 metres (390 feet) and Mount Ithome loomed at 681 metres (2,234 feet) over it.

As the most defensible point in the surrounding territory, Ithome was the center of Messenian resistance to Sparta during the Messenian Wars in the 7th and 6th centuries BC. Ithome was also the center of the Helot revolt in 465 BC after an earthquake in Sparta, which became known as the Third Messenian War.

== See also ==
- Ithomi
- Messene
- Messenia
