= Valyra =

Valyra Βαλύρα
- Community
- Location within Greece
- Coordinates: 37°09′N 21°58′E
- Country: Greece
- Administrative region: Peloponnese
- Regional unit: Messenia
- Municipality: Messini
- Municipal unit: Ithomi
- Elevation: 30 m (98 ft)

Population (2021)
  - Community: 694
- Time zone: UTC+2 (EET)
  - Summer (DST): UTC+3 (EEST)
- Postal code: 240 02
- Area code: 27240
- Vehicle registration: KM
- Website: www.e-valira.gr

Valyra (Greek: Βαλύρα pronounced Valira) is a small village in southern Greece. Situated on the Peloponnese Peninsula, Valyra was the seat of the Ithomi municipality. Located near the ancient city of Messene, it lies 18 km NW of Kalamata, and about 177 km SW of Athens.
