= Second Messenian War =

War between Messenia and Sparta in Archaic Greece

Date	c. 660–650 BC
Location	Peloponnese
Result	Spartan victory
Territorial changes	Messenia remains under Spartan control

Belligerents
Messenia; Arcadia; Sicyon; Elis; Argos	Sparta; Corinth; Lepreum; Cretan mercenaries

Commanders and leaders
Aristomenes; Androcles; Fidas; Aristocrates II	Anaxander; Anaxidamus; Tyrtaeus; Emperamus

The Second Messenian War was a war which occurred c. 660–650 BC between the ancient Greek states of Messenia and Sparta, with localized resistance possibly lasting until the end of the century. It started around 40 years after the end of the First Messenian War with a slave rebellion. Other scholars, however, assign earlier dates, claiming, for example, that 668 BC is the date of the war's start, pointing at Sparta's defeat at the First Battle of Hysiae as a possible catalyst for the uprising. Current events concerning this war are stated, too.

== Prelude ==
The First Messenian War lasted from 743 BC to 724 BC. During the period prior to conquest, Sparta dealt with overpopulation in the Laconia region by assimilating other Laconians as perioeci ('those who live around us'). In an effort to further expand their territory in the Peloponnese, the Spartan Army went to war with the Messenians. As a result of two decades' struggle, the Messenian people became enslaved as helots and made serfs of the state, following Spartan victory in the southwestern region of the Peloponnese. Furthermore, it was said that the first battle was initiated because some Messenian men carried off some Spartan women praying at a temple. When the Messenians refused to return them, the Spartans invaded Messenia.

== War ==
The Second Messenian War was the result of revolt by the helot population of Messenia, supported with the aid of the Argives and the Arcadians. In an attempt to regain freedom, the Messenians invaded Laconia. The first battle, the Battle of Deres, happened before the allies arrived. Aristomenes fought so well that he was made the new king of Messenia by his people. He followed this up by crossing into Sparta and placed a shield in the temple of Athena in order to scare the Spartans. This forced the Spartans to send to Delphi where they were told to gain a leader from Athens. Upon doing so the Spartans marched on the Messenians at Boar's Grave where they met Aristomenes and his troops, who defeated them.

However, it was Sparta who had the upper hand in the Battle of the Great Foss when they bribed Aristocrates, king of Messenia-allied Arcadia, into retreating through the Messenian lines when the Spartans advanced into battle. Again, this loss forced the Messenians into a fortified city at Mt. Eira (Ira). It was, while fortified here, that the Messenians started to use the land as enemy territory and several raids were made of the surrounding towns, some even led by Aristomenes himself.

During this time Aristomenes was captured. Before he could be executed he escaped his holding and made it back to Eira. The Messenians held Eira for over ten years before the Spartans made their last attack. Before Eira fell, however, the Spartans allowed the women and children to be released along with Aristomenes. The ones who did not escape Eira were again turned into helots and most of the ones who escaped fled to Italy. Aristomenes himself left for Rhodes where he died and was honored as a hero.

Ultimately, the Spartans were able to quell the revolts following the death of the Argive commander, and further suppressed the Messenians back to a helot status. As a result of this war, Spartan society became a strong militaristic power in the Mediterranean in order to control the masses along the Peloponnese and to prevent further rebellions brought on by the helots, who later did manage to break away from Spartan rule in 371 BC with Theban aid.

== In literature ==
F. L. Lucas's Messene Redeemed (1940) is a verse drama, based on Pausanias, about Messenian history, including episodes from the Second Messenian War.

== Sources ==
- Pausanias (geographer)
- Diodorus Siculus
- Tyrtaeus
