= Messene =

Ancient Messene Αρχαία Μεσσήνη
- Community
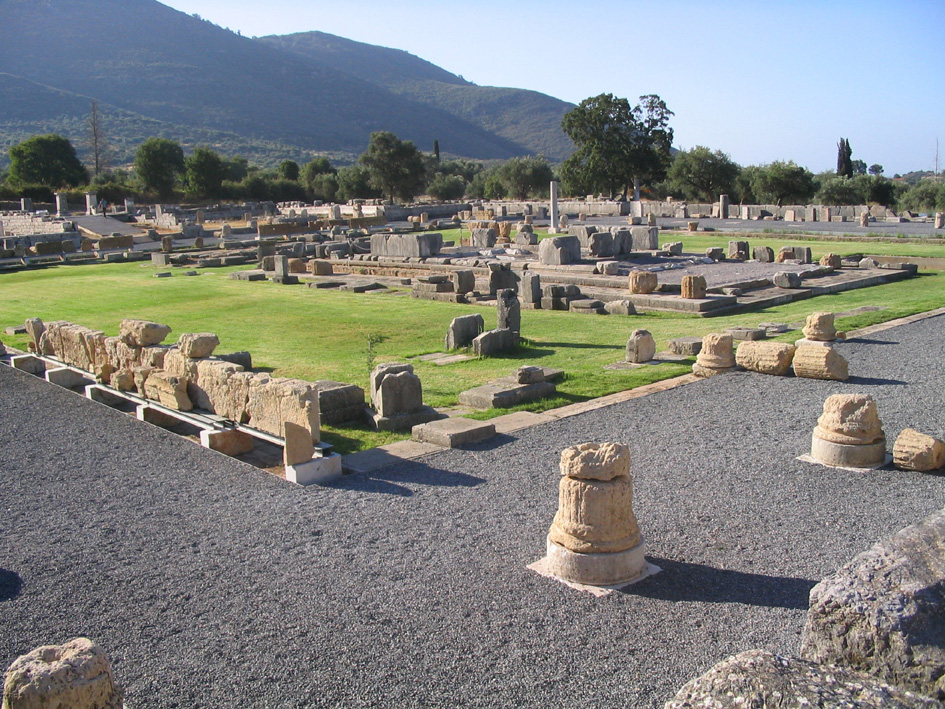
- View of the ancient Asclepeion.

- Location within Greece
- Coordinates: 37°10.5′N 21°55.2′E
- Country: Greece
- Administrative region: Peloponnese
- Regional unit: Messenia
- Municipality: Messini
- Municipal unit: Ithomi
- Elevation: 402 m (1,319 ft)

Population (2021)
  - Community: 181
- Time zone: UTC+2 (EET)
  - Summer (DST): UTC+3 (EEST)
- Postal code: 240 02

Messene (Greek: Μεσσήνη, ancient gr. /Messēnē/, modern gr. /Messini/, mycenaean greek: 𐀕𐀼𐀙 me-za-na /Mezānā/), officially Ancient Messene, is a local community within the regional unit (perifereiaki enotita) of Messenia in the region (perifereia) of Peloponnese.

It is best known for the ruins of the large classical city-state of Ancient Messene. The site was founded in the Bronze Age as Ithome, an ancient city originally of Achaean Greeks which eventually came under the hegemony of the military state of Sparta with which it had a long struggle. During the latter period many inhabitants went into exile, and eventually it was destroyed by the Spartans and abandoned for some time.

After the defeat of the Spartans at the Battle of Leuctra (371 BC), the Thebans invaded the Peloponnese and Epaminondas built the new city of Messene on the site in 369 BC over the ruins of Ithome and invited the return of the previous inhabitants and their descendants.

The substantial ruins are a major historical attraction. Much has been archaeologically excavated and partly restored or preserved for study and public viewing, as well as for various events. The most substantial restored remains date from the Hellenistic and Roman times.

The city of Messene flourished also in the postclassical times and a settlement at the site continued until modern times. Late Roman Messene suffered much after the major AD 365 Crete earthquake that hit hard also the entire SW Peloponnese. From the beginning of the 5th century AD Messene is being reconstructed as a Christian city and the seat of a local bishop. It will be in the so called Byzantine "Dark-Ages" during the 7th and 8th centuries that the city once again experienced a deep crisis with the settlement of new populations in the region, probably of Slavic origin. In Middle Byzantine times, after the 10th century, the now called village or township of Voulcano experiences new growth with rich material remains. The village of Voulcano/Messene continues through the Late Medieval/Frankish and Ottoman periods until Early Modern times when the village changes name again into Mavromati, that still occupies what was the upper city around the ancient fountain identified as Klepsydra.

== Geography ==
Archaia Messene is located 25 kilometres (16 miles) north of Kalamata and 60 kilometres (37 miles) east of Pylos.

== Archaeology ==
Excavation of the site began on April 10, 1829, with the French scientific commission of the Morea Expedition, under the direction of Guillaume-Abel Blouet, at the end of the Greek War of Independence.

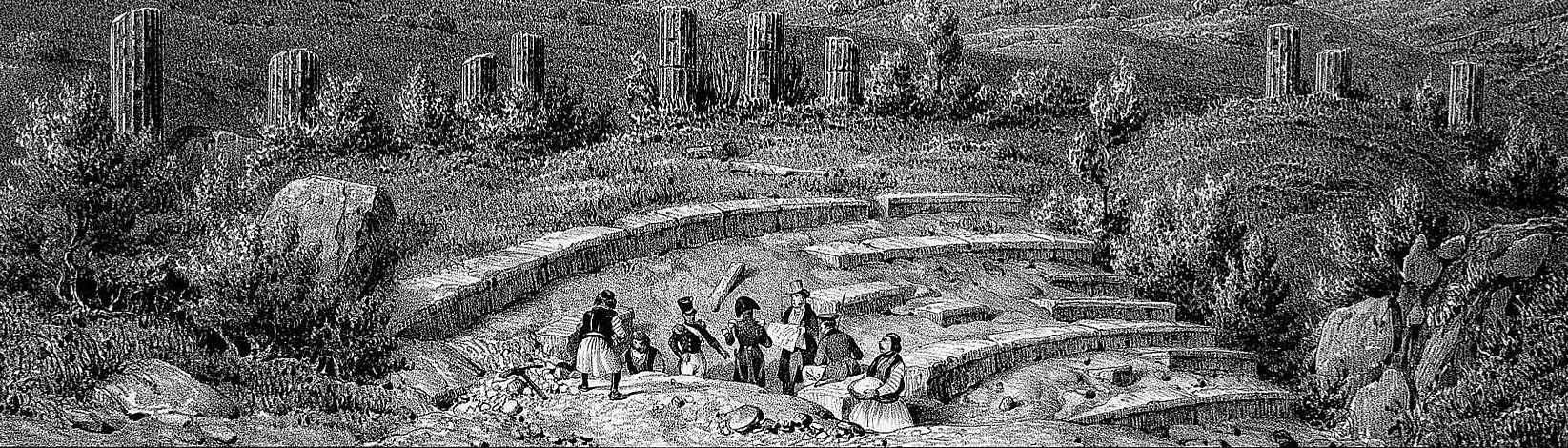
The members of the scientific commission of the Morea Expedition in the stadium of ancient Messene in 1829 (detail of a lithograph by Prosper Baccuet)

Systematic excavation of the site was first undertaken by Themistoklis Sofoulis of the Athens Archaeological Society in 1895. Since then a number of noted archaeologists have made contributions, such as George Oikonomos (in 1909 and 1925), Anastasios Orlandos (in 1957), and Petros Themelis (in 1986). A museum of their extensive finds has been constructed within the old city walls.

This site was awarded a European Union Prize for Cultural Heritage / Europa Nostra Award in 2011.

The systematic excavation under the direction of Prof. Petros Themelis has collaborated with many international institutions for excavation at the site. Among those, since 2020-21, excavation East of the temenos of Asclepius at the site of an early Christian church is conducted by the Open University of Cyprus.

== History ==
=== Bronze Age Messana ===
During the Bronze Age the palace at Pylos controlled Messenia politically and economically. A Linear B tablet from there, PY Cn 3, mentions a region called Mezana in local Mycenaean Greek (Linear B: 𐀕𐀼𐀙, me-za-na), from which groups of men named from places in the Peloponnesus each contributed one ox (Linear B: 𐀦𐀃, qo-o; also denoted by the BOS ideogram, i.e. 𐀘) to an official, possibly a priest in the Zeus-sanctuary, named *Diwijeus (Linear B: 𐀇𐀹𐀋𐀸, di-wi-je-we DAT; the word could be, instead of an anthroponym, an adjective meaning "priest in the Zeus-sanctuary"). These groups were members of the coast-watchers, a military or quasi-military unit that presumably were stationed to guard various locations on the coast. Their failure is attested by the burning of Pylos a few months later by unknown assailants from the sea. The watchers include some Olumpiaioi (Olympians) from Orumanthos (Mt. Erymanthos). John Bennet expressed the opinion that by Mezana is meant Messana, a Mycenaean Greek form of Messene. He supposed that the region around Ithome would already have had that name, to be reutilized by Epaminondas a thousand years later.

=== Reconstitution of the city by the Thebans ===
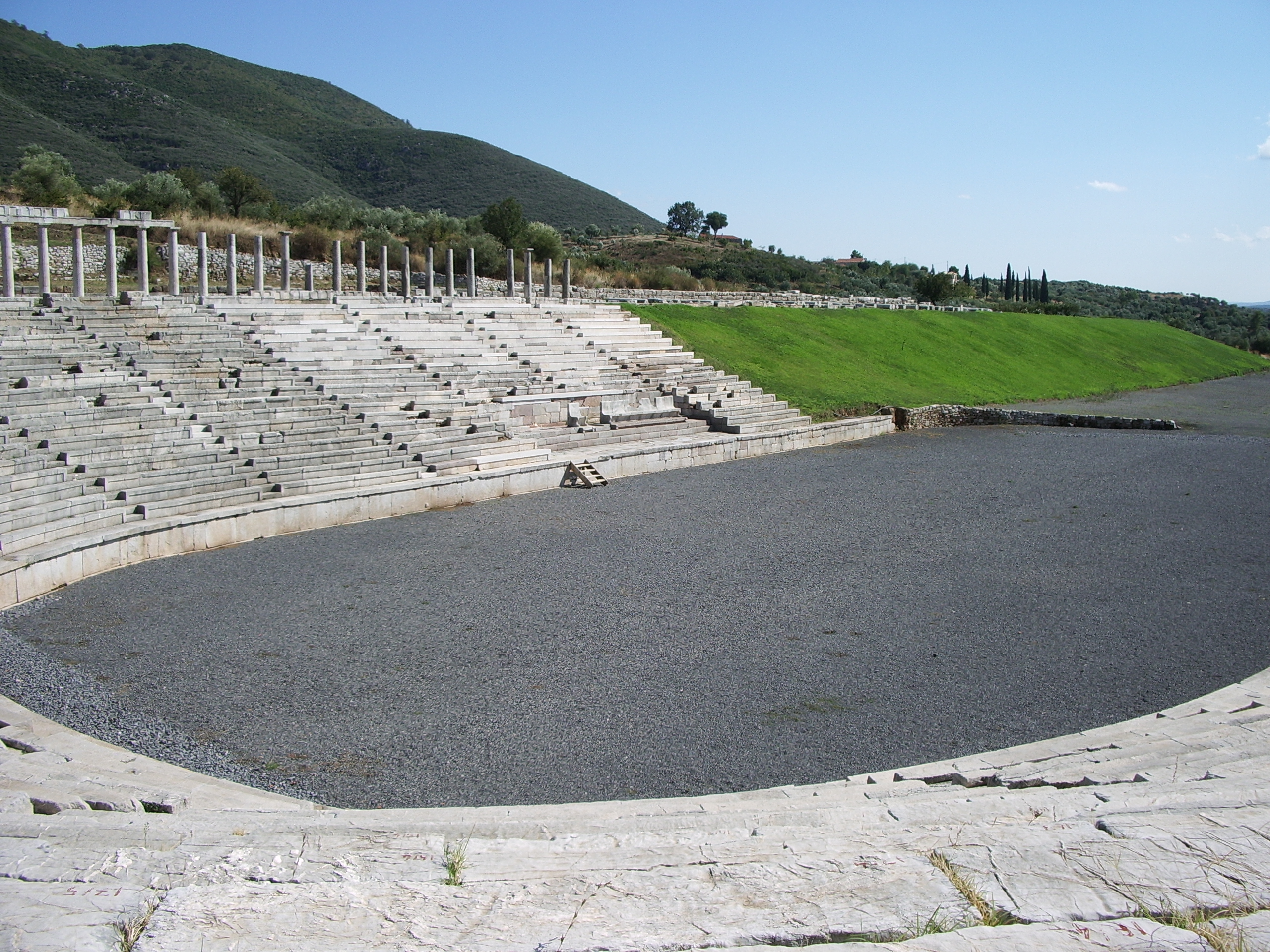
The ancient Stadion

After the defeat of the Spartan army at the Battle of Leuctra in Boeotia, 371 BC, the helots of Messenia revolted yet again against their Spartan overlords. This time the victorious general, Epaminondas, entered the Peloponnesus with an army of Boeotians, Argives and Messenians living abroad. Epaminondas resolved to support an independent Peloponnesus by building three fortified cities, Megalopolis and Mantinea in Arcadia and Messene in Messenia.

After all due care to obtain omens from the gods, make sacrifices and invite the spirits of past rulers and heroes to live in Messene, including Queen Messene, Epaminondas invited construction engineers and artisans from anywhere to join him. In 85 days the combined armies and exiles guided by the engineers and artisans had completed the walled city of Messene over the site of the previous Ithome. The city included within its walls Mt. Ithome and enough agricultural land and spring captures to withstand a siege indefinitely. The policy was justified almost immediately. After the departure of the Theban army the Spartans attempted to retake Messenia, which then allied itself with the Macedonians. This time the long struggle with Sparta was brought to a final end by the Macedonian conquest of Greece.

After the departure of the allies, the new city and the fate of Messenian independence were left in the hands of the Messenian exiles, who had returned primarily from Sicily and North Africa. Apparently, they had maintained a transitory community in exile, or diaspora, for some 300 years. They spoke a Doric dialect. Pausanias reports, "even to this day they preserve it in its purity better than anywhere else in the Peloponnese." As the Arcadians are known to have spoken a dialect closely related to Mycenaean Greek, the exiles restored were not from the original Achaean refugees of the return of the Heracleidae, but were the Doricised population that developed in the 7th century BC under the subsequently dispossessed Heraclid dynasty of Messene.

== The Site ==
=== City walls ===
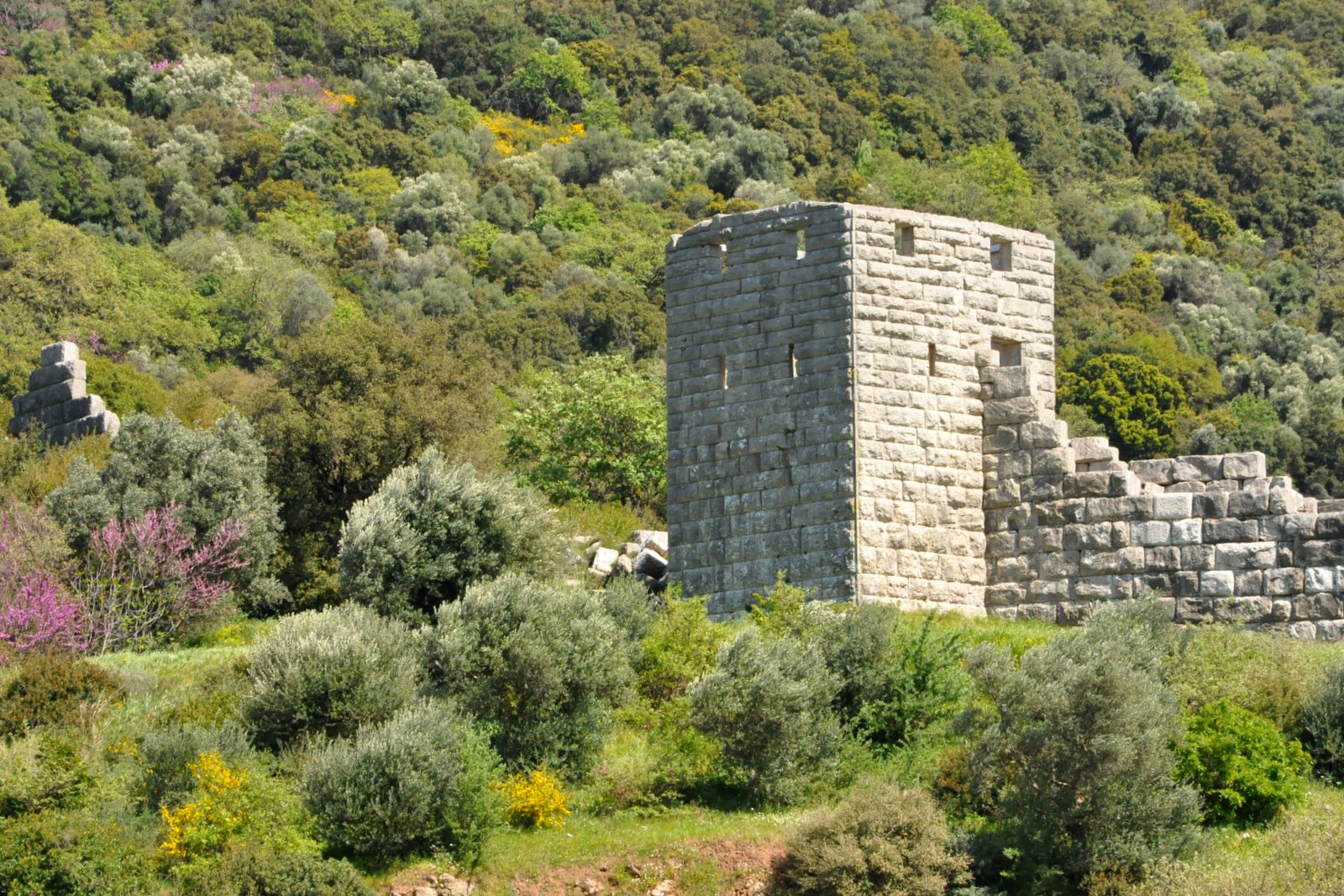
A watchtower in the circuit wall

Messene was surrounded by a circuit wall 9 km (5.6 mi) long, 7 metres (23 feet) — 9 metres (30 feet) high. It was fortified by 30 square or horseshoe-shaped guard towers (and probably barracks) with doors admitting passage to a protected walkway on top of the wall. The wall was pierced by two main gates flanked by protective structures and rectangular in shape with a lintel of a single, massive beam of limestone. Through the Arcadia Gate to the north ran and still runs the main road north (to Arcadia), currently from Mavromati. As Mavromati is the location of the major spring capture, klepsydra, it was probably the first stop for travellers to the city. From there a road runs over the ridge adjoining Mounts Ithome and Eva to the Laconia Gate, similar to the Arcadia Gate. The wall runs straight up the ridge but does not encompass Mount Eva. Today the next stop on the road is the monastery, Mone Voulkanou, set into the lower southeast flank of Mounts Eva.

=== Public buildings and monuments ===
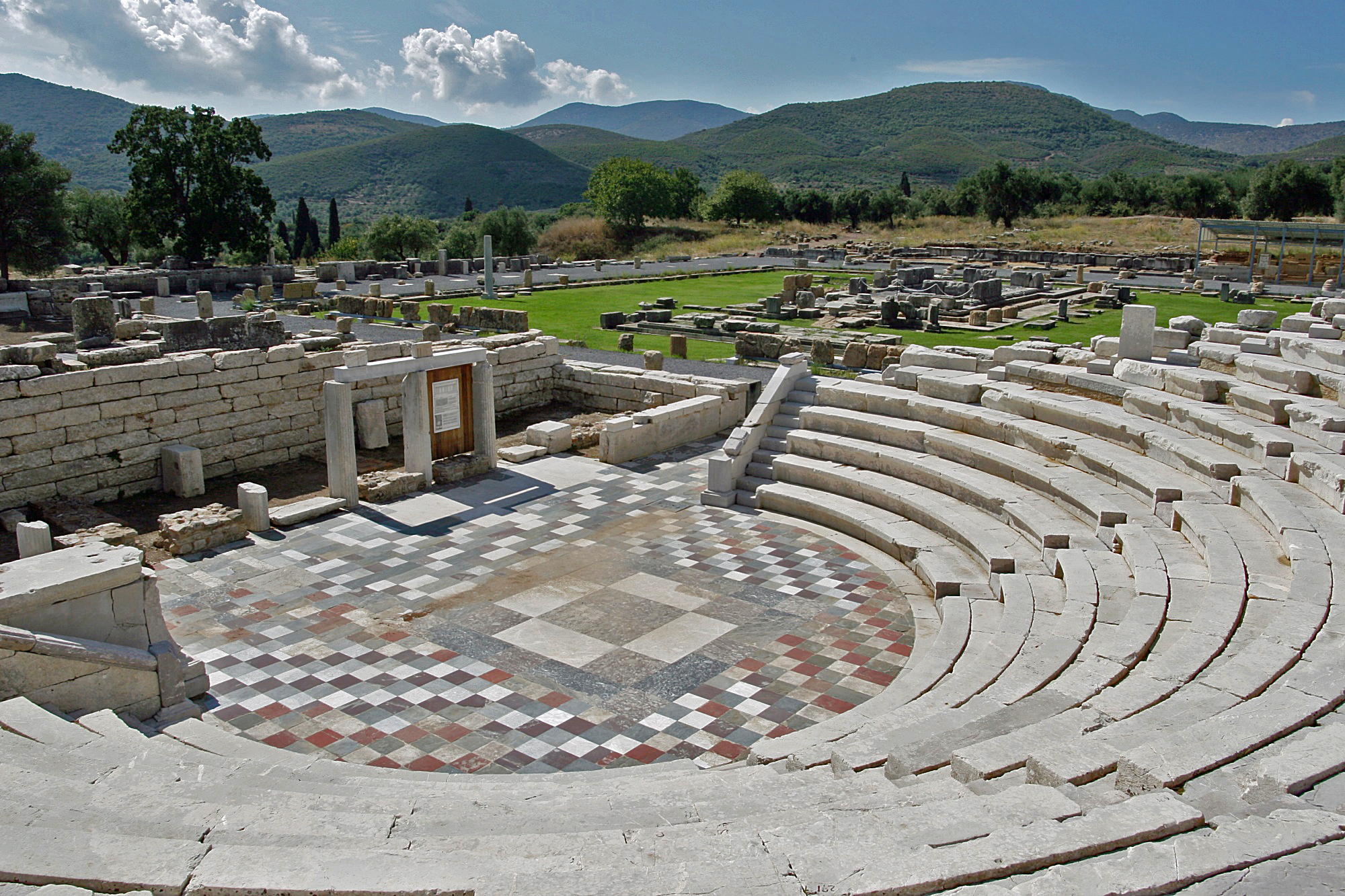
View of the Odeon

Pausanias has left a description of the city, its chief temples and statues, its springs, its market-place and gymnasium, the Asclepieion, its place of sacrifice, the tomb of the hero Aristomenes and the temple of Zeus Ithomatas on the summit of the acropolis with a statue by the famous Argive sculptor Ageladas, originally made for the Messenian helots who had settled at Naupactus at the close of the third Messenian War.

The other buildings which can be identified are the theatre, the stadium, the council chamber or Bouleuterion, and the propylaeum of the market, while on the shoulder of the mountain are the foundations of a small temple, probably that of Artemis Laphria.

=== Early Christian and Byzantine monuments ===
As Messene continued to be an important urban center of SW Peloponnese all through Late Antiquity, a considerable number of Early Christian and Byzantine monuments have been excavated and are now visible and partially restored. Of special importance is a 3rd and 4th century CE house church that was created inside a luxurious Roman urban house in order to accommodate the needs of the Early Christian community of Messene and serve as a prayer room and assembly hall. This building constitutes one of the very few known early domus ecclesiae buildings. The house church was destroyed in the 365 CE earthquake and abandoned afterwards.

From the sixth century dates a large three-aisled basilica built near the old Theater of the city, at an area where a Christian cemetery had developed.

== Notable people ==
- Aristomenes (7th century BC), mythical hero king of Messenia
- Alcaeus (3rd century BC), author of epigrams
- Damophon (2nd century BC), sculptor
- Euhemerus (4th century BC), mythographer

== Bibliography ==
- Hellenic Interior Ministry (18 March 2001). Δείτε τη Διοικητική Διαίρεση (in Greek). Hellenic Interior Ministry.. The previous Kapodistrias organization of all the communities in Greece. The populations are from the Census of 2001.
- Themelis, Petros G (2010) [2009]. "Ancient Messene: An Important Site in SW Peloponnesus" (PDF). The Australian Archaeological Institute at Athens Bulletin. 7: 28–37. Archived from the original (PDF) on 2012-04-25.
