= Laconophilia =

Love or admiration of Sparta

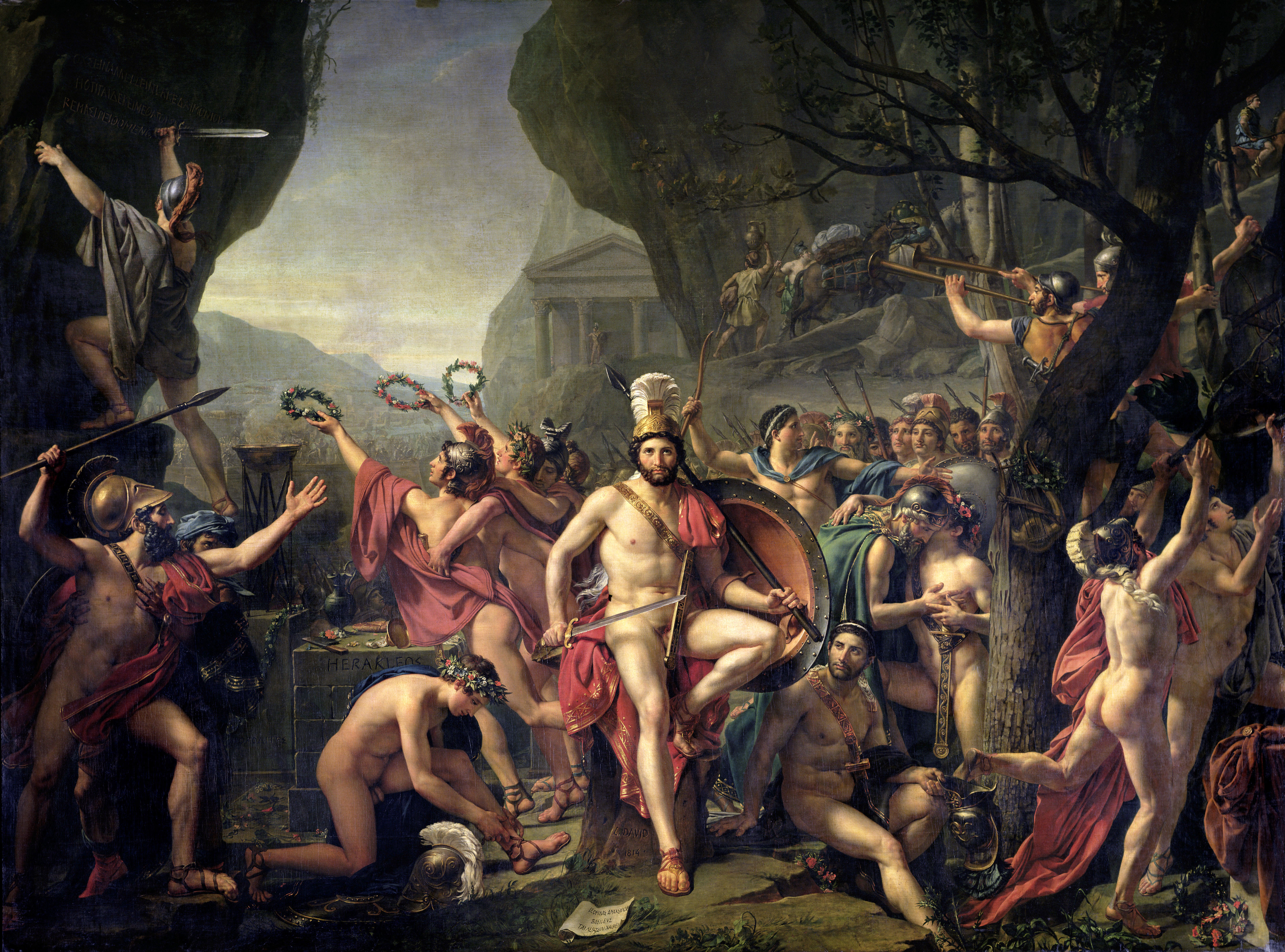
Leonidas at Thermopylae, 1814 painting by Jacques-Louis David

Laconophilia is love or admiration of Sparta and of the Spartan culture or constitution. The term derives from Laconia, the part of the Peloponnesus where the Spartans lived.

Admirers of the Spartans typically praise their valour and success in war, their "laconic" austerity and self-restraint, their aristocratic and virtuous ways, the stable order of their political life, and their constitution, with its tripartite mixed government. Ancient Laconophilia started to appear as early as the 5th century BC, and even contributed a new verb to Ancient Greek: λακωνίζειν (literally: to act like a Laconian). Praise of the Spartan city-state persisted within classical literature ever afterward, and surfaced again during the Renaissance.

The French classicist François Ollier in his 1933 book Le mirage spartiate (The Spartan Mirage) warned that a major scholarly problem is that all surviving accounts of Sparta were by non-Spartans who often excessively idealized their subject. The term "Spartan Mirage" has come to refer to "idealized distortions and inventions regarding the character of Spartan society in the works of non-Spartan writers," beginning in Greek and Roman antiquity and continuing through the medieval and modern eras. These accounts of Sparta are typically associated with the social or political concerns of the writer. No accounts survive by the Spartans themselves, if such were ever written.

== Ancient Laconophilia ==
=== Athens ===
In ancient Athens, Laconism began as a current of thought and feeling after the Persian Wars. Some, like Cimon, son of Miltiades, believed that Athens should ally with Sparta against the Persian Empire. Cimon persuaded the Athenians to send soldiers to aid Sparta, when the helots (serfs of the Spartans) revolted and fortified Mount Ithome. The Spartans sent the Athenians home again with thanks, lest democratic Athenian ideas influence the helots or the Perioeci.

Some Athenians, especially those who disliked commerce, preferred a closed society and the rule of the few. They believed that the Spartan Constitution was superior to their own. Some even went so far as to imitate Spartan manners by going around Athens long-haired and unwashed, like the Spartiates. Plato's Republic, which is set in the 5th century BC, gives credibility to this claim by having Socrates opine that the Spartan or Cretan type of political regime is the favorite of "the many".

A group of extreme Laconising oligarchs, known as the Thirty Tyrants, seized power in Athens in 404 BC and held it for eleven months, assisted by a Spartan army. Their rule, however, was quickly overthrown, and democracy was reinstated.

In 371 BC, the Spartans were defeated in the Battle of Leuctra. As a result of that defeat, Sparta's allies revolted and the helots of Messenia were freed. Afterwards, the Spartan economy became less able to support professional soldiers, and inequalities between supposedly equal citizens increased. As a result, the reputation of Sparta, either as a military success or as a guide in domestic affairs, diminished substantially.

=== Philosophers ===
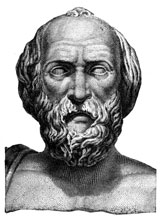
Lycurgus of Sparta, legendary founder of the city's constitution

Laconophiles nevertheless remained among the philosophers. Some of the young men who followed Socrates had been Laconophiles. Socrates himself is portrayed as praising the laws of Sparta and Crete. Critias, a companion of Socrates, helped bring about the oligarchic rule of the Thirty Tyrants, who were supported by Sparta. Xenophon, another disciple of Socrates, fought for the Spartans against Athens. Plato also, in his writings, seems to prefer a Spartan-type regime over a democratic one. Aristotle regarded the kind of laws adopted by Crete and Sparta as especially apt to produce virtuous and law-abiding citizens, although he also criticises the Cretans and Spartans themselves as incompetent and corrupt, and built on a culture of war.

Greek philosophy, therefore, inherited a tradition of praising Spartan law. This was only reinforced when Agis IV and Cleomenes III attempted to "restore the ancestral constitution" at Sparta, which no man then living had experienced. This attempt ended with the collapse of the institutions of Lycurgus, and one Nabis established a tyranny in Laconia.

In later centuries, Greek philosophers, especially Platonists, often described Sparta as an ideal state, strong, brave, and free from the corruptions of commerce and money. These descriptions, of which Plutarch's is the most complete, vary in many details. Many scholars have attempted to reconstruct which parts of these "utopias" the classical Spartans actually practised, and which parts Cleomenes, or later classical authors, invented.

It became fashionable for the Romans to visit Lacedaemon and see the rites of Artemis Orthia, as a sort of tourist attraction – the nearest Greece had to offer to gladiatorial games.

=== Contrary views ===
Even in ancient cultures, Laconophilia was a tendency, not an absolute. None of the contemporaries of the Lycurgan Constitution praised Sparta without reservations, except the Spartans themselves.

Herodotus of Halicarnassus, consistently portrays the Spartans, except when actually facing battle, as rustic, hesitant, uncooperative, corrupt, and naïve. Plato had Socrates argue that a state which really followed the simple life would not need a warrior class; one which was luxurious and aggressive would need a group of philosophers, like Plato himself, to guide and deceive the guardians. Even Xenophon's encomium of the Constitution of the Lacedaemonians is not unalloyed praise.

Aristotle criticises the Spartans in his Politics: the helots keep rebelling; the Spartan women are luxurious; the magistrates (and especially the ephors) are irresponsible; reaching decisions by the loudest yell in the apella is silly; the wealth of the citizens is unequal (so that too many are losing the resources necessary to be a citizen and a hoplite); and the Spartiates let each other evade taxes, so the city is poor and the individual citizens are greedy. Above all, the Spartans know no other arts than war, so in peace they are incompetent and corrupt. The Cretan institutions, he says, are even worse.

Even after the collapse, and idealisation, of Sparta, Polybius wrote, "My object, then, in this digression is to make it manifest by actual facts that, for guarding their own country with absolute safety, and for preserving their own freedom, the legislation of Lycurgus was entirely sufficient; and for those who are content with these objects we must concede that there neither exists nor ever has existed a constitution and civil order preferable to that of Sparta."

== Modern Laconophilia ==
Admiration of Sparta continued in the Renaissance. Niccolò Machiavelli agreed that Sparta was noteworthy for its long and static existence, but nevertheless asserted that, for virtù and glory, Rome was far more preferable (Discourses). The Elizabethan English constitutionalist John Aylmer compared the mixed government of Tudor England with the Spartan republic, commending "Lacedaemonia [meaning Sparta], the noblest and best city governed that ever was" as a model for England. The Swiss-French philosopher Jean-Jacques Rousseau contrasted Sparta favourably with Athens in his Discourse on the Arts and Sciences, arguing that its austere constitution was preferable to the more cultured nature of Athenian life. Samuel Adams expressed a disappointment that the American republic was failing to meet his ideal of a "Christian Sparta".

Alexander Hamilton mocked the Laconophilia of his era as unrealistic:

We may preach till we are tired of the theme, the necessity of disinterestedness in republics, without making a single proselyte. The virtuous declaimer will neither persuade himself nor any other person to be content with a double mess of porridge, instead of a reasonable stipend for his services. We might as soon reconcile ourselves to the Spartan community of goods and wives, to their iron coin, their long beards, or their black broth. There is a total dissimulation in the circumstances, as well as the manners, of society among us; and it is as ridiculous to seek for models in the simple ages of Greece and Rome, as it would be to go in quest of them among the Hottentots and Laplanders.

Laconophilia increased in importance during the nineteenth century. Sparta was used as a model of social purity by Revolutionary and Napoleonic France. Slavoj Žižek stated that "all modern egalitarian radicals, from Rousseau to the Jacobins...imagined the republican France as a new Sparta".

=== Early Zionism ===
Early Zionists, and particularly the founders of the Kibbutz movement in Israel, had been influenced by Spartan ideals, and drew on the Spartan model in particular when disparaging the materialistic values they associated with the diaspora communities they had left. Tabenkin, for example, a founding father of the Kibbutz and the Palmach, was greatly influenced by ancient Sparta. He prescribed that "fighters' education should begin from the nursery", that children should from kindergarten age be taken to "spend nights in the mountains and valleys", taught to fight, and educated for war.

=== Racial Laconophilia ===
==== Karl Müller ====
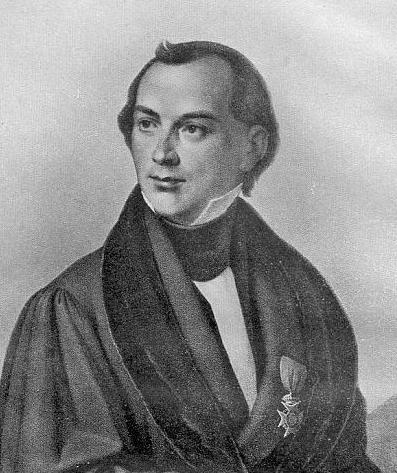
Karl Müller

A new element was introduced into Laconophilia by Karl Otfried Müller, who linked Spartan ideals to the supposed racial superiority of the Dorians, the ethnic sub-group of the Greeks to which the Spartans belonged. While the Greek Laconophiles like Plutarch had praised the Spartans, they did not extend this admiration to the Dorians as a whole. Plutarch argued that the founder of their constitution, Lycurgus, had inherited corrupt Dorian institutions. Argos, the traditional enemy of Sparta, was also a Dorian state; so were Corinth, Rhodes, and Syracuse, three of the most commercial states in Greece.

In 1824, however, Müller wrote Die Dorier, a history of the Dorian race. It has been described as a "thousand-page fantasia", which portrays the Dorians as a heroic and noble race who expanded into Greece from the north. He used the new disciplines of comparative linguistics and source-criticism to argue that the Dorians represented a distinct ethno-linguistic group whose original culture could be isolated from later influences. He linked the origin of the Dorians to the mythic Myrmidons of the Trojan war, and their leader Achilles.

==== Nazi Laconophilia ====
Müller's emphasis on the northern origins and racial qualities of the Spartans later fed into the development of Nordicism, the theory of the superiority of a North European Master Race. Later German writers regularly portrayed the Spartans as a model for the modern Prussian state, which also emphasised military self-discipline. It was a short step from this to argue that the Prussians and the Spartans were originally of the same race. Frank H. Hankins summarises views of the American Nordicist Madison Grant, writing in 1916:

Sparta is pictured as particularly Nordic on account of the purity of its Dorian stock, while Athens is more of a mixture. Sparta thus exhibited the military efficiency, the thorough organization and the patriotic sacrifice of the individual to the state characteristic of Nordics everywhere and exemplified in modern Prussia, while Athens exhibited the intellectual brilliancy, the instability, the extreme individualism, the tendency to treason and conspiracy so characteristic of populations having a large Mediterranean element.

These arguments were repeated by Nazi race theorists such as Hans F. K. Günther and Alfred Rosenberg. Adolf Hitler particularly praised the Spartans, recommending in 1928 that Germany should imitate them by limiting "the number allowed to live". He added that "The Spartans were once capable of such a wise measure... The subjugation of 350,000 Helots by 6,000 Spartans was only possible because of the racial superiority of the Spartans." The Spartans had created "the first racialist state."

Following the invasion of the USSR, Hitler insisted that the Slavs should be treated like the helots under the Spartans: "They [the Spartans] came as conquerors, and they took everything", and so should the Germans. A Nazi officer specified that "the Germans would have to assume the position of the Spartiates, while... the Russians were the Helots."

=== Contemporary Laconophilia ===
Modern Laconophilia has been present in popular culture, particularly with reference to the Battle of Thermopylae, as portrayed in films such as The 300 Spartans. It is also evident in the graphic novel 300 and the film derived from it.

In the modern world, the adjective "spartan" is used to imply simplicity, frugality, or avoidance of luxury and comfort. Because of their reputation for physical prowess, the name "Spartans" has been adopted by teams in several sports. Michigan State University adopted "Spartans" as their collegiate team identity in 1925. In addition to the Michigan State Spartans, other teams include the San Jose State Spartans, Norfolk State Spartans, and others. Soccer clubs include Sparta Prague (Czech Republic), Spartans (Scotland), Ħamrun Spartans (Malta), Sparta Rotterdam (Netherlands).

== See also ==
- Philhellenism

== Bibliography ==
- Cartledge, P. Sparta: New Perspectives (London, 1999).
- –––. 'The Socratics Sparta and Rousseau's' in: S. Hodkinson, A. Powell (eds.) Sparta: New Perspectives (Londen, 1999) 311-337.
- –––. The Spartans: The World of the Warrior-Heroes of Ancient Greece, from Utopia to Crisis an Collapse (Woodstock, 2003).
- Dawson, D. Cities of the Gods: Communist Utopias in Greek thought (Oxford, 1992).
- Ferguson, J. Utopias of the Classical World (London, 1975). Discusses the spartiate character of classical utopian literature.
- Hodkinson, S. 'The imaginary Spartan Politeia' in: M.H. Hansen (ed.) The Imaginary Polis, Historisk Filosofiske Meddelelser 91 (Copenhagen, 2005) 222–281.
- Jäger, W. Paideia: The Ideals of Greek Culture ed. trans. H. Gilbert (Oxford, 1939).
- Jenkyns, R. The Victorians and Ancient Greece (Oxford, 1980).
- Kitto, H.D.F. The Greeks (Middlesex, 1951).
- Mendle, M. Dangerous Positions; Mixed Government, the Estates of the Realm, and the Making of the "Answer to the xix propositions" (Tuscaloosa, 1985).
- Müller, K.O. The History and Antiquities of the Doric Race trans. H. Tufnell, G.C. Lewis (London, 1839).
- Ollier, F. Le Mirage Spartiate : étude sur l'idealisation de Sparte dans l'antiquité grecque (Paris, 1933).
- Powell, A. & S. Hodkinson (eds.) The Shadow of Sparta (London, 1994). Contains studies into the views on Sparta of several non-Spartan Greeks, e.g. Xenophon, Aristophanes, Plato.
- Rawson, E. The Spartan Tradition in European Thought (Oxford, 1969).
- Schofield, M. Plato: Political Philosophy (Oxford, 2006).
- Ste. Croix, G.E.M. de The Origins of the Peloponnesian War (London, 1972).
- Tigerstedt, Ε.Ν. The Legend of Sparta in Classical antiquity I-III (1965–72, Stockholm/Göteborg/Uppsala).
- Turner, F. The Greek Heritage in Victorian Britain (London, 1981).
