= Battle of Mantinea (418 BC) =

Spartan victory against Argos, Athens and Mantinea

- Part of the Peloponnesian War
Date	418 BC
Location	Mantinea 37.6°N 22.4°E
Result	Spartan victory

Belligerents
Sparta; Tegea; Heraea; Maenalia; Other Arcadian allies of Sparta	Argos; Athens; Mantinea; Other Arcadian allies of Argos

Commanders and leaders
Agis II; Pharax; Hipponoïdas; Aristocles	Laches †; Nicostratus †

Strength
Total: About 9,200: 3,600 Spartans; 2,000 Brasidian veterans and Neodamodes; 600 Sciritae; 3,000 Arcadians (including 1,500 Tegeans)	Total: About 9,300: 4,000–5,000 Argives; 1,300 Athenians; 2,000–3000 Mantineans, Cleonaeans, Orneans, Aeginetans and other allied forces

Casualties and losses
About 300 Spartans with insignificant other allied casualties	About 1,300 (800 Argives, 300 Mantineans, 200 Athenians and Aeginetans)
- Location of the Battle of Mantinea (418 BC).

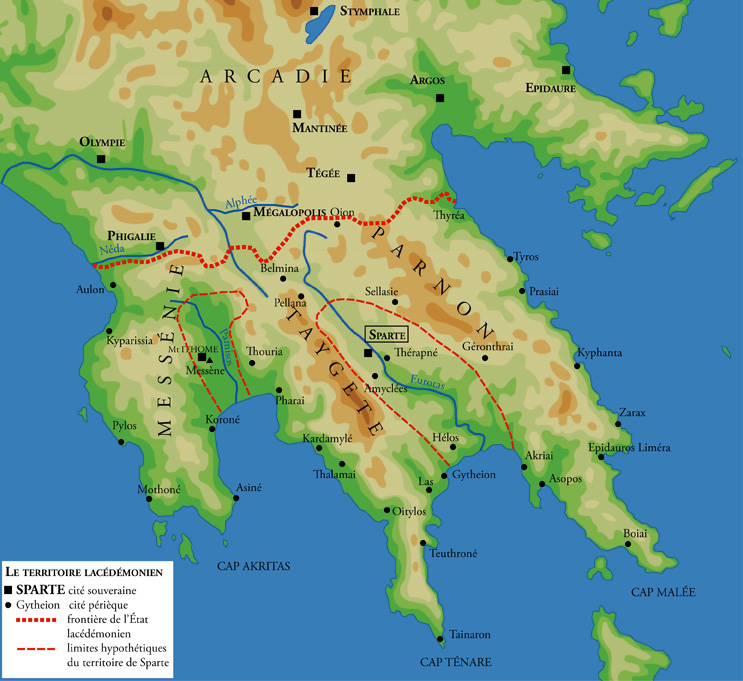
Topographical map of the Peloponnese detailing ancient Spartan territory

The first Battle of Mantinea was fought in 418 BC during the Peloponnesian War. In this battle, Sparta and its Peloponnesian allies defeated an allied army of Argos, Athens, Mantinea and several others.

== Background ==
In 421 BC, after ten years of war, Athens and Sparta made peace; the Peace of Nicias. Several years later an alliance of democracies arose in the Peloponnese, threatening Sparta's hegemony over the peninsula. After the alliance between the Argives, Achaeans, Eleans, and Athens, the Spartans were defeated in the Olympic Games of 420 BC After the invasion of Epidaurus by Athens and its allies, Sparta chose to retaliate, fearing their potential alliance with Corinth. The army that was amassed was, according to Thucydides, "the best army ever assembled in Greece to that time". The Spartan king Agis concluded the first campaign with a truce, without explaining his actions to the army or his allies. Soon after the Argives denounced the truce and resumed the war, capturing the key town of Orchomenus. As a result, Spartans directed their anger towards Agis, who avoided a 10,000 drachmas fine and the destruction of his house, by promising to redeem himself with a victory. The ephors placed Agis under the supervision of ten symbouloi (advisers), whose consent was required for whatever military action he wished to take.

== Prelude ==
Late in 418, the Argives and their allies marched against Tegea, where a faction was prepared to turn the city over to the Argive alliance. Tegea controlled the exit from Laconia. Enemy control of the town would mean that the Spartans would be unable to move out of their home city and would result in the demise of the Peloponnesian coalition that fought the Archidamian War.

Agis marched the whole of the Spartan army, including neodamodes and everyone who was able to fight in Sparta into Tegea where he was joined by his allies from Arcadia. Agis sent for help from his northern allies, Corinth, Boeotia, Phocis, and Locris. However, the northern army could not arrive at the scene in time, as they had not expected the call and would have to pass through enemy territory (Argos and Orchomenus). On the whole, the army of the allies of Sparta would have numbered around 9,000 hoplites.

In the meantime, the Eleans wanted to attack Lepreum, a contested border town with Sparta. They chose to withdraw their contingent of 3,000 hoplites and march for Lepreum. Agis took advantage of the withdrawal and sent a sixth of his army, with the youngest and the oldest hoplites home to guard Sparta proper. They were called back soon after, as Agis or the symbouloi realized that the Eleans would soon be back on the side of the Argives, but did not arrive in time for the battle.

Agis could have bided his time inside the walls of Tegea, waiting for his northern allies. However, he was already discredited and could not show the slightest sign of shying away from the battle. So he invaded the territory around Mantinea, about 15 km north of Tegea and a member of the Argive alliance, to force a pitched battle with the Argives and their allies. The Argive army, however, was situated on the ground "steep and hard to get at" and would not be drawn into battle, probably because the grain harvest had already been stored (the battle probably took place at the end of September 418). Agis, who was desperate for a victory to redeem his embarrassment at Argos, charged ahead; but according to Thucydides, when the armies had closed to a stone's throw, "one of the elder Spartans" (the symboulos Pharax, according to Diodorus) advised him not to try to correct one error (his former defeat) with another. The Spartans therefore retreated and went off to find a way to draw out the Argive army to a battle. So they diverted the Sarandapotamos River to the bed of the smaller Zanovistas river, or, they just filled up the sinkholes in which Zanovistas flowed, in order to flood the Mantinean territory.

Instead of allowing Mantinea to be flooded, the Argive army moved quicker than the Spartans anticipated, as the Argive hoplites were angry at their generals for not pursuing the Spartan army and accused them of treason. They surprised their enemies by drawing up as the Spartans emerged from a nearby wood. The Spartans quickly organized themselves, with no time to wait for their other allies. Brasidas' veterans (Brasidas himself had been killed at the Battle of Amphipolis), and the Sciritae formed the left wing, the Spartans, Arcadians, Heraeans, and Maenalians in the centre, and the Tegeans, who were fighting for their homeland took the position of honour on the right wing. The Argive lines were formed by the Mantineans on the right, the Argives in the centre, and the Athenians on the left.

== Opposing forces ==
Thucydides, the main contemporary source on the battle, did not know the exact numbers of men on each side but estimated that there were about 9,000 men on the Spartan side with somewhat fewer men on the Argive coalition's side, about 8,000 according to Donald Kagan. Other scholars, such as Victor Davis Hanson, give slightly bigger numbers.

The Spartan army of around 9,000 men must have included about 3,600 Spartans (Thucydides mentions six Spartan morea), around 2,000 Brasidian veterans and recently recruited Neodamodes, 600 Sciritae, and 3,000 Arcadians (including 1,500 Tegeans).

The Argive coalition's army had 4,000–5,000 Argives, 2,000–3,000 Arcadians (Mantineans, Cleoneans, Orneaens) and 1,000 Athenian hoplites and 300 Athenian horsemen.

== Battle ==
As the battle began, each side's right wing began to outflank the other's left, due to the erratic movements of each hoplite trying to cover himself with the shield of the man beside him. Agis tried to strengthen the line by ordering the Sciritae and his left to break off contact with the rest of the army and match the length of the Argive line. To cover the void created, he ordered the companies of Hipponoidas and Aristocles to leave their positions in the center and cover the line. This however was not achieved, for the two captains were unable, or unwilling to complete these maneuvers on such short notice. Donald Kagan considers it an ill-advised move and gives credit to the two captains for disobeying orders that could have lost the battle for the Spartans. Others considered that the original move could have succeeded.

In any case, the Mantineans and the right part of the Argives, the elite Argive Thousand, entered the gap and routed the Brasideans and the Sciritae, and pursued them for a long distance. In the meantime, the Tegeans and the regular Spartan army routed the Argives and Arcadians in the center. Most of them did not stand to fight, but they fled as the Spartans approached; some were trampled in their hurry to get away before the enemy reached them. While the Argive-Arcadian center was being chased off the field, the Athenians who formed the left were beginning to get encircled. Their cavalry prevented a rout, allowing the Athenian infantry to retreat in good order. Agis did not pursue the Athenians but turned the center and right around and marched to give support to his hard-pressed left. The Mantineans were chased off the field with heavy losses while the Spartans allowed the Argive Thousand to escape virtually unharmed.

The Spartans did not pursue the enemy for long after the battle was won.

== Aftermath ==
The Argive side lost about 1,100 men (700 Argives and Arcadians, 200 Athenians and 200 Mantineans), and the Spartans about 300.

The Spartans sent an embassy to Argos and the Argives accepted a truce by the terms of which they gave up Orchomenus, and all their hostages and joined up with the Spartans in evicting the Athenians from Epidaurus. They also renounced their alliance with Elis and Athens. After deposing the democratic government of Sicyon, the Argive Thousand staged a coup against the democratic rule of Argos. The democrats' morale was low because of the bad performance of the common army and the Athenians in the battle.

In more general terms, the battle was a considerable boost to the Lacedaemonians' morale and prestige, because after the disaster at Pylos they had been considered cowardly and incompetent in battle. Their success at Mantinea marked a reversal of the trend.

== Sources ==
- Thucydides, The Peloponnesian War. Athens, Philippos Pappas, Nikolaos Philippas; Athens, Papyros. 1953.
- Kagan, Donald. (2003). The Peloponnesian War. New York: Viking Press. ISBN 0-670-03211-5.
- Victor Davis Hanson. A War Like No Other: How the Athenians and Spartans Fought the Peloponnesian War. Random House, October 2005.
