= Spartiate =

Citizens of ancient Sparta

A Spartiate (Greek: Σπαρτιάτης, Spartiátēs) or Homoios (pl. Homoioi, Greek: Ὅμοιος, "alike") was an elite full-citizen man of the ancient Greek city-state of Sparta. They served as one of the city-state's ruling bodies, as well as heavy infantry in times of war. Known for their militaristic indoctrination since childhood, the Spartiate became renowned for their prowess in battle. However, their population decreased over time due to strict qualification, which affected the city-state in the years to come.

== Origins ==
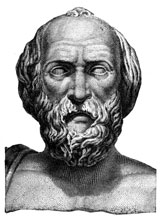
Lycurgus

According to classical accounts, the Spartan Constitution was the product of the legendary lawgiver Lycurgus. He was said to have written the Spartan constitution early in the Archaic period, but dates in historical sources are wildly inconsistent, making it impossible to determine whether Lycurgus was an actual historical figure. It is clear, however, that at some point in the late Archaic period, the model of Spartan society shifted from a monarchical system to an aristocracy of the elite warrior class.

The change is likely to have been in some way related to the transition from "Dark Age" warfare, in which nobles were the dominant force, to the hoplite warfare of the classical period. Around the time of that change, Sparta embarked on the conquest of the neighboring state of Messenia. The acquisition of such a comparatively large piece of territory and conquered population seems to have both provided the basis for the system of helotage, and required the existence of a large military force to keep the potentially rebellious Messenians under control. The Spartiates thus became a permanently armed master class, living off the labor of the helots and preventing rebellion through constant struggle.

== Characteristics ==
Spartan citizenship was restricted to adult men without metic ancestry, as in most Greek poleis. In a system known as the kleros, full citizens were assigned to different plots of land to organize and develop through the use of the helot serfdom. This made the Spartiate similar to landed gentry. In order to keep the helots in check, all Spartiate must be trained and skilled in suppressing potential revolts and thus the need for a military-style system. As with landed gentry from other ethnicity or time periods, Spartiate cultivated a society marked by proud tradition, customs, and warrior ethos.

A certain income was required to maintain syssitia membership, and thus Spartiate status. The syssitia were common-messes where all Spartans ate, though it could also be a term for military unit that numbered to 300 men. Spartiates were expected to adhere to an ideal of military valor, as exemplified by the poems of Tyrtaeus, who praised men who fell in battle and heaped scorn on those who fled. Such ideals were standard for hoplite forces across Greece, as they relied on each man defending each other with the shield. Politically, Spartiate men composed the army assembly, the body that elected the ephors, the most powerful magistrates of Sparta after the kings. This type of governing body resulted in an oligarchy that was responsible to the organizing of the nation.

=== Training ===
Spartiate upbringing has been noted throughout history for its brutality. From birth, prospective infants were inspected for any deformities and illnesses that they may carry growing up. Those who did not qualify were left in the forest to die. Male Spartiate would live under the care of his mother or any guardian until the age of 7, where afterwards he would be taken to live with other boys under the care of older Spartiate. This system became known as the agoge. Contrary to popular belief, there were no records for weaponry or formation drill trainings in the agoge. Surviving detailed accounts stated that the only physical training Spartiate underwent were athletic exercises and dances, besides being taught how to read and write. Wrestling was taught, though one later record suggest that the majority of combat sports were not favored.

That being said, there was a level of harshness imposed on the boys. They were purposely starved to the point that they had to steal in order to survive, as well as forced to endure other hardships in order to embed strict obedience. By the age of 12, young Spartiate finally got to handle weapons as part of the crypteia - select groups of men whose job was to cull helot population by assassinating prominent individuals who may inspire the slave-class to revolt. Some accounts also detailed wanton slaughter of any other helots found walking alone and at night. Upon reaching young adulthood, the Spartiate were reliable and obedient citizens. They would continue to hone their skills through basic formation drills, exercises, and other methods of war.

=== Tactics ===
As elite heavy infantry of their time, the Spartiate used the phalanx - a rigid but defensive formation made up of men arrayed in lines, which could number of upwards to 50 men. What set them apart from other Greeks who used the same tactics was their more sophisticated drills. The Spartiate were one of the few who subdivided their armies and assigned officers to lead them, trained to march in step to the sound of flutes, passing instructions through a chain of command, and wheeling or countermarching when in formation. When faced with missile troops, the fitness they acquired from the agoge allowed them to chase down skirmishers and other swift-moving light infantries.

The standard equipment of the Spartan hoplite were the aspis (shield), dory (spear), xiphos (straight sword), and kopis (curved sword). The shield was given much importance in the army, and losing one was a mark of shame for the Spartan army. It was stated that when Spartiate went to war, their wives or mothers would point to the shield and said, "Either with this or on this." The shield was vital to the phalanx formation; large numbers of congregating shielded men created a bronze wall that was near impervious from conventional arms of the time, including Persian composite bows. Most of their other killing tools were made of iron.

The kleros system allowed the Spartiate to purchase and maintain a full panoply of armor compared to other Greek allies, allowing them to use the stronger bronze cuirass or the lighter linothorax reinforced with bronze scales or plates. Their equipment and tactics allowed Spartans to dominate Greece and remain undefeated in battle for 150 years. By the time of the Peloponnesian War, the Spartans attempted to standardized their equipment, such as using the same lambda-designed shields. Throughout their long military history, the Spartans also employed other unique strategies, including false retreating or the "feigned retreat", which worked perfectly in battles such as Sepeia, Thermopylae, and Plataea.

=== Other functions ===
The Spartans also led the lighter and more mobile Skiritai in battle. Like the helots, these were native people of the Peloponnese who were also subjugated by the Spartans. However, possibly due to their military efficiency, and their homeland consisting of mountainous terrain, they were given protectorate status and a standard role in the Spartan military. The Skiritai was Sparta's main missile troops, serving as sentries, scouts, and light infantry. Indeed, the Spartiate did not use much ranged weapons, even finding it "unmanly" to throw one's spear unto an enemy - a belief that was shared by other Greek hoplites. Additionally, the Spartiate also used horses and had a cavalry arm known as the "hippeis", although their contemporaries described the Spartan cavalry as unimpressive.

== Structure of Spartan society ==
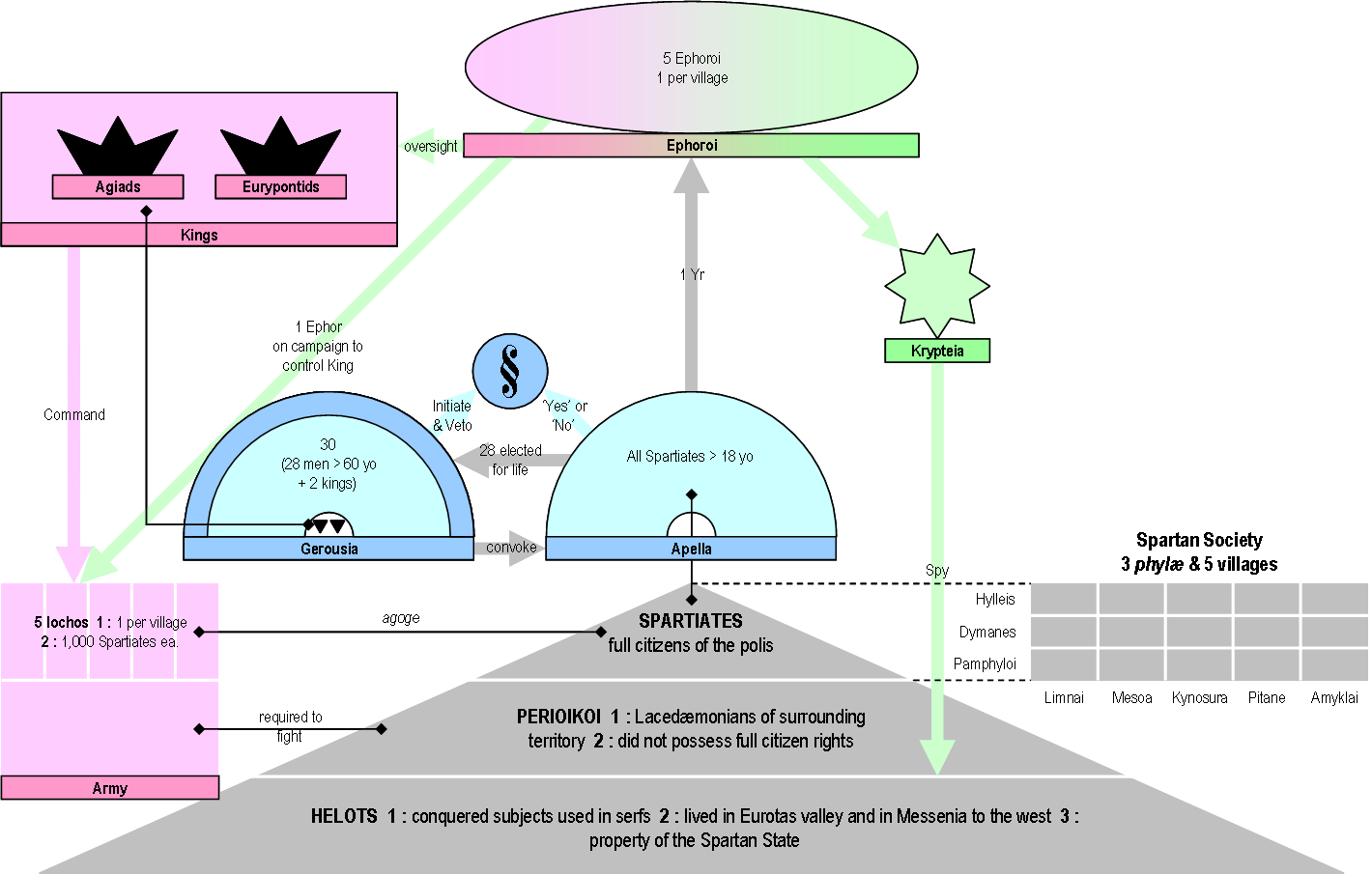
Structure of Spartan society

Spartiate served as the smallest, though also the most powerful, class in the classical Spartan society. Said society was divided into several castes, each with assigned duties and responsibilities. The Spartiate was the class who functioned as one with limited power in the government. Besides the Spartiate class, there were many free non-citizen underclasses. The Perioeci, literally meaning "dwelling around", were citizens of smaller Laconian polises that were subordinate to Sparta.

There were also the Hypomeiones, literally "inferiors", men who were probably, although not certainly, Spartiates who had lost their social rank (probably mostly because they could not afford syssitia dues). The term "Partheniai" seemed to be a similar term as it meant "children of unmarried mothers". This group became noted in Spartan history for colonizing Tarentum in Southern Italy. Additionally, historian W.G. Forrest believed there must be a geographical origin for this group.

The lowest caste in Spartan society, however, were the Helots, who served as state-owned slaves or serfs who worked on the agriculture and other manual labor of the country. Most of these serfs were people from Helos or Messenia that were subjugated by the Spartans. The term Mothax (plural Mothakes) also appeared in the records that may have been tied with helots. They were possibly men of helot origins who were given the privileged to participate in the agoge, and may even earn full Spartan citizenship. In the late 5th century BC, a new class arrived that became known as the Neodamodes, which meant "new citizens". Douloi, who were chattel slaves not tied to the land, also existed; earlier sources conflate them with helots, but later sources distinguished them.

== Decline of Spartiates ==
In the late 5th and early 4th centuries BC, the Spartiate class gradually shrank in number, along with Spartan military prowess. The oliganthropia was evident in many of the battles that the Spartans participated in throughout the years. At Plataea, the Spartiate numbered 5,000 men but at Mantinea their numbers shrunk to 4,200. It continued to shrink to 2,500 by Coronea, and by Leuctra there were only 1,500 Spartiate left. The strict qualifications to becoming a full-pledged Spartiate made it difficult for Sparta to replace lost manpower. The loss of 300 Spartiate at Mantinea was hard-felt, and the nation never fully recovered from the battle.

== See also ==
- HMS Spartiate
- Stratocracy

== Literature ==
- Forrest, William George Grieve (1969). A History of Sparta, 950-192 BC. W. W. Norton & Company. ISBN 978-0-3930-0481-6
- Matyszak, Philip (2017). Sparta: Rise of a Warrior Nation. Pen and Sword Military. ISBN 978-1-4738-7464-0.
- Rahe, Paul (2015). The Grand Strategy of Classical Sparta: The Persian Challenge. Yale Library of Military History. Yale University Press. doi:10.12987/9780300218602. ISBN 978-0-300-11642-7. JSTOR j.ctvmd857x.
- Xenophon. Constitution of the Spartans.
