= Crypteia =

Covert armed youth group in ancient Sparta

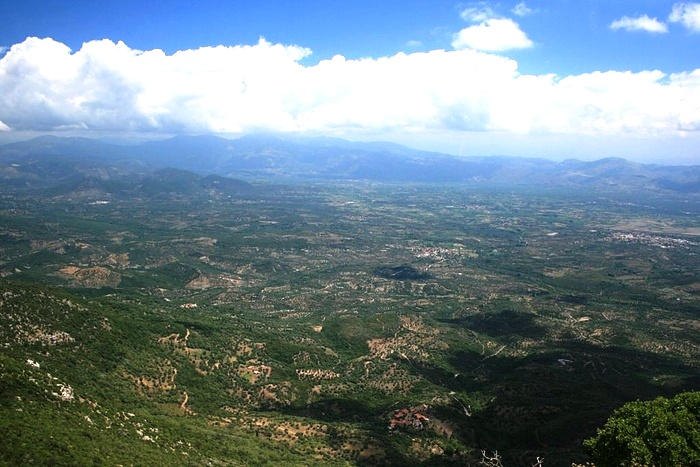
Messenia, homeland of Sparta's helot population, from Mount Ithome.

The Crypteia, also referred to as Krypteia or Krupteia (Greek: κρυπτεία krupteía from κρυπτός kruptós, "hidden, secret"; members were κρύπται kryptai), was an ancient Spartan state institution. The kryptai either principally sought out and killed helots across Laconia and Messenia as part of a policy of terrorising and intimidating the enslaved population; practiced a form of military training; endured hardships as an initiation ordeal; or served a combination of all these purposes, possibly varying over time. Whatever its true nature, the Crypteia was an element of the Spartan state's child-rearing system for upper-class males.

Modern historians often translate "Krypteia" as "secret police" or "secret service", but its precise structure is debated.

== Overview ==
Much of the debate surrounding the Crypteia comes from the differing accounts provided by the few surviving Classical texts that mention the Crypteia, and the fact that Xenophon's Constitution of the Lacedaemonians makes no mention of it.

Plutarch and Heraclides Lembus, both of whom may be using a lost work by Aristotle as a source, and some scholars, such as Henri-Alexandre Wallon (1812–1904), saw the Crypteia as a kind of secret police – a state security force organised by the ruling class of Sparta to patrol the Laconian countryside and terrorise the helots, by carrying out secret killings. Others, including Hermann Köchly (1815–1876) and Wilhelm Wachsmuth (1784–1866), saw it as a form of military training similar to the Athenian ephebia.

The ranks of the Crypteia comprised young upper-class Spartan men, probably between the ages of 21 and 30, possibly selected as "those judged to have the most intelligence". The men were known as hêbôntes, one of the many social categories that preceded full Spartiate citizenship, and had completed their rearing at the agoge with such success that Spartan officials marked them out as potential future leaders.

According to Plato, the kryptai did not use footwear during the winter and slept without shelter. Plato describes them as being unsupervised and as depending on themselves alone for survival. Plato's description might seem to imply that the kryptai were forced to be independent, but some scholars think that they may have had attendants at certain times to watch over them.

The duration of service in the Crypteia is also largely unknown. It has been suggested that one year of service may have been all that was required of the men, based on a scholion of Plato's Laws (see below).

== History and function ==
According to Aristotle, the Crypteia were established by the legendary Spartan lawgiver Lycurgus. There is no known date associated with its establishment. Every autumn, Spartan ephors would declare war on the helot population, which would allow them to headhunt helots without fear of punishment. The chosen kryptai were then sent out into the countryside armed with daggers with the instructions to kill any helot they encountered travelling the roads and tending to fields they deemed too plentiful. They were specifically told to kill the strongest and to take any food they needed.

The reason for adopting that practice may have been to reduce the repressed aggression of the hêbôntes. However, it is most commonly thought to have been adopted to prevent the threat of a helot rebellion and to keep their population in check. According to some sources, kryptai would stalk the helot villages and surrounding countryside, spying on the servile population. Their mission was to prevent and to suppress unrest and rebellion.

Another point of contestation is the time of day at which the Crypteia operated. Plato described their movement as travelling in both day and night. Plutarch states that they would hide during the day and travel by night, aiming to kill any helots who they came across. That suggests that helots may have had to comply with curfew laws put into place by the Spartans.

Troublesome helots could be summarily executed. Such brutal repression of the helots permitted the Spartan elite to successfully control the servile agrarian population. It may also have contributed to the Spartans' reputation for stealth, since a kryptēs (κρύπτης) who got caught was punished by whipping.

Aristotle's lost account was partly disbelieved by Plutarch, several centuries later. Plutarch, who provides much of what is known of Aristotle's account, was not convinced that Lykourgos would have included such harsh customs within the Spartan constitution and instead thought that the Crypteia had been introduced, if at all, only after the helot revolt, brought on by an earthquake in Sparta in the mid-460s BC. In events preceding the ten-year conflict between the Spartans and the Messenians that resulted from the helot revolt, the Spartan leadership covertly killed two thousand helots who had participated in the war. It is thought that the Crypteia were the primary perpetrators of the massacre or were at least somehow involved in carrying it out.

=== Military affiliation ===
In Cleomenes, Plutarch describes the Crypteia as being a unit of the Spartan army. The Crypteia did not act in a similar fashion to hoplite soldiers. Hoplite soldiers were armored and acted as a part of a phalanx. Members of the Crypteia acted on their own, often rested during the day, and were most likely unarmored and armed with only a dagger. During the Battle of Sellasia, the Spartan king Cleomenes III "called Damoteles, the commander of the Crypteia, and ordered him to observe and find out how matters stood in the rear and on the flanks of his army".

Scholars have speculated on the function of the Crypteia as a part of the army, because Plutarch's account provides a completely different understanding of their role when compared to the accounts provided by Aristotle and Plato. Plutarch's account has led to the Cryptiea being described as a reconnaissance, special operations or even military police force. Jean Ducat argues that source should no longer be associated with the understanding of the Crypteia as known from Aristotle and Plato. He proposes that the understanding of the Crypteia as part of the army is just that, a separate understanding that defines the Crypteia as a corps in the Spartan army.

Plutarch's account of the Crypteia describes the organisation as a military unit that has a commander, which differs from Aristotle and Plato's interpretation since the Crypteia is described as being independent and without overseers. Ducat also takes up query with the task of observation that the Crypteia are given in Plutarch's account. Again, that differs from Aristotle and Plato's interpretation in the fact that the Crypteia's mandate was not to observe or provide intelligence but to seek out purposely and kill helots.

The Battle of Sellasia is considered to provide a potential date for the disbandment of the Crypteia. With the Spartan revolution in jeopardy, Cleomenes III began to emancipate helots in exchange for money and then military service. With the emancipation of many helots and Spartan's defeat at Sellasia, helotage ceased to exist. Without a helot population, by mandate, the Crypteia should have ceased to exist as well. The Crypteia's disbanding after that battle, however, is only speculation.

=== Ritualistic activity ===
The French historian Henri Jeanmaire points out that the unstructured and covert activities of the Crypteia are unlike the disciplined and well-ordered communal life of the Spartan hoplites (see Homonoia). Jeanmaire suggests that the Crypteia was a rite of passage, possibly predating the classical military organization, and may have been preserved through Sparta's legendary religious conservatism. He draws comparison with the initiation rituals of some African secret societies, of wolf-men and leopard men. Members of the Crypteia may have not shared the commonality with Spartan hoplites that Jeanmaire describes during their service as a part of the institution, but they eventually returned to their communities and were integrated back into the complex Spartan social system.

== Classical sources ==
Several surviving classical sources, from several different centuries, describe, or mention, or at least are thought by some Classicists to reference the Crypteia.

=== 5th century BC ===
Herodotus is thought by some to have been referring to the Crypteia when he writes "Now the Lacedemonians put to death by night all those whom they put to death, but no man by day."

Thucydides is also thought by some to be referring to the Crypteia when he writes, in his account of the eighth year of the Peloponnesian War,

The Lacedaemonians were also glad to have an excuse for sending some of the Helots out of the country, for fear that the present aspect of affairs and the occupation of Pylos might encourage them to move. Indeed fear of their numbers and obstinacy even persuaded the Lacedaemonians to the action which I shall now relate, their policy at all times having been governed by the necessity of taking precautions against them. The Helots were invited by a proclamation to pick out those of their number who claimed to have most distinguished themselves against the enemy, in order that they might receive their freedom; the object being to test them, as it was thought that the first to claim their freedom would be the most high-spirited and the most apt to rebel. As many as two thousand were selected accordingly, who crowned themselves and went round the temples, rejoicing in their new freedom. The Spartans, however, soon afterwards did away with them, and no one ever knew how each of them perished.

— Thuc 4.80, History of the Peloponnesian War, by Thucydides, book four, section 80. Translated by Richard Crawley

Centuries later, Plutarch mentions Thucydides's account, immediately after speaking explicitly of the Crypteia (see below).

=== 4th century BC ===
There is a single-sentence passing reference to the Crypteia, made by an imaginary Spartan in a fictional dialogue, in Plato's Laws

moreover, the "Crypteia",^{1} as it is called, affords a wonderfully severe training in hardihood, as the men go bare-foot in winter and sleep without coverlets and have no attendants, but wait on themselves and rove through the whole countryside both by night and by day.
[citation in translation reads:] 1 Or "Secret Service". Young Spartans policed the country to suppress risings among the Helots.

— Plato's Laws 633b, translation from Plato's Laws, Plato in Twelve Volumes, Vols. 10 & 11 translated by R.G. Bury. Cambridge, MA, Harvard University Press; London, William Heinemann Ltd. 1967 & 1968.

There is also a scholion on this text.

=== 2nd century BC ===
A fragment by the Alexandrian Heraclides Lembus (Heraclides fr. 10 Dilts) mentions the Krypteia, probably describing it as instituted by Lycurgus:

It is said that he ... also set up the [k]rypteia, whereby, even to this day, men go out of the city to hide by day, and by night in arms [...] and slaughter helots as they think necessary.

— Heraclides fr. 10 Dilts. Translation Ducat 2006, p. 284

Heraclides may, like Plutarch, below, be using a lost work of Aristotle as a source.

=== 1st century AD ===
Plutarch, in his Life of Lycurgus, gives a long description of the Crypteia.

The Cryptia, perhaps (if it were one of Lycurgus's ordinances, as Aristotle says it was), gave both him and Plato, too, this [negative] opinion alike of the lawgiver and his government. By this ordinance, the magistrates despatched privately some of the ablest of the young men [ νέων, néon ] into the country, from time to time, armed only with their daggers, and taking a little necessary provision with them; in the daytime, they hid themselves in out-of-the-way places, and there lay close, but, in the night, issued out into the highways, and killed all the Helots they could light upon; sometimes they set upon them by day, as they were at work in the fields, and murdered them. As, also, Thucydides, in his history of the Peloponnesian war, tells us, that a good number of them, after being singled out for their bravery by the Spartans, garlanded, as enfranchised persons, and led about to all the temple in token of honors, shortly after disappeared all of a sudden, being about the number of two thousand; and no man either then or since could give an account how they came by their deaths. And Aristotle, in particular, adds, that the ephori, so soon as they were entered into their office, used to declare war against them, that they might be massacred without a breach of religion. It is confessed, on all hands, that the Spartans dealt with them very hardly

— Plut. Lyc. 28.2, Plutarch's Life of Lycurgus, 1859 translation

There is another possible reference to the Crypteia, or at least to a man who was commander of it at the time of the Battle of Sellasia, in Plutarch's Lives:

He [the Spartan king Cleomenes III] therefore called Damoteles, the commander of the secret service contingent,^{1}[καλέσας δὲ Δαμοτέλη τὸνἐπὶ τῆς κρυπτείας τεταγμένον] and ordered him to observe and find out how matters stood in the rear and on the flanks of his array. But Damoteles (who had previously been bribed, as we are told, by Antigonus) told him to have no concern about flanks and rear, for all was well there, but to give his attention to those who assailed him in front, and repulse them.
[footnote in translation:] 1 A rural police with the special duty of watching the Helots, or slave population.

— Plut. Cleo. 28.3, Plutarch. Plutarch's Lives. Translation by Bernadotte Perrin, 1921. 1859 translation)

== Modern reception ==
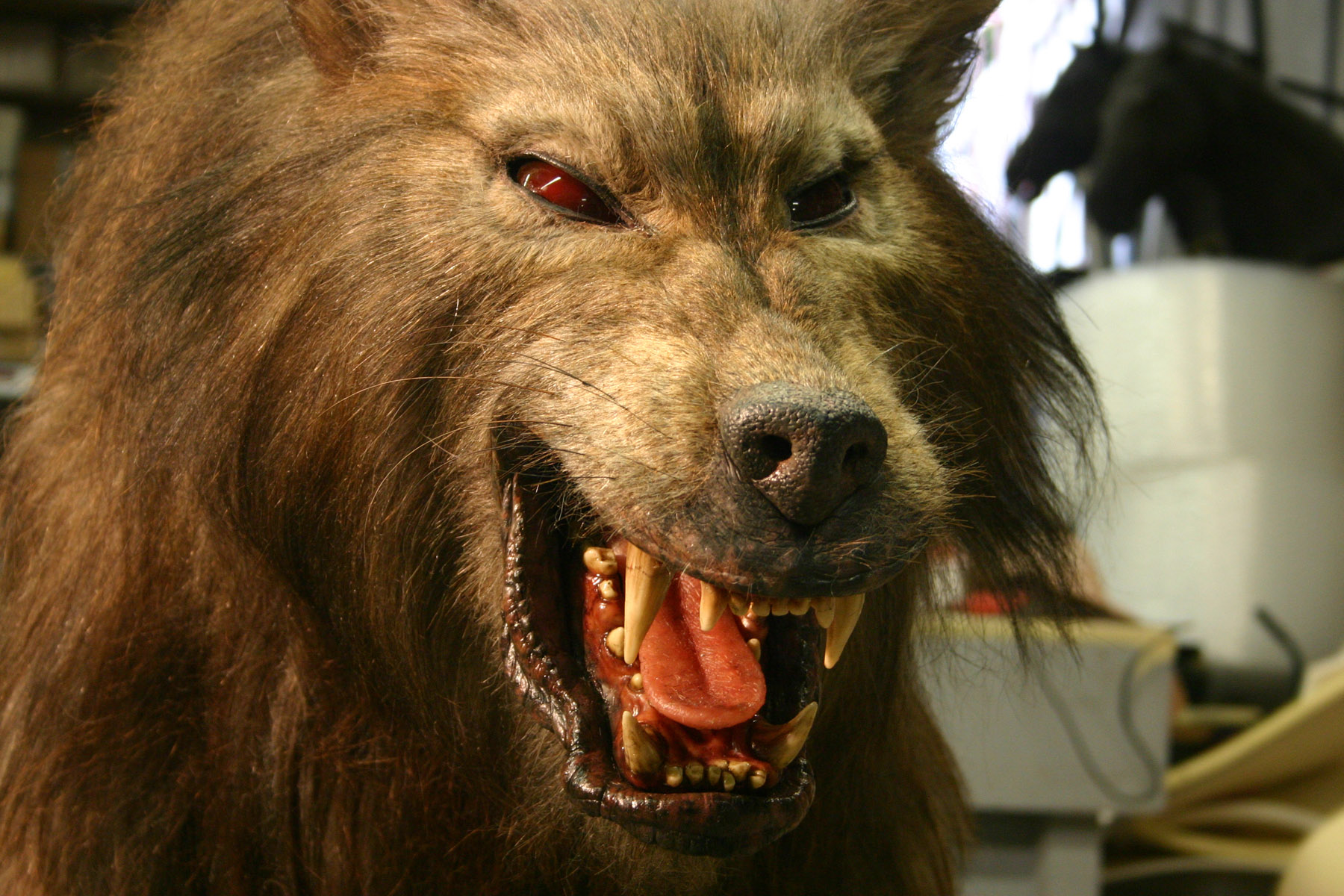
The film 300 has the protagonist, as a rite of passage, hunt and kill this animatronic wolf, instead of an unarmed slave.

=== In popular culture ===
The Crypteia (as The Krypteia) are key to the indie horror film Pledge, which brings the Greek secret society to the modern world fronting as a fraternity preying on new freshman pledges.

The Crypteia are briefly mentioned in the comic book series Three by Kieron Gillen. They make their first appearance in issue one of Three and are depicted naked, armed with only daggers, attacking a group of unsuspecting helots as they tend to their crops. Gillien used the Crypteia to highlight the harshness of the Spartan system and describes their function as "a rite of passage to life where all vocations are barred, bar one. Once a year, the masters declare war on the helots. If they bloody their hands, they are not polluted. So they are free to do whatever is required to keep the helots on their knees. And so they do."

One of Sparta's leading historians, Stephen Hodkinson, is noted as being the historical consultant employed by Gillen throughout the series. Hodkinson describes Gillien's depiction of the Crypteia as a "perfect amalgam" of the information available in the two source traditions; those being Plato's Laws and Plutarch's Life of Lycurgus.

The reason for this, according to Hokinson, is that these two sources portray the Crypteia in different, almost contradictory, ways. Aristotle's account, which is taken from Plutarch, depicts kryptai hunting helots, while Plato's account does not mention the killing of helots and views the Crypteia as a mode of endurance training. Hodkinson claims that the differing accounts have led modern scholars to adopt a "composite" understanding of the Crypteia.

The Krypteia are also mentioned in the book Gates of Fire. They are described as being a "secret society among the peers (full citizens)". They also are described as being assassins and being "pitiless as iron". The author also mentions that they are the youngest and the strongest of the Spartan military.

=== Spartan Race ===
Spartan Race, the obstacle course racing series, calls their event leaders the "Krypteia".

=== Golden Dawn ===
Maniot leaders of the far-right Greek political party, Golden Dawn, reinstituted the Crypteia as a part of their adoption of Spartan ideologies.

== See also ==
- United States Military Academy
- FBI Academy
- The Farm
- Federal Law Enforcement Training Centers
- Royal Military Academy Sandhurst
- Royal Military Academy, Woolwich
- Frunze Military Academy
- Sparrow School
- Agoge
- Kóryos

== Sources ==
- Cartledge, Paul (2001), Spartan Reflections, London: Duckworth, ISBN 0-7156-2966-2
