= Helots =

Subjugated population in ancient Sparta

The helots (/ˈhɛləts, ˈhiːləts/; Greek: εἵλωτες, heílotes) were a subjugated group that constituted a majority of the population of Laconia and Messenia – the territories ruled by Sparta in Ancient Greece. There has been controversy since antiquity as to their exact characteristics, such as whether they constituted an Ancient Greek tribe, a social class, or both. For example, Critias described helots as "slaves to the utmost", whereas according to Pollux, they occupied a status "between free men and slaves". Tied to the land, they primarily worked in agriculture as a majority and economically supported the Spartan citizens.

The proportion of helots in relation to Spartan citizens varied throughout the history of the Spartan state; according to Herodotus, there were seven helots for each of the 5,000 Spartan soldiers at the time of the Battle of Plataea in 479 BC. Thus the need to keep the helot population in check and to prevent rebellion were major concerns of the Spartans. Helots were ritually mistreated and humiliated. Every autumn the Spartan polis declared war on the helots, allowing them to be killed and abused by members of the Crypteia without fear of religious repercussion. Uprisings and attempts to improve the lot of the helots did occur, such as the conspiracy of Cinadon of 399 BC. Plato on the other hand does not mention the killings by the Crypteia at all in Laws. The population was largely liberated by the Theban commander Epaminondas following the Theban-Spartan War.

== Etymology ==
Several theories exist regarding the origin of the name "helot". According to Hellanicus, the word relates to the village of Helos, in the south of Sparta. Pausanias thus states, "Its inhabitants became the first slaves of the Lacedaemonian state, and were the first to be called helots". This explanation is, however, not very plausible in etymological terms.

Linguists have associated the word with the root ϝελ-, wel-, as in ἁλίσκομαι, halískomai, "to be captured, to be made prisoner". In fact, some ancient authors did not consider the term ethnic, but rather an indication of servitude: Antiochus of Syracuse writes: "those of the Lacedaemonians who did not take part in the expedition were adjudged slaves and were named helots", while Theopompus (fragment 122), cited by Athenaeus (VI, 416c), states, "...and the one nation called their slaves helots and the others called them penestae..." "In all of these texts, the naming of the group as helots is the central and symbolic moment of their reduction to serfhood. They are thus institutionally distinguished from the anonymous douloi (slaves)."

Certainly conquest comprised one aspect of helotism; thus Messenians, who were conquered in the Messenian Wars of the 8th century BC, become synonymous in Herodotus with helots.

The situation seems less clear in the case of the earliest helots, who, according to Theopompus, were descended from the initial Achaeans, whom the Dorians had conquered. But not all Achaeans were reduced to helotism: the city of Amyclae, home of the Hyacinthia festival, enjoyed special status, as did others.

Contemporary authors propose alternative theories: according to Antiochus of Syracuse, helots were the Lacedaemonians who did not participate in the Messenian Wars; for Ephorus of Cyme, they were the Perioeci ("dwellers in surrounding communities") from Helos, reduced to slavery after a failed revolt.

== Characteristics ==
=== Relationship to Spartans ===
From at least the classical period, the number of Spartans was very small in comparison to that of the helots. In a celebrated passage, Thucydides stresses that "most Spartan institutions have always been designed with a view to security against the Helots". Aristotle compares them to "an enemy constantly sitting in wait of the disaster of the Spartans". Consequently, fear seems to be an important factor governing relations between Spartans and Helots. According to tradition, the Spartiates always carried their spears, undid the straps of their bucklers only when at home lest the Helots seize them, and locked themselves in their homes. They also took active measures, subjecting them to what Theopompus describes as "an altogether cruel and bitter condition".

According to Myron of Priene, an anti-Spartan historian of the middle 3rd century BC:

They assign to the Helots every shameful task leading to disgrace. For they ordained that each one of them must wear a dogskin cap (κυνῆ / kunễ) and wrap himself in skins (διφθέρα / diphthéra) and receive a stipulated number of beatings every year regardless of any wrongdoing, so that they would never forget they were slaves. Moreover, if any exceeded the vigour proper to a slave's condition, they made death the penalty; and they allotted a punishment to those controlling them if they failed.

Plutarch also states that Spartans treated the Helots "harshly and cruelly": they compelled them to drink pure wine (which was considered dangerous—wine usually being diluted with water) "... and to lead them in that condition into their public halls, that the children might see what a sight a drunken man is; they made them to dance low dances, and sing ridiculous songs..." during syssitia (obligatory banquets). However, he notes that this rough treatment was inflicted only relatively late, after the 464 BC earthquake.

Some modern scholars advocate a reevaluation of ancient evidence about helots. It has been argued that the kunē was not actually made of dogskin, and that the diphthera (literally, "leather") was the general attire of the poor peasant class. The obligation of masters to prevent fatness amongst their helots is actually deemed implausible: as the Spartiates lived separately, dietary intake could not be rigorously controlled; as manual labour was an important function of the Helots (for example, being used to carry their master's arms and armour on campaign), it would make sense to keep them well fed. Besides, the rations mentioned by Thucydides for the Helots on Sphacteria are close to normal. Myron's evidence is interpreted as an extrapolation from actions performed on symbolic representatives. In short, Grote writes that "the various anecdotes which are told respecting [Helot] treatment at Sparta betoken less of cruelty than of ostentatious scorn". He has been followed recently by J. Ducat (1974 and 1990), who describes Spartan treatment of the Helots as a kind of ideological warfare, designed to condition the Helots to think of themselves as inferiors. This strategy seems to have been successful at least for Laconian Helots: when the Thebans ordered a group of Laconian helot prisoners to recite the verses of Alcman and Terpander (national poets of Thebes), they refused on the grounds that it would displease their masters.

Other modern scholars consider then, "although the details may be fanciful, [Myron's evidence] does reflect accurately the general Spartiate attitude towards helots". It has also been proposed that contempt alone could hardly explain the organized murder of Helots mentioned by several ancient sources. According to Aristotle, the ephors annually declared war on the Helots, thereby allowing Spartans to kill them without fear of religious pollution. This task was apparently given to the kryptes, graduates of the difficult agoge who took part in the crypteia. This lack of judicial protection is confirmed by Myron of Priene, who mentions killing as a standard mode of regulation of the Helot population. According to a passage in Thucydides, 2,000 helots were massacred in a carefully staged event in 425 BC or earlier:

"The helots were invited by a proclamation to pick out those of their number who claimed to have most distinguished themselves against the enemy, in order that they might receive their freedom; the object being to test them, as it was thought that the first to claim their freedom would be the most high spirited and the most apt to rebel. As many as two thousand were selected accordingly, who crowned themselves and went round the temples, rejoicing in their new freedom. The Spartans, however, soon afterwards did away with them, and no one ever knew how each of them perished."

Thus Paul Cartledge claims that "the history of Sparta (...) is fundamentally the history of the class struggle between the Spartans and the Helots".

=== Helots and klēroi ===
Helots were assigned to citizens to carry out domestic work or to work on their klēroi, or portions. The klēroi were the original divisions of Messenia after its conquest by Sparta. Various sources mention such servants accompanying this or that Spartan. Plutarch has Timaia, the wife of King Agis II, "being herself forward enough to whisper among her helot maid-servants" that the child she was expecting had been fathered by Alcibiades, and not her husband, indicating a certain level of trust. According to some authors, in the 4th century BC, citizens also used chattel-slaves for domestic purposes. However, this is disputed by others. Some helots were also servants to young Spartans during their agoge, the Spartan education; these were the μόθωνες / móthōnes (see below). Finally, helots, like slaves, could be artisans or tradesmen.

They were required to hand over a predetermined portion of their harvest (ἀποφορά / apophorá), with the helots keeping the surplus. According to Plutarch, this portion was 70 medimnoi of barley for a man, 12 for a woman, as well as a quantity of oil and wine corresponding to an amount reasonable for the needs of a warrior and his family, or a widow, respectively. The existence of the apophorá is contested by Tyrtaeus: "Secondly, though no fixed tribute was imposed on them, they used to bring the half of all the produce of their fields to Sparta.... Like asses worn by their great burdens, bringing of dire necessity to their masters the half of all the fruits the corn-land bears." Pausanias is describing the period immediately after the first Messenian War, when conditions were probably more severe. Also, since taking a percentage of the produce would have required constantly overseeing the helots, it is unlikely such a tax could be implemented upon the relatively distant Messenia. With Tyrtaeus being a poet, the amount might well have been a poetic figure of speech, similar to the modern "half a kingdom". In fact, it is debated whether the quote refers to helots in the first place, since Tyrtaeus' description of the Second Messenian War refers to enemy phalanxes, indicating the first war could have ended with the Messenian people becoming a vassal state of Sparta rather than helots.

Having paid their tribute, the helots could often live rather well; the lands of Laconia and Messenia were very fertile, and often permitted two crops per year. It seems they could enjoy some private property: in 425 BC, some helots had their own boats. A certain amount of wealth was achievable: in 223 BC, 6,000 helots purchased their freedom for 500 drachmas each, a considerable sum at the time.

=== Demography ===
Helots lived in family units and could, at least de facto, contract unions among themselves. Since helots were much less susceptible than other slaves in Greek antiquity to having their family units dispersed, they could reproduce themselves, or at least maintain their number. Probably not insignificant to begin with, their population increased in spite of the crypteia, other massacres of helots (see below), and losses in war. Simultaneously, the population of Spartiate citizens declined.

The absence of a formal census prevents an accurate assessment of the helot population, but estimates are possible. According to Herodotus, helots were seven times as numerous as Spartans during the Battle of Plataea in 479 BC. The long Peloponnesian War drained Sparta of so many of its citizens that by the time of the conspiracy of Cinadon, the beginning of the 4th century BC, only forty Peers, or citizens, could be counted in a crowd of 4,000 at the agora (Xenophon, Hellenica, III, 3, 5). The total population of helots at that time, including women, is estimated as 170,000–224,000.

Since the helot population was not technically chattel, their population was reliant on native birth rates, as opposed to prisoners of war or purchased slaves. Helots were encouraged by the Spartans to impose a eugenics doctrine similar to that which they, themselves, practiced. This would, according to Greek beliefs of the period, ensure not only genetic but also acquired favourable characteristics be passed along to successive generations. Tempering these selective factors was the crypteia, during which the strongest and fittest helots were the primary targets of the kryptes; to select soft targets would be interpreted as a sign of weakness. This theoretically removed the strongest and most able potential rebels while keeping the general populace fit and efficient.

What is more, the Spartans used helot women to satisfy the state's human personnel needs: the 'bastards' (nothoi) born of Spartan fathers and helot women held an intermediary rank in Lacedaemonian society (cf. mothakes and mothones below) and swelled the ranks of the citizen army. It is difficult to determine whether these births were the results of voluntary liaisons (at least on the part of the father) or part of a formal state program. It is unknown what happened to girls born of such unions, as they served no military purpose. It is possible they were abandoned at birth and left to die, or lived to remain helots.

=== Emancipation ===
According to Myron of Priene, cited by Athenaeus, the emancipation of helots was "common" (πολλάκις / pollákis). The text suggests that this is normally associated with completion of military service. The first explicit reference to this practice in regards to the helots occurs in Thucydides (IV, 26, 5). This is on the occasion of the events at Sphacteria, when Sparta had to relieve their hoplites, who were besieged on the island by the Athenians:

The fact was, that the Lacedaemonians had made advertisement for volunteers to carry into the island ground corn, wine, cheese, and any other food useful in a siege; high prices being offered, and freedom promised to any of the helots who should succeed in doing so.

Thucydides reports that the request met with some success, and the helots got supplies through to the besieged island. He does not mention whether or not the Spartans kept their word; it is possible that some of the helots later executed were part of the Sphacterian volunteers but later said they kept their word.

Another such call came during the Theban invasion of Laconia in one of the decisive battles of Peloponnese wars. Xenophon in Hellenica (VI, 5, 28) states that the authorities agreed to emancipate all the helots who volunteered. He then reports that more than 6,000 heeded the call, leading to some embarrassment for the Spartans, who were initially overwhelmed by the number. Xenophon states that the Spartans' fears were assuaged when they received aid from their allies and Boeotian mercenary forces.

All the same, in 424 BC, the 700 helots who served Brasidas in Chalcidice were emancipated, and they were henceforth known as the "Brasidians". It was also possible to purchase freedom, or achieve it by undergoing the traditional Spartan education. Generally, emancipated helots were referred to as "neodamodes" (νεοδαμώδεις / neodamōdeis): those who rejoined the δῆμος / dễmos (Deme) of the Perioeci.

Moses Finley underscores that the fact helots could serve as hoplites constituted a grave flaw in the system. In effect, the hoplite system was a strict method of training to ensure that discipline was maintained in the phalanx. The Spartans gained considerable reputation as hoplites, due to tactical capabilities developed through constant training. In addition to this military aspect, to be a hoplite was a key characteristic of Greek citizenship. To introduce helots to this system thus led to inevitable social conflict.

=== A special case: mothakes and mothones ===
Phylarchus mentions a class of men who were at the same time free and non-citizens: the μόθακες / mothakes, who had undergone the 'agoge', the Spartan educational system. Classical historiography recognizes that the helots comprised a large portion of these mothakes. Nevertheless, this category poses a number of problems, firstly that of vocabulary.

The classical authors used a number of terms which appear to evoke similar concepts:

- μόθακες / mothakes: a connotation of freedom, Phylarchos affirmed that they were free (eleutheroi), Claudius Aelianus (Varia Historia, 12, 43) that they could be citizens;
- μόθωνες / mothōnes: a connotation of servility, the word designates slaves born to the home;
- τρόφιμοι / trophimoi: pupils, adopted children, whom Plutarch classified among the xenoi (strangers);
- σύντροφοι / syntrophoi: literally, "they who were raised with", that is to say, milk-siblings, given by Phylarchus as equivalent to mothakes;
- παρατρέφονοι / paratrephonoi : literally, "those who were fed near you", signification rather different from the preceding (this word also applied to domestic animals).

The situation is somewhat complicated by a gloss of Hesychios of Alexandria which attests that mothakes were slave children (δοῦλοι / doũloi) raised at the same time as the children of citizens. Philologists resolve this quandary in two ways:

- they insist on reading μoθᾶνες / mothãnes, as a hapax for μόθωνες (Arnold J. Toynbee);
- the hypothesis that douloi has been interpolated by a copyist who confounded mothakes and mothônes.

In any case, the conclusion needs to be treated carefully:

- the mothônes were young servants charged with domestic tasks for young Spartans during their education (Aristotle, I, 633c); they remained slaves on reaching adulthood;
- the mothakes were an independent freeborn group of helots.

=== Helots as troops in conflict ===
Herodotus makes multiple accounts of Helots accompanying Spartans as servants and soldiers in battles such as Thermopylae and Plataea, often lightly equipped compared to their hoplite counterparts. In his reports on Plataea, he makes multiple accounts of Helots which accompanied the Spartans on the battlefield and made up the mass of the army. In Greek military practice, the standard depth of the army's phalanx was eight men. Having known this, Herodotus concluded that there was a soldier ratio of seven Helots to one Spartan at Plataea.

Historians have confirmed that Herodotus' accounts of both Helot and Spartan soldiers is exaggerated, it is however confirmed that Helots were present on the battlefield due to Herodotus alluding to a grave which was constructed for the Helots. Helots may have also had other roles at Plataea besides forming the ranks in battle; some historians believe that Helots were also designated with guarding supply lines for the armies.

== Helot revolts ==
=== Pausanias's plot ===
The first helot attempt at revolt which is historically reported is that provoked by general Pausanias in the 5th century BC. Thucydides reports:

Besides, they were informed that he was even intriguing with the helots; and such indeed was the fact, for he promised them freedom and citizenship if they would join him in insurrection, and would help him to carry out his plans to the end.

These intrigues did not however lead to a helot uprising; Thucydides indeed implies that Pausanias was turned in by the helots (I, 132, 5 – ...the evidence even of the helots themselves.) Perhaps the promises made by Pausanias were too generous to be believed by the helots; not even Brasidas, when he emancipated his helot volunteers, offered full citizenship.

=== Massacre at Taenarus ===
The massacre at Cape Taenarus, the promontory formed by the southernmost tip of Taygetus, is also reported by Thucydides:

The Lacedaemonians had once raised up some helot suppliants from the temple of Poseidon at Taenarus, led them away and slain them; for which they believe the great earthquake at Sparta to have been a retribution.

This affair, recalled by the Athenians in responding to a Spartan request to exile Pericles—who was an Alcmaeonid on his mother's side—is not dated. Historians know only that it happened before the disastrous earthquake of 464 BC. Thucydides here is the only one to implicate the helots: Pausanias speaks rather about Lacedaemonians who had been condemned to death. Nor does the text allow us to conclude that this was a failed uprising of helots, only that there was an attempt at escape. Additionally, a helot revolt in Laconia is unlikely, and Messenians would not likely have taken refuge at Cape Taenarus.

=== Third Messenian War ===
Also called The Great Helot Revolt, this uprising coincident with the earthquake of 464 BC is soundly attested to, although Greek historians do not agree on the interpretation of this event.

According to Thucydides, the helots and perioeci of Thouria and Aithaia took advantage of the earthquake to revolt and establish a position on Mt. Ithome. He adds that most of the rebels were of Messenian ancestry—confirming the appeal of Ithome as a historical place of Messenian resistance—and focuses attention on the perioeci of Thouria, a city on the Messenian coast. Conversely, historians could deduce that a minority of the helots were Laconian, thus making this the one and only revolt of their history. Commentators such as Stephanus of Byzantium – writing around a thousand years later – suggest that this Aithaia was in Laconia, thus indicating a large-scale uprising in the region. The version of events given by Pausanias is similar.

Diodorus Siculus (XI, 63,4 – 64,1), probably influenced by Ephorus of Cyme, attributed the uprising equally to the Messenians and the helots. This version of events is supported by Plutarch.

Finally, some authors make responsibility for the uprising with the helots of Laconia. This is the case of Plutarch in his Life of Cimon: the helots of the Eurotas River valley want to use the earthquake to attack the Spartans whom they think are disarmed. The intervention of Archidamus II, who calls the Lacedaemonians to arms, simultaneously saves them from the earthquake and the helot attack. The helots fold, but revert to open warfare joined by the Messenians.

It is difficult to reconcile these versions. It is nevertheless clear that in any case the revolt of 464 BC represented a major traumatic event for the Spartans. Plutarch indicates that the Crypteia and other poor treatments of the helots were instituted after this revolt. If there is any doubt in these affirmations, they at least underscore the immediate Spartan reaction: gathering allies and pursuing war with the same Athens that would later be faced in the Peloponnesian War. After all, the rebellion represented an early indication of souring relations between the Athenians and the Spartans. The Spartans spuriously expelled an Athenian army sent to assist in putting down the rebellion, and the Athenians assisted in the resettlement of helots in the town of Naupactus on the coast across the Gulf of Corinth from the Peloponnese.

=== Athenian outposts ===
During the same war and after the capitulation of the Spartans besieged in Sphacteria, the Athenians installed a garrison in Pylos composed of Messenians from Naupactus. Thucydides underlines that they had hoped to exploit the patriotism of the latter in order to pacify the region. Though the Messenians may not have triggered full-blown guerrilla warfare, they nevertheless pillaged the area and encouraged helot desertion. Sparta was forced to dedicate a garrison to controlling this activity; this was the first of the ἐπιτειχισμοί / epiteikhismoí ("ramparts"), outposts planted by the Athenians in enemy territory.

The second such outpost was at Kythera. This time, the Athenians set their sights on the helots of Laconia. Again, pillaging and desertion did occur, but not on the scale hoped for by the Athenians or feared by the Spartans: there was no uprising like that which accompanied the earthquake.

== See also ==
- Classicide
- Sciritae
- Perioeci
- Slavery in Ancient Greece
- Trophimoi
