= Ekdromoi =

Ancient Greek light infantry

The ekdromoi were an ancient Greek light hoplites. The name means 'out-runners', and denotes their ability to exit the phalanx and fight in an irregular order, as the situation might demand. The ekdromoi were mostly lightly armoured (with aspis and bronze helmet) fast infantry and were armed with spear and short sword. The term would actually describe any hoplite who practiced the tactic of ekdrome, that is the irregular exit from the battle line.

Within the phalanx, they functioned as ordinary hoplites, but when ordered, they would leave the ranks and attack the enemy in loose order. Tactical necessities that would ordain such a use would include the constant harassment from enemy skirmishers, clearing a path from enemy presence (so that the army could pass in safety), the fast capture of key points within or around the battlefield, the pursuit of a broken enemy, etc. Their lightness did not guarantee contact with a skirmishing enemy, but they would effectively push the enemy and clear the way. Psiloi and peltasts would never allow themselves to fight in melee with the ekdromoi, since the latter were, even without armor, much better equipped for close combat than poorly armed skirmishers.

Xenophon made use of ekdromoi during the march of the Ten Thousand against the numerous enemies disrupting the Greek columns, as is multiple times attested in his work, The Anabasis.

== See also ==
- Sciritae
