= Epeunacti =

Epeunacti (Ancient Greek: ἐπεύνακτοι) or Epeunactae (ἐπευνακταί), were a class of citizens in ancient Sparta. They were Helots who either slept with the widows of Spartans when Sparta had manpower shortage because of war casualties, or outright replaced the fallen Spartans as soldiers.

During a war with the Messenians, the Lacedaemonians lost many men. Being afraid that their enemies will become aware of their situation, they "put Helots into the beds of those who were dead" (that's why the name, from ἐπὶ (into) and εὐνὴ (bed)). Afterwards, they made those men citizens of Sparta.

In Sicyon, there were people who were called Catonacophori (κατωνακοφόροι) who were very similar to the Epeunacti.

Numa Denis Fustel de Coulanges mentions that there was a hierarchy of classes superposed one above the other in the Spartan society. If the Helots and the Laconians are left out, the hierarchy would be as follows: first there were the Neodamodes (former serfs freed), then the Epeunactae, then the Mothaces (very similar to domestic clients) and then the bastards (who though descended from true Spartans, were separated).
