= Syssitia =

Common meals for men and youths in social or religious groups in Ancient Greece

The syssitia (Ancient Greek: συσσίτια syssítia, plural of συσσίτιον syssítion) were, in ancient Greece, common meals for men and youths in social or religious groups, especially in Crete and Sparta, but also in Megara in the time of Theognis of Megara (sixth century BCE) and Corinth in the time of Periander (seventh century BCE).

The banquets spoken of by Homer relate to the tradition. Some reference to similar meals can be found in Carthage and according to Aristotle (Politics VII. 9), it prevailed still earlier amongst the Oenotrians of Calabria. The syssitia in the Carthginian constitution may have been called in the Phoenician origin "marzēaḥ".

The origin of the syssítia is attributed to Rhadamanthus, the legendary lawgiver of Knossos of Crete. This is explained by Cleinias of Crete in conversation with an Athenian and a Spartan, in Plato's dialogue the Laws. Lycurgus of Sparta certainly made use of the practice in Sparta.

== Sparta ==
In Sparta, where the system was most evolved, they were also called pheiditia (φειδίτια, from ἔδω edō, to eat). The term is probably a corruption of philitia (φιλίτια, "love-feast"), a word corresponding to the Cretan Hetairia. It was a daily obligatory banquet comparable to a military mess. Before the 5th century BC, the ritual was also referred to as the ἀνδρεῖα andreia, literally, "belonging to men". Obligation was total; no person, not even the two kings, could be absent without good excuse, such as performance of a sacrifice. Lesser excuses, such as being away on a hunt, implied a requirement to provide a present to the table (Smith 1870).

The participation at the syssition was, as for other aspects of agoge, obligatory for membership in the Homoioi, the Peers. Spartans were admitted from the age of twenty after a ritual described by Plutarch in his Life of Lycurgus (ch 12):

Each man in the company took a little ball of soft bread, which they were to throw into a deep basin, which a waiter carried round upon his head; those that liked the person to be chosen dropped their ball into the basin without altering its figure, and those who disliked him pressed it between their fingers, and made it flat; and this signified as much as a negative voice. And if there were but one of these pieces in the basin, the suitor was rejected, so desirous were they that all the members of the company should be agreeable to each other. The basin was called caddichus, and the rejected candidate had a name thence derived.

It was also possible for the young man to be presented by his erastes (lover), a teacher figure who was the elder in a typically pederastic relationship.

Each person was supplied with a cup of mixed wine, which was filled again when required, although drunkenness was not tolerated. Following a main meal of black soup (μέλας ζωμός melas zōmos), an ἐπάϊκλον (epaiklon, or after-meal) was served, which consisted of game, fruit, poultry and other delicacies. Alcman (Frag. 31) tells, "at the banquets and drinking entertainments of the men it was fit for the guests to sing the paean". The arrangements were under the supervision of the polemarch.

Each member was required to contribute a monthly share to the common pot, the φιδίτης phidítes, of which the composition has been noted by Dicaearchus (through Athenaeus and Plutarch ibid., 12): 77 litres of barley, 39 litres of wine, three kilograms of cheese, 1.5 kilograms of figs, and ten Aegina obols, which served to purchase meat. That served to prepare the main dish, the black soup, of which Athenaeus noted the ingredients: pork, salt, vinegar and blood.

The kleros, the allotment given to each Spartan and cultivated by helots, was supposed to allow all citizens to pay their share. If that proved impossible, they were excluded from the syssitia. (Aristotle, Politics, II, 9).

The number of members in each syssition remains vague. According to Plutarch in Life of Lycurgus, there were approximately 15 men in each syssition, but in his Life of Agis, the king divides his 4,500 citizens into 15 phidites of 400 or 200 members, that is 7 phidites of 400, 7 of 200, and 300 hippeis (elite Spartan guards).

== Crete ==
The ancient Cretan name for the syssitia was also andreia, the singular of which (ἀνδρεῖον (andreion) was used to denote the building or public hall in which they were given. The name ἑταιρίαι hetairiai was also used. As in Sparta, the meals were for male citizens and youths only. Based on at least one source, however, (Pindar, Pythian Odes, IX, 18), it is possible that in some of the Dorian states, there were also syssitia of young unmarried women. The citizens were divided into messes that originally appear to have been along kinship lines, but vacancies were later filled at the discretion of the members. Ζεὺς Ἑταιρεῖος (Zeus Hetaireios) was the presiding deity.

According to Dosiadas, cited in Athenaeus, each town in Crete had two public buildings; one for lodging strangers (koimeterion), as well as the andreion, where the syssitia took place. The upper part had two tables for foreign guests, tables for the citizen members and a third table to the right of the entrance for Zeus Xenios, likely used for offerings and libations.

Cretan syssitia were distinguished by simplicity and temperance. They always sat at their tables, even in later times, when the custom of reclining had been introduced in Sparta. The entertainment began with prayer to the gods and libations. Each of the adult citizens received an equal portion of fare, with the exception of the Archon, or "Master of the Tables", who was perhaps in ancient times one of the Kosmoi, the highest officials in Cretan poleis before the 3rd century BCE, and more recently a member of the Gerousia. The Archon received four portions: "one as a common citizen, a second as President, a third for the house or building, a fourth for the furniture", which seems to imply that the care of the building and the provision of the necessary utensils and furniture were his responsibility. A free-born woman managed the tables and service; she openly took the best portion and presented it to the most eminent citizen present. She had three or four male assistants under her, each of whom again was provided with two menial servants. Strangers were served before citizens and even before the Archon. On each of the tables was placed a cup of mixed wine from which the messmates of the same company drank. At the close of the meal, it was replenished, but all intemperance was strictly forbidden by a special law.

Youths under eighteen accompanied their fathers to the syssitia, along with orphans. In some places, the youngest of the orphans waited on the men; in others, that was done by all the boys. When not thus engaged, they were seated near to the men on a lower bench and received only a half portion of meat: the eldest of the orphans appear to have received the same quantity as the men but of a plainer description of fare (Athenaeus IV, 143). The boys and the men had also a cup of mixed wine in common, but it was not replenished when emptied. The meals were generally cheerful, and accompanied by music and singing. It was followed by conversation, which was first directed to the public affairs of the state and afterwards turned on valiant deeds in war and the exploits of illustrious men, whose praises might animate the younger hearers to an honourable emulation. While listening to that conversation, the youths seem to have been arranged in classes, each of which was placed under the superintendence of an officer especially appointed for that purpose. The syssitia were thus made to serve important political and educational ends.

Unlike the Spartan format (see above), in most Cretan cities,

...of all the fruits of the earth and cattle raised on the public lands, and of the tribute which is paid by the Perioeci, one portion is assigned to the Gods and to the service of the state, and another to the common meals, so that men, women, and children are all supported out of a common stock. (Aristotle Politics II. 10; Bekker 1272a)

Based on Aristotle and Athenaeus, it appears that citizens received their share directly to pay part to the public table and another part to feed the females of the family. That practice, however, does not appear to have prevailed exclusively at all times and in all the cities of Crete. In Lyctus, for instance, a colony from Sparta, the custom was different: the citizens of that town contributed to their respective tables a tenth of the produce of their estates, which may be supposed to have obtained in other cities, where the public domains were not sufficient to defray the charges of the syssitia. However, both at Lyctus and elsewhere, the poorer citizens were in all probability supported at the public cost.

The principal question is how one building would accommodate the adult citizens and youths of towns like Lyctus and Gortyna. Either the information is incorrect, and there was more than one andreion in larger towns, or the number of citizens in each town was small, a hypothesis supported by Xenophon (Hellenica, III, 3), who reported only 40 citizens in a crowd of 4,000 in Sparta. Crete had similar massive numbers of noncitizens.

== Significance ==
The syssitia patently served to bring kinship groups together. In having those who would fight together eat together in peacetime, a strong bond was formed. The syssition effectively became an extended family in which all were "children of the state". They also ensured a separation between subject classes and citizens and, in Sparta, additional separation based on station and wealth and so were a strong tool for developing nationalism. Herodotus (I, 65) remarked that the Spartan syssition led to troops "who fought with more bravery and a keener sense of shame than would have been the case with chance comrades" (Smith 1870).

While the syssitia, as opposed to symposia, were originally based on simplicity and sobriety, in Sparta, they gradually became more indulgent and luxurious. Some attempts were made by Agis IV to restore former discipline, but they ended in failure.

== See also ==
- Ancient Greek cuisine
- Azoria, Crete (possible 6th century BC andreion recovered in excavations at the site)

== Bibliography ==
- (in French) Edmond Lévy, Sparte : histoire politique et sociale jusqu’à la conquête romaine, Seuil, "Points Histoire" collection, Paris, 2003 (ISBN 2-02-032453-9)
- (in French) Pauline Schmitt-Pantel, La Cité au banquet: histoire des repas publics dans les cités grecques, École française de Rome, 2000.
