= Agoge =

Ancient Spartan education and training regimen

In ancient Sparta, the agoge (Ancient Greek: ἀγωγή, romanized: agōgḗ in Attic Greek, or ἀγωγά, agōgá in Doric Greek) was the training program prerequisite for Spartiate (citizen) status. Spartiate-class boys entered it at age seven, and would stop being a student of the agoge at age 21. It was considered violent by the standards of the day, and was sometimes fatal. Those who survived to the final stage (and around the age of 18 to 19) would have the chance to be selected into the Crypteia.

The agōgē was divided into three age groups, paides, paidiskoi, and hēbōntes, roughly corresponding to young boys (7–12), adolescents (12–20), and young men (20–30). The agōgē deliberately deprived boys of food, sleep, and shelter. It involved cultivating loyalty to Sparta through military training (e.g., pain tolerance), hunting, dancing, singing, and rhetoric. There seems to have been ritual beating. It was intensely competitive, and the boys were encouraged to use violence against each other; by Plutarch's account, this included sexual violence by hēbōntes against paides, while Xenophon says the relationships were widely but wrongly considered to be sexual. Participants were required to live in the open or in barracks, and were restricted from contact with birth families or wives.

Participants were the sons of Spartiates and Spartiate-class mothers (that is, those eligible for citizen status, totalling perhaps 1/10 to 1/32 of the population). Spartiate-class girls (who could not become citizens) did not participate in the agōgē, although they may have received a similar state-sponsored education. Helots (slaves), mothax (free non-citizens, thought to be children of slave rape by Spartiates), and other freeborn boys who did not have two Spartiate-class parents, were also excluded. The firstborn sons of the ruling houses, Eurypontid and Agiad, were exempted; a few trophimoi (very well-connected metics or perioeci) took part by special permission, as did syntrophoi (children of helot mothers adopted by Spartiates).

The word agōgē had various meanings in Ancient Greek and comes from the verb ἄγω (to lead). There is no evidence that it was used to refer to the Spartiate education system until the 3rd century BC, but it was often used before then to mean training, guidance, or discipline. Sources are unclear about the exact origins of the agōgē. According to Xenophon, it was introduced by the semi-mythical Spartan law-giver Lycurgus, and modern scholars have dated its inception to the 7th or 6th century BC. Regardless, the structure and content of the agōgē changed over time as the practice fell in and out of favour throughout the Hellenistic period. In the Roman period, it became a tourist attraction for Romans.

== The Classical agōgē ==
=== Structure ===
The agōgē was divided into three age categories: the paides (about ages 7–14), paidiskoi (ages 15–19), and the hēbōntes (ages 20–29). The boys were further subdivided into groups called agelai (singular agelē, meaning "pack"), with whom they would sleep, and were led by an older boy (eirēn) who Plutarch claims was chosen by the boys themselves. They answered to the paidonomos or "boy-herder," an upper-class official who was tasked with overseeing the entire Spartan education system.

==== Paides ====
The paides were taught the basics of reading and writing, but even the early stages of education focused on the development of skills that would encourage military prowess. Boys would compete in athletic events such as running and wrestling, as well as choral dance performances. Notably, paides were expected to steal food for themselves and their eirēn, and were probably underfed as a means of encouraging this. Stealing did not go unpunished, however, as Xenophon reports that those who were caught would be beaten, a lesson which he claims taught the boys stealth and resourcefulness. There were other hardships too: the boys were made to participate in the agōgē in bare feet, supposedly to toughen their feet and improve agility, and beginning at the age of 12, boys would be given only one item of clothing, a cloak, per year. Plutarch reports that the boys slept together with the other members of their agelē, constructing beds out of reeds pulled by hand from the Eurotas River.

Additionally, paides were educated in Laconism, the art of speaking in brief, witty phrases. According to French historian Jean Ducat, Aristotle believed that it was important that a Spartan learn how to poke fun at his peers, and that he be able to accept the teasing himself.

At around age 12, a boy would often enter into an institutionalized relationship with a young adult male Spartan, which continued as he became a paidiskos. Plutarch described this form of Spartan pederasty (erotic relationship) as one where older warriors (as the erastes) would engage promising youths (the eromenos) in a long-lasting relationship with an instructive motive. Xenophon, on the other hand, claims that the laws of Lycurgus strictly prohibited sexual relationships with the boys, although he acknowledges that this is unusual compared to other Greek city-states.

==== Paidiskoi ====
Ducat considers the stage of paidiskoi as a transitional phase between a child and an adult, where upper-class Spartan boys were encouraged to integrate themselves into adult society. At this point, loyalty shifted from the agelē to the syssition, a common mess where adult Spartiates of all ages were expected to eat together and socialize. Scholars have suggested that one role of the erastes was to act as a "sponsor" through which the eromenos could gain entry to the same syssition. Physical training and athletic competitions continued with an increased intensity.

==== Hēbōntes ====
At the age of 20, a young Spartan graduated from the ranks of the paidiskoi into the hēbōntes and was known as an eirēn. If he had demonstrated sufficient leadership qualities throughout his training, he might have been selected to lead an agelē.

The term hēbōntes means: "those who have reached physical adulthood". It was at this age when Spartan men became eligible for military service and could vote in the assembly, although they were not yet considered full adult citizens and were still under the authority of the paidonomos. Those hēbōntes who had impressed their elders the most during their training could be selected for the Crypteia, a type of 'secret police' tasked with maintaining control over the Helot population through violence. While scholars such as Pierre Vidal-Naquet have suggested that the Crypteia functioned as an initiatory ritual in the transition into adulthood, others, such as David Dodd, believe it was used primarily as a tool of terror. Plutarch and Plato also differ in their accounts of the Crypteia, with Plutarch mentioning brutal killings done by the Crypteia in Life of Lycurgus and Plato not mentioning the killings at all in Laws.

Additionally, 300 hēbōntes were chosen to join the hippeis, a highly-esteemed infantry cohort (despite the name implying cavalry). Xenophon describes the selection process as a public event where each of the three hippagretai (commanders) chooses 100 men, supposedly to instil a rivalry between each group, seeing as each man would be loyal to the hippagrete who chose him and resentful of the other two. He claims that this encouraged the groups to report instances of their rivals' wrongdoing, effectively keeping the entire cohort in check.

A Spartan man could graduate from the agōgē at age 30, at which time he was expected to have been accepted into a syssition and was permitted to have a family. He would also receive a kleros, an allotment of land farmed by helots. Those not accepted into a syssition did not become Spartiates (citizens). They may have become hypomeiones.

=== Purpose ===
According to Plutarch, the main purpose of the agōgē was for Spartan boys to undergo intense physical trials to prepare their bodies for the harshness of war. The competitive nature of athletic events encouraged hard work and merit. However, the agōgē likely had a second purpose: to instil in young children a collective Spartan identity. The agōgē kept Spartan boys away from their families for much of their childhood, which Stephen Hodkinson believes taught them to favour the needs of the entire populace over that of an individual. Since a Spartan man's formative years were spent entirely in a perpetual competition of merit (both physical and social) they were encouraged to conform to the Spartan laws and social norms. Completion of the agōgē also served to define what it meant to be a Spartan citizen: one who had proven his mastery of both physical strength and social conventions.

There may have been an initiatory component to the agōgē, especially in its early history. Training overlapped with ritual activity at the Sanctuary of Artemis Orthia, where paidiskoi were made to steal from the altar under threat of being beaten if they were caught, possibly as part of an initiation rite in the transition to a hēbōnte. As well, the Gymnopaedia festival featured choral and athletic competitions between groups of naked youths, and boys may have been expected to participate as part of the agōgē. Contrary to popular belief, however, children in the agoge were not taught how to use weapons or conduct basic drills, as well as combat sports since Spartans emphasized group tactics than individual combat. It wouldn't be until their membership in the crypteia or at adulthood were they finally taught these military skills.

== After the Classical period ==
The popularity of the agōgē was diminished by the first half of the 3rd century BC, possibly as a result of the declining Spartan population, but was successfully reinvigorated by Cleomenes III in 226 BC. It was abolished less than forty years later by Philopoemen when Sparta was forced into the Achaean League in 188/9 BC but was restored after Sparta came into Roman possession in 146 BC.

Roman Sparta was characterized by a desire to emulate the traditional institutions of the archaic past, and this was mainly expressed through the agōgē. Ironically, the agōgē in this period was almost certainly different from that of the Classical period. For example, there may have been a change in the way boys were divided by age; Plutarch (writing in the 2nd century CE) mentions only two groups: the younger paides and the older neoi. As well, the term boua appears to replace the Classical agelē as the name for the groups of boys.

However, the cult of Artemis Orthia continued to play a role. Cicero describes an initiation ritual where naked boys were brutally whipped at the altar of that goddess, and numerous stelai mention contests of choral singing and dancing which may celebrate Artemis and the hunt. It is likely around this time that a game called Platanistas was developed (although it may have existed in the Classical period), which took place on a small island, and featured a violent, physical contest to force the opposing side into the water. This contest was likely ritual in nature, as two sacrifices were performed before the event could begin. The characterization of the Roman-era agōgē as especially brutal reinforced the opinion of the Roman public that Spartans were traditionally a harsh, warlike people.

== Paidonomos ==
The paidonomos was the magistrate in charge of overseeing the agōgē as a whole. According to Xenophon, the position is as old as the agōgē itself, having been created by Lycurgus at the same time. As the ultimate position of authority within the Spartan education system, the paidonomos was responsible for doling out punishment, but was probably not directly responsible for inflicting it; this would have been delegated to the mastigophoroi, a squadron of hēbōntes armed with whips. Plutarch notes that the paidonomos would observe an eirēn's punishment of younger boys in his agelē, to assess whether or not it was acceptable.

Xenophon stresses the difference between the paidonomos, a free, high-ranking magistrate, and the paidagōgoi (tutors) found in other poleis, who were slaves.

== Reception ==
=== In Antiquity ===
The exact nature of an education in the agōgē was not hidden from the rest of the Greek world. This is evidenced by the number of non-Spartan sources who wrote about the agōgē: Thucydides indicates that the agōgē was well-known throughout Greece in the Classical period, and both Plato and Aristotle praised it as part of an ideal city-state.

Further evidence for this comes from the word trophimoi, which is used to describe foreigners who were educated in the agōgē. The historian Xenophon is a notable example of this, as his sons reportedly took part in the agōgē despite being Athenian. Such trophimoi were likely sponsored and hosted by a Spartan family; Xenophon himself was a friend of King Agesilaus II. This practice likely continued into the Hellenistic Period. Supposedly, Pyrrhus of Epirus hid his intention to overthrow Sparta by claiming that part of his reason for marching on the Peloponnese was to have his sons trained in the agōgē.

Plutarch, writing after Xenophon and during the Roman era when the Agoge was restored, was critical of this education. He wrote that reading and writing were studied only for practical reasons and that every other form of education was banned in the city-state. Plutarch also emphasized the brutality and indoctrination of the Spartan education system.

=== 19th – 21st centuries ===
In the early 20th century, comparisons were drawn between the Spartan education system and the Royal Prussian Cadets in Germany, praising the harsh education as the driving force behind the cadets' military prowess. In 1900, Paul von Szczepanski published his novel Spartanerjünglinge (Spartan Youths) about his education at one such cadet school during the late 19th century. Aside from the name, the book features other references to Spartan training, which Helen Roche believes are indicators that boys at these schools were taught to associate themselves with young Spartans.

In Weimar Germany, after the loss of the First World War, many scholars drew connections with the sacrifice of the Spartan king Leonidas at Thermopylae to justify the deaths of those who died in the war. The mental strength of Leonidas and the 300 was attributed in part to their upbringing in the agōgē. In the 1930s, the Nazi-aligned professor Helmut Berve praised the Spartan style of education in particular for its ability to weed out those considered "unfit" for society and to create a community of unified warriors. He argued that Nazi leaders should use Sparta as an example of their ideal society, ideas which Hitler himself supposedly agreed with. At the Adolf Hitler Schule in Weimar, Germany, schoolchildren were taught that Sparta maintained its power by producing tough, agōgē-educated warriors.

In the 21st century, the agōgē is known primarily in the context of intense physical trials. Spartan Race Inc., an American company, hosts a variety of endurance competitions across the world, the most challenging of which is called "Agoge". It stands as a physical trial rather than a state-sponsored education. In science fiction, Red Rising contains a training program based on Greek institutions like the agōgē in the form of a state-sponsored military education system which utilizes Greek names and symbols; the program emphasizes Spartan discipline against Athenian Democracy.

In the American action film 300 (2007), Leonidas is depicted attending the Agoge as a child and fulfilling various physical and mental trials from fighting other children to being whipped as a form of discipline.

Historian Bret Devereaux has compared the Spartan agōgē to the indoctrination of child soldiers in modern societies as part of his blog "A Collection of Unmitigated Pedantry".

In the Sony Santa Monica Studio Playstation game God of War Ragnarok, the protagonist Kratos talks about his upbringing alongside his brother in the agōgē, noting the cruel and violent methods used to train children and how he looked to avoid doing so with his second child, Atreus.

== See also ==
- Fagging
- History of Sparta
- Paideia
- Spartiates

== Bibliography ==
=== Secondary sources ===
- Cartledge, Paul (2001). Spartan reflections. London: Duckworth. ISBN 0-7156-2933-6. OCLC 45648270
- Christesen, Paul (2017). Sparta and Athletics. In A Companion to Sparta, ed. Anton Powell. John Wiley & Sons, Ltd. pp.534-564 ISBN 978-1-119-07237-9
- Demandt, Alexander (2002). "Klassik als Klischee: Hitler und die Antike". Historische Zeitschrift. 274 (2): 281–313. ISSN 0018-2613.
- Devereaux, Bret (2019-08-16). "Collections: This. Isn't. Sparta. Part I: Spartan School". A Collection of Unmitigated Pedantry. Retrieved 2021-03-19.
- Ducat, Jean (2006). Spartan education : youth and society in the classical period. Emma Stafford, Pamela-Jane Shaw, Anton Powell. Swansea: Classical Press of Wales. ISBN 1-905125-07-0. OCLC 76892341
- Figueira, Thomas (2017). Helotage and the Spartan Economy. In A Companion to Sparta, ed. Anton Powell. John Wiley & Sons, Ltd. pp. 565-595. ISBN 978-1-119-07237-9
- Hodkinson, Stephen (1996). "Agoge". In Hornblower, Simon (ed.). Oxford Classical Dictionary. Oxford University Press.
- Hodkinson, Stephen (2003). Social Order and the Conflict of Values in Classical Sparta. In Sparta, ed. Michael Whitby. Taylor & Francis. pp.104-130. ISBN 978-0-415-93957-7
- Kennell, Nigel (2017). Spartan Cultural Memory in the Roman Period. In A Companion to Sparta, ed. Anton Powell. John Wiley & Sons, Ltd. pp.643-662. ISBN 978-1-119-07237-9
- Kennell, Nigel M. (1995). The gymnasium of virtue : education & culture in ancient Sparta. Chapel Hill: University of North Carolina Press. ISBN 0-585-03877-5. OCLC 42854632.
- Powell, Anton (2017). Sparta: Reconstructing History from Secrecy, Lies and Myth. In A Companion to Sparta, ed. Anton Powell. pp. 1-28. ISBN 978-1-119-07237-9
- Rebenich, Stefan (2017). Reception of Sparta in Germany and German-Speaking Europe. In A Companion to Sparta, ed. Anton Powell. John Wiley and Sons, Ltd. pp. 685-703 ISBN 978-1-119-07237-9
- Richer, Nicolas (2017). Spartan Education in the Classical Period. In A Companion to Sparta, eds. Anton Powell. John Wiley & Sons, Ltd. pp. 525-542. ISBN 978-1-119-07237-9
- Roche, Helen (2013). Sparta's German children the ideal of ancient Sparta in the Royal Prussian Cadet-Corps, 1818-1920, and in the Nationalist-Socialist elite schools (the Napolas), 1933-1945. Swansea: Classical Press of Wales. pp. 32–35. ISBN 978-1-910589-17-5. OCLC 1019630468.
- Scanlon, Thomas Francis (2002). Eros & Greek athletics. New York: Oxford University Press. ISBN 978-0-19-534876-7. OCLC 316719681.
- Stewart, Daniel (2017). From Leuktra to Nabis, 371-192. In A Companion to Sparta, ed. Anton Powell. John Wiley & Sons, Ltd. pp.374-402. ISBN 978-1-119-07237-9
- Tazelaar, C.M. (1967). "ΠAIΔEΣ KAI EΦHBOI". Mnemosyne. 20 (2): 127–153. doi:10.1163/156852567X01473. ISSN 0026-7074.
- Vidal-Naquet, Pierre (1981). Le chasseur noir : formes de penseé et formes de société dans le monde grec. Paris: F. Maspero. ISBN 2-7071-1195-3. OCLC 7658419.

=== Primary sources ===
- Aristotle. Politics
- Berve, Helmut (1937). Sparta. Meyers Kleine Handbücher,7. Leipzig: Bibliographisches Institut AG.
- Cicero. Tusculan Disputations
- Plutarch. Lives. Life of Lycurgus
- Plutarch. Lives. Life of Pyrrhus
- Szczepanski, Paul Von (2018). Spartanerjünglinge: Eine Kadettengeschichte in Briefen. Forgotten Books. ISBN 978-0-332-04519-1.
- Xenophon. Constitution of the Lacedaimonians
