= Pharax =

Former town in Asiatic Turkey

Coordinates: 36°37′54″N 32°37′27″E

Pharax was a town in the borderlands of ancient Isauria and Cilicia, inhabited in Roman and Byzantine times.

Its site is located near Göktepe, Asiatic Turkey.
