= Myron of Priene =

Greek historian of the Hellenistic era

Myron of Priene (Ancient Greek: Μύρων ὁ Πριηνεύς) was the author of an historical account of the First Messenian War, from the taking of Ampheia to the death of Aristodemus. The dates of his work cannot be ascertained accurately, but it belongs in all probability to the Alexandrine period, not earlier than the 3rd century BC. According to Pausanias, he was an author on whose accuracy very little reliance could be placed. For example, both Diodorus and Myron placed Aristomenes in the first Messenian War, which is not universally accepted as accurate.

Most important to Myron seems to be Pausanias IV 6,1 - 6,4. Pausanias wished to reach a decision regarding the age of a certain Messenian War (IV 6,1). Myron narrated the capture of Ampheia and subsequent events down to the death of Aristodemus. At the opinion of Pausanias, Rhianus of Bene from Crete did not touch this first war at all (IV 6,2). To Rhianus in his epic Aristomenes is the hero and he is to him a great men as is the Achilles of the Iliad to Homer (IV 6,3). The Aristodemus of Myron is a bit earlier than the Aristomenes of Rhianus. Myrons history of the Messenian war is in prosa, Rhianus has made an epic. In order to date the Messenian war, Herodot VI, 52 and IV, 147 is helpful, IX 26 - 27 also.

== Sources ==
Ancient sources:

- Pausanias IV 6, 1 - 4.
- Herodot VI, 52; IV, 147; IX, 26 - 27.
