= Aethaea =

Aethaea or Aithaia (Ancient Greek: Αἴθαια) was a town of ancient Messenia, the inhabitants of which revolted from Sparta with the Thuriatae in 464 BCE.

Its site is unlocated.
