= Constitution of the Lacedaemonians =

Treatise on ancient Spartan civilization by Xenophon

Polity of the Lacedaemonians
- Author: Xenophon
- Original title: Λακεδαιμονίων Πολιτεία
- Language: Ancient Greek
- Genre: Treatise
- Publication date: early 4th century BC
- Publication place: Greece

The Lacedaemonion Politeia (Ancient Greek: Λακεδαιμονίων Πολιτεία), known in English as the Polity, Constitution, or Republic of the Lacedaemonians, or the Spartan Constitution, is a treatise attributed to the ancient Greek historian Xenophon, describing the institutions, customs, and practices of the ancient Spartans. The work examines the reasons for Sparta's power and renown, despite the city state's sparse population. There are fifteen chapters: the first thirteen enumerate the practices and institutions that made Sparta great; the last two describe Sparta's decline and the survival of its monarchy. The Polity dates to the period between 387 and 375 BC, and is the only contemporary account of the Spartan political system which survives. Together with Plutarch's "Life of Lycurgus", it provides the most detailed surviving description of the Spartan state, and is considered the best source of information about Spartan women during classical antiquity.

== Authorship and dating ==
The Polity of the Lacedaemonians is included in the collection of Xenophon's works that have survived, and its attribution to Xenophon is supported by a mention to that effect in the works of Plutarch. The consensus of the majority scholarly opinion of the nineteenth and twentieth centuries is that Xenophon is the author of the work. Any imperfections are considered minor in comparison to its overall structure and composition, and are attributed to publication errors and editing by others through the centuries, or even to distressing events in Xenophon's life. Based on the contents of the work, Chapter xiv is dated at c. 378 BC, about the time of the Second Athenian League in 375 BC. The chapters prior to that are dated to within the nine years before 378 BC, i.e. 387–378 BC.

== Motivation ==
In the introduction, Xenophon writes:

But having realised at one time that Sparta, although one of the most sparsely populated of cities, proved to be the most powerful and most renowned city in Greece, I wondered how could this possibly have happened. However, when I perceived the practices of the Spartans, I wondered no longer.

It is theorised that Xenophon's attention was focused on Sparta following a military victory of some sort by that state. It appears that the event most likely to have impressed Xenophon was the victory of Sparta over Athens during the Peloponnesian War, which occurred when Xenophon was a young man. He describes all Spartan laws and practices as deriving from Lycurgus's reforms which were also believed to have been sanctified by Apollo at Delphi. The majority of modern scholars categorise the work as an encomium for Sparta.

== Content and structure ==
The work consists of fifteen chapters, numbered I to XV. In the first thirteen chapters, Xenophon examines the attributes of the Spartan state that contributed to making Sparta such a powerful and renowned city in ancient Hellas. The last two chapters diverge from that focus and concentrate instead on the decline of Sparta, and then on the survival of the monarchy in the declining state.

In Chapter I Xenophon enumerates the parenting methods used by the Spartans to create strong children. Chapters II–IV describe the education of the Spartan children as a lifelong process that starts when they are very young and continues into adulthood. Xenophon explains how this educational process produces humble and law-abiding citizens who at the same time can be daring and ingenious. He also mentions that the Spartans practiced hunting for most of their lives. Chapter V describes the Spartan institutions that produce citizens who are moderate in their habits, possess good public manners, and are physically strong through regular exercise.

Chapter VI explains Spartan egalitarianism, and Spartans' indifference to economic status, as well as their willingness to help those of lesser means. Chapter VII discusses the Spartans' utter disregard for money, their keen interest in civic duty, and their commitment to the freedom of Sparta. Chapter VIII describes the Spartans' deference and obedience to their laws and authorities, and the power of the Spartan government to administer justice.

Chapter IX refers to the Spartan sense of honour, which compelled them to prefer an honourable death in battle to surrendering. Chapter X details how Spartan society promotes good citizenship through public awards, while Chapters XI to XIII detail Spartan military strategy, leadership, and ethos.

In Chapter XIV, Xenophon changes direction, and instead of further explaining the things that made Sparta great, he enumerates how the contemporary state of Sparta has become corrupt, and no longer obeys the laws of Lycurgus. In the same chapter, Xenophon further explains how this decline in Spartan morals and prestige has caused the other Greek states to no longer look up to Sparta for leadership, but instead to team up against Sparta to prevent it from ruling over the rest of Greece. In Chapter XV, Xenophon ends by telling how, despite its decline, the city state has remained faithful to the institution of the king.

== See also ==
- Spartan Constitution
