= Trophimoi =

The trophimoi (Greek: τρόφιμοι, students or pupils, from τροφός trophós food) were children of non-Spartan citizens (perioeci or foreigners), who underwent Spartan education.

The trophimoi were temporarily adopted by a Spartan oikos. The trophimoi sons of Perioeci represented, like the neodamodes and the nothoi (natural sons of slaves and citizens), an intermediate class at Sparta. They could rise to the status of citizens. According to Plutarch, Agis IV intended them to strengthen the citizenry, which had become too meagre for Sparta's wartime necessities.

The foreign trophimoi normally left Sparta to return to their native towns, where they increased Sparta's influence. Thus, on the invitation of Agesilaus II, Xenophon had raised his own sons at Sparta.

However, some trophomoi preferred to remain, and fought in the civic army. That was the case, for example, of the army that Agesipolis I sent to besiege Phlius in 381 BC:

There followed with him also many of the Perioeci as volunteers, men of the better class, and aliens who belonged to the so-called foster-children [i.e. Trophimoi] of Sparta, and sons of the Spartiatae by Helot women, exceedingly finelooking men, not without experience of the good gifts of the state. (Xénophon Hellenica, V. 3)
