= Perioeci =

Spartan free non-citizens

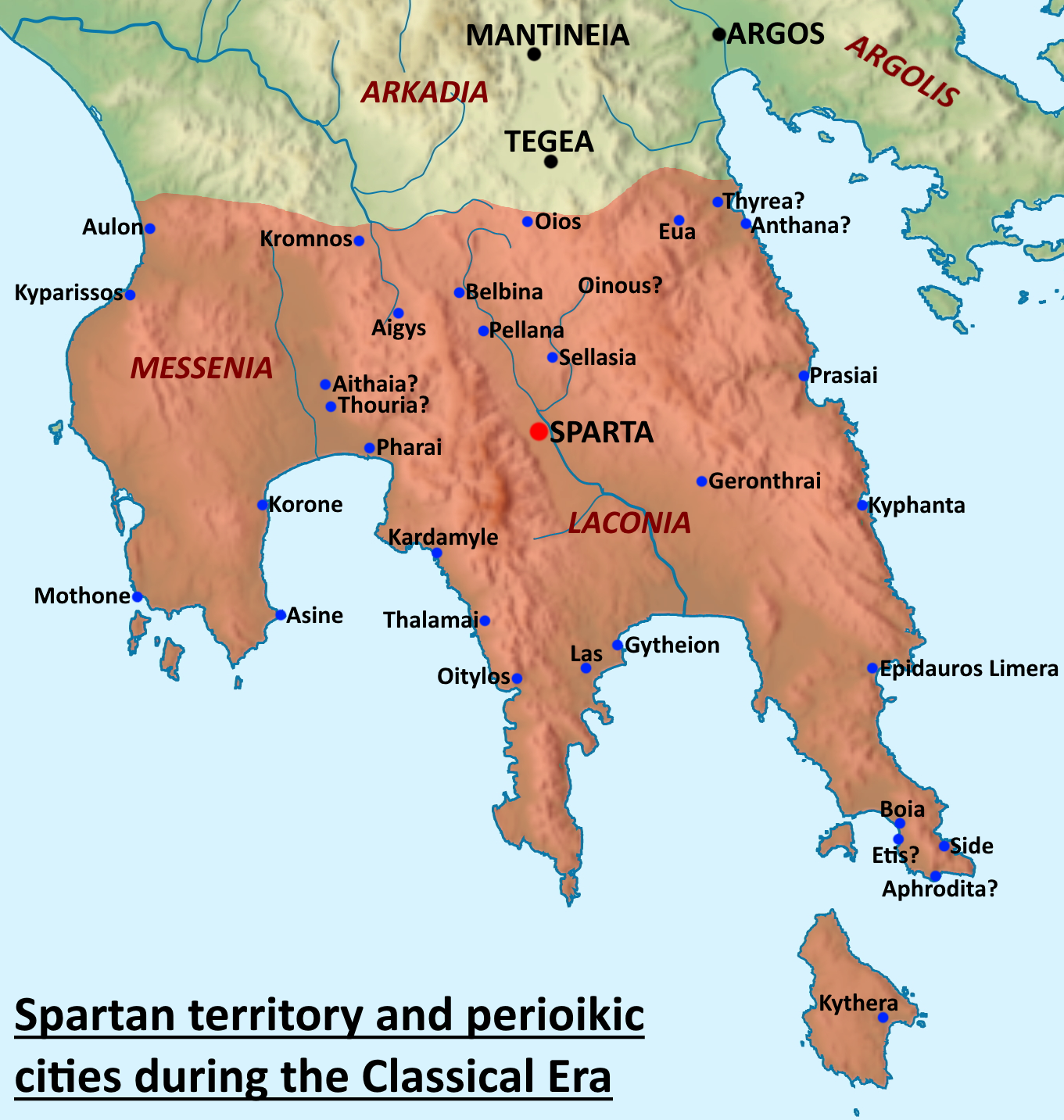
Locations of perioecic cities within Spartan territory.

The Perioeci or Perioikoi (Περίοικοι, /peˈri.oj.koj/) were the second-tier citizens of the polis of Sparta until c. 200 BC. They lived in several dozen cities within Spartan territories (mostly Laconia and Messenia), which were dependent on Sparta. The perioeci only had political rights in their own city, while the course of the Spartan state exclusively belonged to Spartan citizens, or Spartiates.

The name perioeci roughly means "those dwelling around/nearby", deriving from περί, peri, "around", and οἶκος, oîkos, "dwelling, house". Perioeci and Spartans were collectively called the Lakedaimonians.

They had a central role in the Spartan economy, controlling commerce and business, as well as being responsible for crafts and manufacturing, including producing the weapons and armour of the Spartan army, as the higher-ranking Spartan citizens considered all commercial and money-making activities to be unworthy of them. The perioeci were also the only people allowed to freely travel outside the Spartan state's borders, which the Spartans were not, unless given permission. Like the Spartiates, the perioeci owned helots and fought in the army.

Other major cities in the Peloponnese likewise controlled perioecic cities, such as Elis and Argos.

== Origin ==
The polis or city-state of Sparta was formed during the Greek Dark Ages, controlling the plains around the Eurotas river. Those communities already existing in the area which could not be assimilated into the Spartan state, or subjugated as helots, became the perioeci. Whether they were Dorians like the Spartans, or descended from pre-Dorian populations in the Peloponnese, is unknown.

== Status ==
The perioeci were free, unlike the helots, but were not full Spartan citizens. They lived in their own cities in the perioecis, which were described by ancient authors as poleis. These cities were under the control of the Spartan state, but were self-governing on domestic issues.

The perioeci were obliged to follow Spartan foreign policy, and supplied men to fight in the Spartan army. Like the hómoioi (ὅμοιοι, full Spartan citizens), the perioeci fought in the army as hoplites, probably in the same units. The perioeci had the right to own land, which would have been necessary to support those in the army.

In the Classical period, the Spartans were not permitted to engage in any economically productive activities, and so the perioeci were responsible for Spartan manufacturing, including producing weapons and armour, as well as conducting the trade that the Spartan state needed. For instance, the large number of masks and figurines dedicated at the site of the Sanctuary of Artemis Orthia were probably produced by perioecic craftsmen.

Like the Spartans, the perioeci owned helots, which means that the main division in the Spartan society was between Spartan citizens and perioeci on one side, and helots on the other. For instance, in 413, during the Peloponnesian War, Athens made a raid on the territory of the perioecic city of Epidaurus Limera with the goal of triggering a helot revolt against the perioeci. Some helots could nevertheless be promoted to perioecic status by becoming neodamodes after military service, but Spartan citizens could not be demoted to perioecic status; there were specific underclasses for former Spartan citizens, such as hypomeiones, tresantes, etc.

== In Aristotle's Politics ==
The perioeci are mentioned in Aristotle's Politics but in a much more general sense than merely as those within the Spartan state. In describing the ideal state, Aristotle believed that the actual citizens and members of the state should be the rulers, the warriors (those who are allowed to bear arms), the statesmen, and the priests but that those who perform trades, such as mechanics, craftsmen, husbandmen, and farmers should be either slaves or perioeci, because such professions are ignoble and do not produce virtue, according to him. In that sense, the perioeci are meant to be common to all ideal Hellenic states, as a sort of middle class whose ranks the slaves may aspire to join, below the citizens but above slavery. They are free men, but they do not own property and are not allowed to vote, hold office, or influence the state or the laws by any other means. When Aristotle mentions them, he sometimes refers to them as "barbarian" and implies that such non-citizen free men would be non-Hellenic foreigners.

== List of perioecic cities ==
Graham Shipley has identified at least 33 perioecic cities, 23 in Laconia and 10 in Messenia, with various levels of certainty. He notes that many other identified settlements in Laconia and Messenia were probably perioecic, but it is impossible to prove their status with the current state of the evidence.

=== Messenia ===
- Aethaea: perhaps founded in the 8th century BC, it was one of the only two perioecic cities with Thouria to join the Helot Revolt of 464. It was lost by Sparta in 338 after Philip II's campaign in the Peloponnese.
- Asine: founded by exiles from the city of Asine in Argolis who had been expelled by Argos after the First Messenian War. It was lost by Sparta in 338 after Philip II's campaign in the Peloponnese.
- Aulon: the city was lost by Sparta after Epaminondas's foundation of Messene in 369.
- Kardamyli: It was lost by Sparta in 338 after Philip II's campaign in the Peloponnese.
- Korone: The original name was perhaps Aipeia, but the city was refounded by a Theban oecist after Epaminondas' foundation of Messene in 369. Some modern scholars however think that the city did not exist before that date.
- Kyparissos: the city was lost by Sparta after Epaminondas' foundation of Messene in 369, but some scholars suggest it only became a city after c. 365.
- Mothone: founded by exiles from the city of Nauplia in Argolis who had been expelled by Argos after the First Messenian War. It was lost by Sparta in 338 after Philip II's campaign in the Peloponnese.
- Pharai: The city was lost by Sparta in 338 after Philip II's campaign in the Peloponnese.
- Thalamai: the city was also listed as belonging to Laconia by ancient authors.
- Thouria, one of the only two perioecic cities with Aithaia to join the Helot Revolt of 464. It was lost by Sparta in 338 after Philip II's campaign in the Peloponnese.

== Named Perioeci ==
Individual members of the perioeci are referred to directly by primary sources such as Thucydides, Xenophon, and Diodorus Siculus

These named individuals include:

- Phrynis; a spy.
- Diniades; a fleet commander.
- Eudicus; a cavalryman.
- Dexippus; a military commander.
- Neon; a mercenary.

== See also ==
- Sciritae, distinct group of non-citizens of Sparta occupying a roughly equivalent social stratum

== Bibliography ==
=== Ancient sources ===
- Aristotle, Politics. Translated by Jowett, Benjamin. MIT Internet Classics Archive.

=== Modern sources ===
- Aref, Mathieu (2004). Grèce (Mycéniens-Pélasges) ou la solution d'une énigme (Greece (Mycenaeans-Pelasgians) Or A Solution To The Enigma). Collection Mnemosyne (Mnemosyne Collection), Paris.
- Cartledge, Paul (2002). Sparta and Lakonia: A Regional History 1300–362 BC (2nd ed.). New York City: Routledge. ISBN 0-415-26276-3.
- Finley, Moses (1985). Ancient History: Evidence and Models. London: Chatto & Windus.
- Hansen, Mogens Herman; Nielsen, Thomas Heine (2004). An Inventory of Archaic and Classical Poleis. Oxford University Press.
- Lévy, Edmond (2003). Sparte : histoire politique et sociale jusqu'à la conquête romaine [Sparta: Political and Social History until the Roman Conquest]. Paris: Seuil. ISBN 2-02-032453-9.
- Shipley, Graham (1997). "'The Other Lakedaimonians': The Dependent Perioikic Poleis of Laconia and Messenia". In Hansen, Mogens Herman (ed.). The Polis as an Urban Centre and as a Political Community. Copenhagen. pp. 190–281.
- Shipley, Graham (2004). "Messenia". In Hansen, Mogens Herman; Nielsen, Thomas Heine (eds.). An Inventory of Archaic and Classical Poleis. Oxford University Press. pp. 547–568.
- Shipley, Graham (2006). "Sparta and its Perioikic neighbours: a century of reassessment". Hermathena (181): 51–82.
- Strassler, Robert B. (2009). The Landmark Herodotus: The Histories. Anchor Books.
