= Sciritae =

Spartan class

The Sciritae or Skiritai or Skioreitai or Skioritai (Greek: Σκιρῖται and Σκιωρεῖται) were a people subject to Sparta, whose status is comparable to that of the Perioeci. Deriving their name from the town of Skiritis, a mountainous region located in northern Laconia on the border with Arcadia, between the Oenus and the Eurotas rivers.

According to Stephanus of Byzantium and Hesychius of Alexandria, the Sciritae were of Arcadian origin. Their way of life was essentially rural: they mostly lived in villages, of which the biggest were Oion and Caryai. Their territory was inhospitable, but was of strategic importance for Sparta since it controlled the road to Tegea, which explains why it rapidly fell in Spartan hands. Their status was similar to that of the Perioeci, but Xenophon distinguished between them writing: "To meet the case of a hostile approach at night, he assigned the duty of acting as sentries outside the lines to the Sciritae. In these days the duty is shared by foreigners, if any happen to be present in the camp."

In war the Sciritae formed an elite corps of light infantry, a lochos (battalion) of about 600 men, which were used as a complement to the civic army. According to Thucydides (v. 67), they fought on the extreme-left wing in the battle-line, the most threatening position for the hoplite phalanx: "In this battle the left wing was composed of the Sciritae, who in a Lacedaemonian army have always that post to themselves alone". At night, they were placed as sentinels ahead of the army (Xenophon, Constitution of the Spartans, xii. 3) and acted as scouts to open the way for the king, whom they only could precede.

According to Suda, they were six hundred men and during the battle they were the first to engage and the last to withdraw.

In the Cyropaedia (IV, 2), Xenophon compares them to the Hyrcanian cavalry, used by the Assyrians as rear-guard.

== See also ==
- Perioeci
- Neodamodes
- Trophimoi
- Ekdromoi
