= Neodamodes =

Spartan military, helot (slave) soldiers

The neodamodes (Greek: νεοδαμώδεις, neodamōdeis) were helots freed after passing a time of service as hoplites in the Spartan army.

The date of their first apparition is uncertain. Thucydides does not explain the origin of this special category. Jean Ducat, in his book Les Hoplites (1990), concludes that their statute "was largely inspired by the measures dictated concerning the Brasidians", i.e. the helots freed after taking part in the expedition of Brasidas in 424 BC.

Their existence is attested from 420 to 369 BC. They were part of Sparta's army and 2,000 of them are recorded taking part, for example, in Agesilaus II's campaign in Ionia between 396 and 394 BC.

The name comes from the words νέος neos, meaning "new", and δῆμος dêmos, meaning "deme or territory". Contrary to what is written by Hesychius of Alexandria, who likens the neodamodes and the Athenian demotes (citizens of a deme), they never acquired full citizenship. The suffix -ωδης -ôdês signals only a resemblance. In truth, the only deme they joined was that of the Perioeci.

== See also ==
- Perioeci
- Sciritae
- Trophimoi
