= List of battles of the Second Punic War =

A generic map of the location and result of some of the war's battles. Scale not exact, accuracy limited.

This is an incomplete list of battles of the Second Punic War, showing the battles on the Italian peninsula and some in Africa, in Sicily and Hispania.

== List ==
- 218 BC
  - Summer: Battle of Lilybaeum – A Roman fleet of 20 quinqueremes defeated a Carthaginian fleet of 35 galleys.
  - Capture of Malta – Roman army under Tiberius Sempronius Longus conquers the Carthaginian-held island of Malta.
  - August – Hannibal conquered Catalonia.
  - September- Hannibal defeated the Gaul Volcae tribe in the Battle of Rhone Crossing.
  - October: Hannibal's army defeated Gauls in two battles while crossing the Alps.
  - November: Battle of the Ticinus – Hannibal defeated the Romans under Publius Cornelius Scipio the Elder in a small cavalry skirmish.
  - December: Battle of the Trebia – Hannibal defeated the Romans under Tiberius Sempronius Longus, who had foolishly attacked.
  - Late year: Battle of Cissa – Gnaeus Cornelius Scipio Calvus defeated Hanno. Iberia north of the Ebro River came under Roman control.
- 217 BC
  - Spring: Battle of Ebro River – A Roman fleet, aided by ships from Massilia, surprised and defeated the Iberian contingent of the Carthaginian fleet.
  - 21 June: Battle of Lake Trasimene – In an ambush, Hannibal destroyed the Roman army of Gaius Flaminius, who was killed.
  - September: Battle of Ager Falernus – Hannibal was trapped by Quintus Fabius Maximus Verrucosus in Ager Falernus, but he managed to escape.
  - Autumn: Battle of Geronium – Hannibal trapped and inflicted severe losses on a Roman army under Marcus Minucius Rufus. The timely intervention of the Dictator Quintus Fabius Maximus saved the Romans from another disaster.
- 216 BC
  - August: Battle of Cannae – Hannibal destroyed the Roman army led by Lucius Aemilius Paullus and Gaius Terentius Varro in what is considered one of the great masterpieces of the tactical art.
  - Late year: Battle of Silva Litana – The Gallic Boii wiped out a Roman army under Lucius Postumius Albinus.
  - Late year: First Battle of Nola – Roman praetor Marcus Claudius Marcellus held off an attack by Hannibal.
- 215 BC
  - Spring: Battle of Dertosa – Hasdrubal Barca is defeated by the Scipio brothers. The Romans raided Carthaginian territory south of the Ebro river.
  - August: Second Battle of Nola – Marcellus again repulsed an attack by Hannibal.
  - Late year: Battle of Decimomannu – A Carthaginian expedition under Hasdrubal the Bald is defeated near Caralis in Sardinia.
  - A Roman fleet under Titus Otacilius Crassus defeated a Carthaginian fleet near Sardinia.
- 214 BC
  - Third Battle of Nola – Marcellus fought an inconclusive battle with Hannibal.
  - Battle of Beneventum – Tiberius Sempronius Gracchus's slave legions defeat Hanno (son of Bomilcar) and, therefore, deny Hannibal his reinforcements.
- 213 BC
  - The Siege of Syracuse begins.
- 212 BC
  - March: Battle of Tarentum – Hannibal, after careful planning and collaboration from the Greek populace, takes the city of Tarentum in a daring night raid. The Romans continue to hold the Citadel at the mouth of the port.
  - May: Battle of Beneventum – Quintus Fulvius Flaccus defeats Hanno.
  - First Battle of Capua – Hannibal defeated the consuls Q. Fulvius Flaccus and Appius Claudius, but the Roman army escaped. Siege of Capua temporarily lifted.
  - Battle of the Silarus – Hannibal destroyed the army of the Roman praetor M. Centenius Penula in Campania.
  - First Battle of Herdonia – Hannibal destroyed the Roman army of the praetor Gnaeus Fulvius in Apulia.
  - The Siege of Syracuse ends with the fall of the city. Archimedes is accidentally slain.
- 211 BC
  - Battle of the Upper Baetis – Publius Cornelius Scipio and Gnaeus Cornelius Scipio Calvus were killed in battle with Hasdrubal Barca.
  - Siege of Capua – The Romans besiege and capture the city.
- 210 BC
  - Second Battle of Herdonia – Hannibal destroyed the Roman army of Fulvius Centumalus, who was killed.
  - Battle of Numistro – Hannibal fights Marcellus once more.
  - Battle of Sapriportis – The Tarentine Greek navy defeated a Roman squadron trying to reinforce the Citadel.
- 209 BC
  - January/February: Battle of Cartagena – P. Cornelius Scipio the Younger captured Cartagena, the main Carthaginian base in Hispania.
  - Spring: Battle of Canusium – Hannibal once again confronted Marcellus in an indecisive battle. Marcellus was recalled to Rome on charges of bad leadership.
  - Assault on Tarentum – Romans under Quintus Fabius Maximus reconquer Tarentum.
- 208 BC
  - Spring: Battle of Baecula – Romans in Hispania under P. Cornelius Scipio the Younger defeated Hasdrubal Barca. Hasdrubal managed to save 2/3 of his army, treasures and elephants and retreat.
  - Summer: Battle of Petelia – Hannibal ambushes and destroys a small Roman force
  - Battle of Clupea – The Carthaginian navy is defeated in a battle off the African coast.
- 207 BC
  - Spring: Battle of Grumentum – Roman consul Gaius Claudius Nero fought an indecisive battle with Hannibal, then marched north to confront Hasdrubal Barca, who had invaded Italy.
  - 23 June: Battle of the Metaurus – Hasdrubal Barca was defeated and killed by Livius and Nero's combined Roman army. Is thought by many as one of the most decisive battles in history.
  - Naval Battle of Utica – A Carthaginian fleet of 70 ships is defeated by a Roman fleet of 100 ships near Utica.
- 206 BC
  - Spring: Battle of Ilipa – Scipio destroyed a large Carthaginian army in Hispania.
  - Mutiny at Sucro – Scipio quells a mutiny in Hispania.
  - Battle of Carteia – Romans defeat Carthaginians in Hispania.
  - Battle of Carteia (naval) – Romans defeat Carthaginians in a naval battle near the city of Carteia.
- 204 BC
  - Autumn: Siege of Utica – Scipio's siege of Utica in Africa fails.
  - Battle of Crotona – Hannibal fought a drawn battle against the Roman general Sempronius in Southern Italy.
- 203 BC
  - Battle of Insubria – Romans defeat Carthaginians under Mago Barca in northern Italy.
  - Battle of Utica – Scipio attacks and destroys a Carthaginian-Numidian army.
  - Battle of the Great Plains – Romans under Scipio defeated the Carthaginian army of Hasdrubal Gisco and Syphax. Hannibal was recalled to Africa.
  - Battle of Cirta – Masinissa and the Romans defeat and capture Syphax.
  - Battle of Castra Cornelia – Carthaginian fleet under Hasdrubal plunders the Roman supply convoy sailing to resupply Scipio's army in Africa near Utica.
- 202 BC
  - 19 October: Battle of Zama – Scipio Africanus Major decisively defeated Hannibal in North Africa, ending the Second Punic War.
