= Battle of Sapriportis =

- Part of the Second Punic War
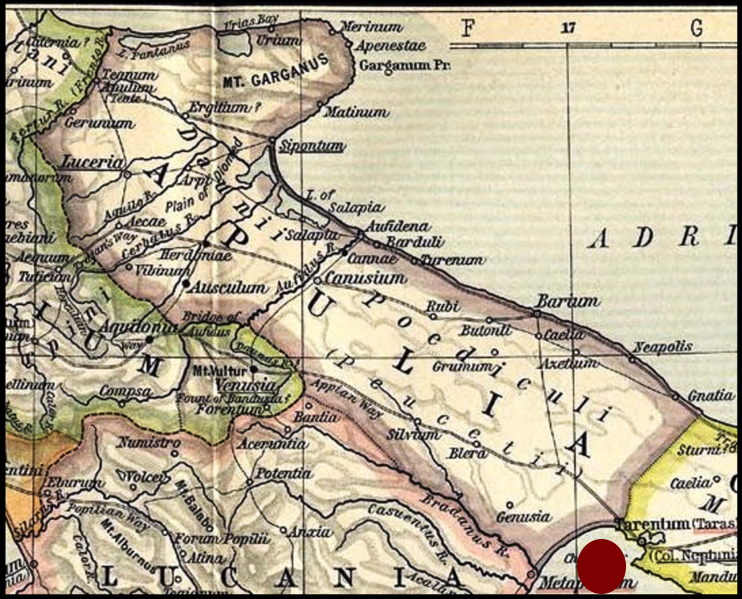
- Sapriportis
Date	210 BC
Location	Taranto, Italy
Result	Tarentines victory

Belligerents
Roman Republic	Tarentines

Commanders and leaders
Decimus Quinctius	Democrates

Strength
20 navy	20 navy

Casualties and losses
Unknown	Unknown

The Battle of Sapriportis was a naval clash that took place in 210 BC, during the Second Punic War, fought 15 miles off the coast of Tarentum, during which the Tarentine fleet, allied with the Carthaginians, got the better of the Roman one.

== Background ==
Here is how Titus Livy describes the particular moment of the war which has been ongoing for eight long years:

There was no other moment of the war in which the Carthaginians and Romans [...] found themselves more in doubt between hope and fear. In fact, on the part of the Romans, in the provinces, on the one hand following the defeats in Spain, on the other due to the outcome of the operations in Sicily (212-211 BC), there was an alternation of joys and sorrows. In Italy, the loss of Taranto generated damage and fear, but having preserved the garrison in the fortress against all hope generated great satisfaction (212 BC). The sudden dismay and terror that Rome was besieged and attacked, after a few days vanished to make way for the joy for the surrender of Capua (211 BC). Even the overseas war was as if on equal terms between the parties [...]: [if on the one hand] Philip became an enemy of Rome in a anything but favorable moment (215 BC), new allies were welcomed, such as the Aetolians and Attalus, kings of Asia, almost as if the fortune already promised the Romans the eastern empire. The Carthaginians also contrasted the loss of Capua with the capture of Taranto and, if it was a source of glory for them to have reached the walls of Rome without anyone stopping them, they on the other hand felt the regret of a vain undertaking and the shame that, while they were under the walls of Rome, from another gate a Roman army was setting out for Spain. Spain itself, when the Carthaginians had hoped to complete the war there and expel the Romans after destroying two great generals (Publius and Gnaeus Scipio) and their armies, [...] their victory had been rendered useless by an improvised general, Lucius Marcius. And so, thanks to the balancing action of fortune, hopes and fears remained intact on both sides, as if from that precise moment the entire war were to begin for the first time.

=== Casus belli ===
In this period, since the famine was becoming intolerable in the fortress of Tarentum, the Roman garrison and its commander, M. Livy, had placed all their hopes in the supplies sent to them from Sicily and, in order to allow the transport ships to safely sail along the Italian coast, a fleet had been prepared at Reggio, composed of about twenty ships. At the head of the fleet and the cargo was placed a certain Decimus Quinctius, born of an obscure family, but full of military glory for many acts of valor performed previously. Initially he had command of five ships, the largest of which, two triremes, had been delivered to him by Marcus Claudius Marcellus himself. Later, since he had conducted all his undertakings with great competence, three quinqueremi were added to him. In the end, the same man, after having requested help from the allies of Reggio, Velia and Pesto, obtained other ships on the basis of a previous treaty, and put together a fleet of twenty ships.

The Roman fleet was met, fifteen miles from Tarentum near Sapriportis, by Democrates with an equal number of Tarentine ships. The Roman commander arrived with full sail having not foreseen the imminent clash that awaited him. Near Crotona and then Sybaris he had supplied the ships with rowers, thus having a very well equipped and armed fleet, based on the size of the ships. And when the strength of the wind began to decline, the enemies appeared. This allowed Quinctius to lower the sails and prepare the oarsmen and soldiers for the imminent clash.

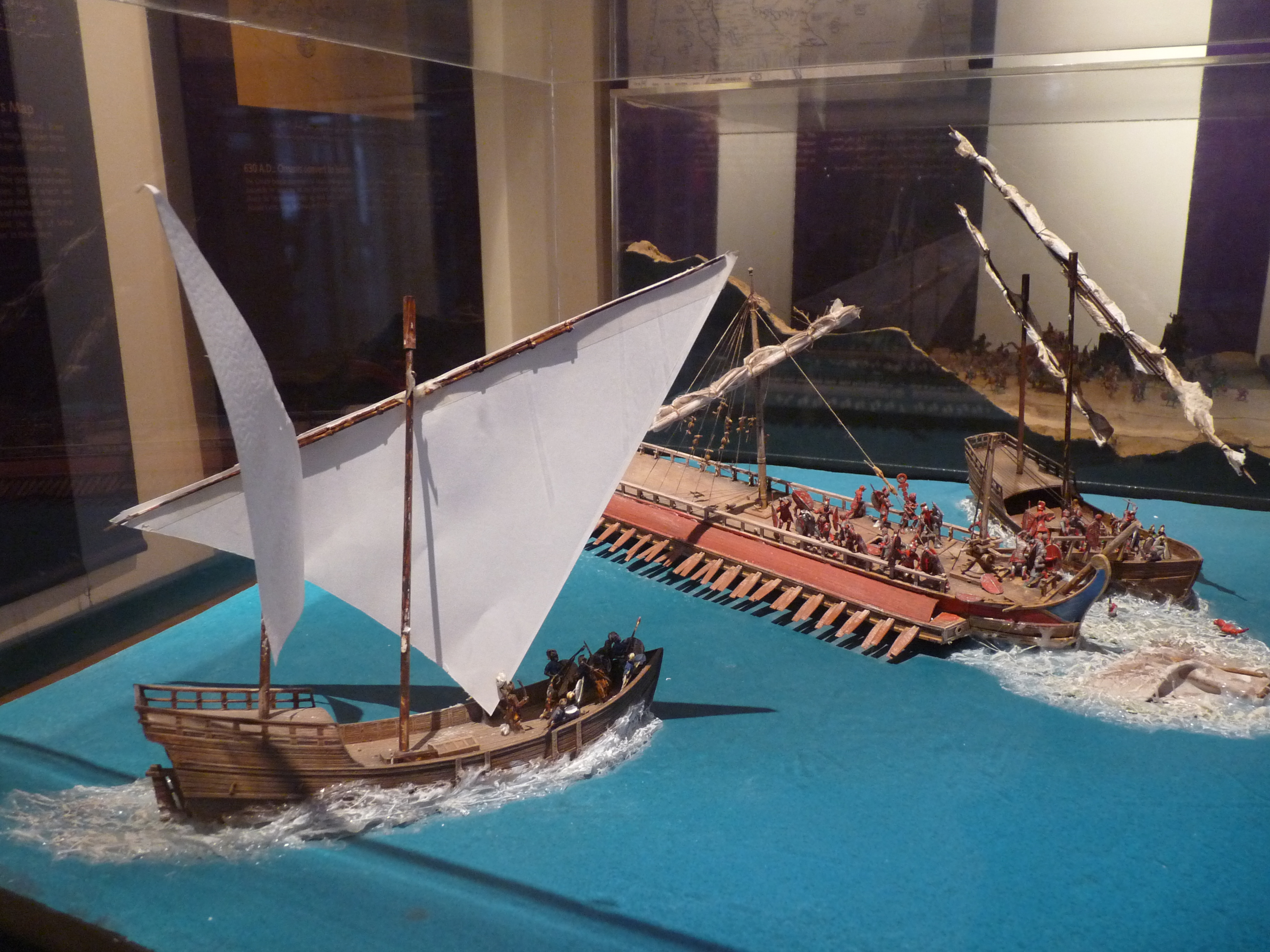
Reconstruction of a naval battle depicting a ship of the Roman fleet

Rarely did other regular fleets face each other with such violence, as they fought to decide a battle whose importance exceeded the value of the fleets themselves.

The Tarentines who, after about sixty years, had taken the city back from the Romans, hoped to also free the fortress, trying to prevent supplies to the Roman garrison, and taking away the dominion of the sea from the enemy with a naval battle. On the contrary, the Romans tried to maintain possession of the fortress.

And so, given the signal from both sides, the ships went to contract, one against the other with rostra. Between them they then threw a sort of iron claw at the nearby enemy ship, trying to board it. They fought at close range and struck with swords in furious "melee". The prows were joined with the harpoons and were tied to each other, while the sterns were turned by the oarsmen of the enemy ships. Thus in an extremely narrow space, barely a few missiles fell between one ship and another. The ranks clashed as if they were in a land battle.

Titus Livy then recounts an episode of two ships which, the first of the two teams, clashed with each other. On the Roman ship was the Quinctius himself, on the Tarentine side a certain Nico, nicknamed Perco, who had always been hostile to the Romans and who belonged to the faction that had handed over Taranto to Hannibal. He managed to pierce the Roman commander with his spear, while he was distracted because he was inciting his men to battle. Quinctius rushed forward with his weapons, in front of the bow of the ship. The victor from Tarentine then crossed over to the Roman ship, whose crew was disoriented due to the loss of their captain, and repelled the enemy, occupying its bow. The Romans, massed at the stern, were having great difficulty defending it, when another enemy trireme appeared from that side. The Roman ship, closed in the middle, had to capitulate. When the other Roman boats saw that the commander's ship had been captured, they were all gripped by great terror, all looking for escape routes to get away from the battle as quickly as possible. Some of these boats were overtaken and sunk on the high seas. Others were dragged towards land by oars, becoming prey to the inhabitants of Thurii and Metapontum. Of all the cargo ships that followed with supplies, very few were captured by the enemy, some in fact managed to move away towards the high seas.

== Consequences ==
Precisely in those same days, the fighting in Tarentum had a totally different fate. While around four thousand Tarentines had gone out to collect fodder and wandered through the fields, the Roman commander of the fortress, M. Livy, ready to seize every opportunity to fight, sent two thousand five hundred soldiers out of the garrison, under the command of Gaius Persius. He attacked the Tarentines scattered and scattered across the fields and, after having caused a great massacre, he chased the few survivors up to the city walls and almost missed the city being taken in that furious assault.

Thus in Tarentum the fate between the parties was equal. The Romans won a battle on land, while the Tarentines won by sea. And the hopes of a supply were thus dashed for both parties.

== Sources ==
- Howard Hayes Scullard (1992). Storia del mondo romano. Fondazione di Roma alla distruzione di Cartagine. Milano: BUR. ISBN 88-17-11574-6.
- Sabatino Moscati (1986). Italia punica. Milano: Rusconi. ISBN 88-18-12032-8.
- Theodor Mommsen (2001). Storia di Roma antica. Milano: Sansoni. ISBN 978-88-383-1882-5.
- Serge Lancel (2002). Annibale. Roma: Jouvence. ISBN 978-88-7801-280-6.
