= Battle of Numistro =

210 BC stalemate between Hannibal and Rome

- Part of the Second Punic War
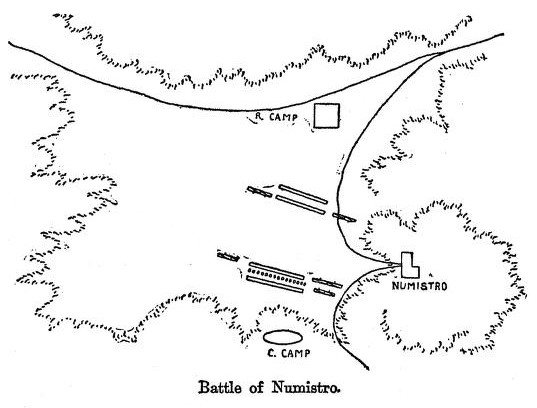
- Plan of the battle of Numistro (T. A. Dodge, 1891)
Date	210 BC
Location	Numistro, Lucania 38.975597°N 16.319791°E
Result	See Battle section

Belligerents
Carthage	Roman Republic

Commanders and leaders
Hannibal	Marcus Claudius Marcellus

The Battle of Numistro was fought in 210 BC between Hannibal's army and one of the Roman consular armies led by consul Marcus Claudius Marcellus. It was the fourth time they met in a battle. Previous encounters were located around the walls of Nola (Campania) in 216, 215, and 214 and had been favourable for the Roman side.

== Antecedents ==
In the early months of the 210 BC, the city of Salapia (Apulia) was betrayed to the Romans, and the Carthaginians lost an important garrison of cavalry. After this, Hannibal retreated to Brutium and Marcellus conquered the towns of Maronea and Meles in Samnium. Shortly thereafter, the Carthaginian general returned to Apulia and defeated proconsul Gnaeus Fulvius Centumalus Maximus in the Second Battle of Herdonia. Then Marcellus informed the Senate he would intercept and give battle against the Carthaginian general to restore Roman honour. His was the only full strength Roman army in the south of Italy at the moment (there was another minor army in Capua with one legion of 5,000 men and an allied wing of 7,500 soldiers), so the consequences of a defeat could have been disastrous for the Roman side and its attempt to counter the invasion in that part of the country. Marcellus moved from Samnium and intercepted the Carthaginian army in Numistro, a town north-east of Lucania. The Roman army encamped in the plain while the Carthaginian camp was on a hill. Numistro was close to Muro Lucano, on a route that the Carthaginian army used between Northern Apulia and Brutium.

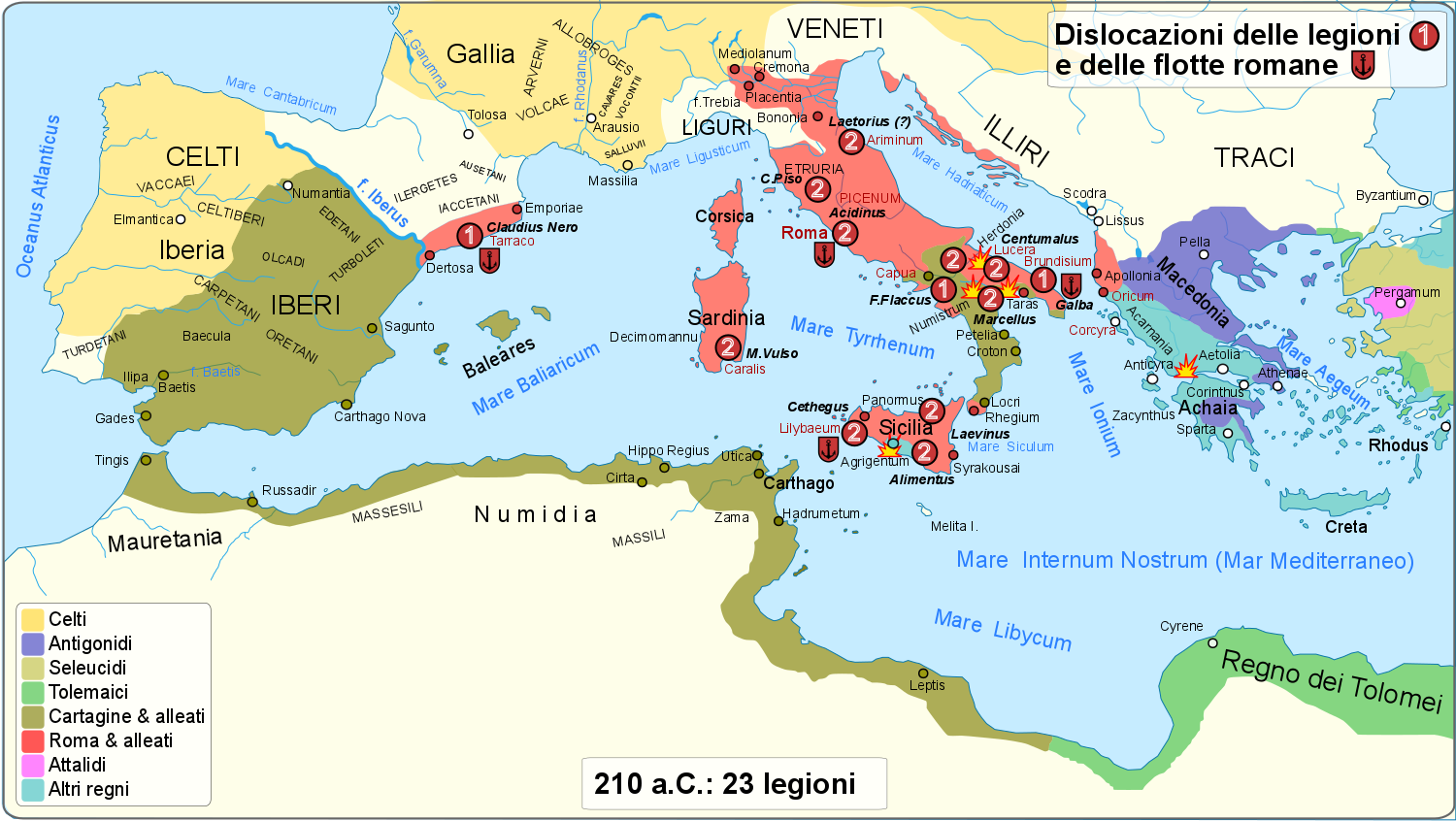
Strategic situation in 210 BC

== Battle ==
According to Livy, the fight started early in the morning. Marcellus put his "I Legion" and "Right Alae Sociorum" in the front line. During the combat both units were relieved by the "III Legion" and "Left Alae". Punic forces described by Livy included Balearic slingers and Spanish infantry, as well as elephants. The battle lasted one day but after a hard fight the result was inconclusive, since it ended due to nightfall, with Hannibal retreating to Apulia the next day. Adrian Goldsworthy in 2004 counted it as a marginal Roman victory. Marcellus left his injured soldiers at the town to recover and followed Hannibal to hunt him in that territory, having minor engagements until the end of that year's campaign. Frontinus said that Hannibal won the battle because he defended his flank with hollows and precipitous roads. Hans Delbrück in 1920 called the battle a Carthaginian victory.

Both generals met again in battle the following year at Canusium. Numistro and Canusium were probably separated in time by no more than six months, as the former happened during the last period of the 210 BC consulship while the latter was in the early months of 209 BC.

=== Sources ===
- Delbrück, Hans (1990) [1920]. History of the Art of War Volume I: Warfare in Antiquity [Geschichte der kriegskunst im Rahmen der politischen Geschichte]. Translated by Renfroe Jr., Walter J. Lincoln, Neb.: University of Nebraska Press/ Bison Book. ISBN 978-0-8032-9199-7.
- Livy "Ab Urbe Condita" XXVII,2
- Frontinus "Stratagems" II, II, 6
- Plutarch “Life of Marcellus”, 24
