= Siege of Capua (211 BC) =

211 BC battle of the Second Punic War

- Part of the Second Punic War
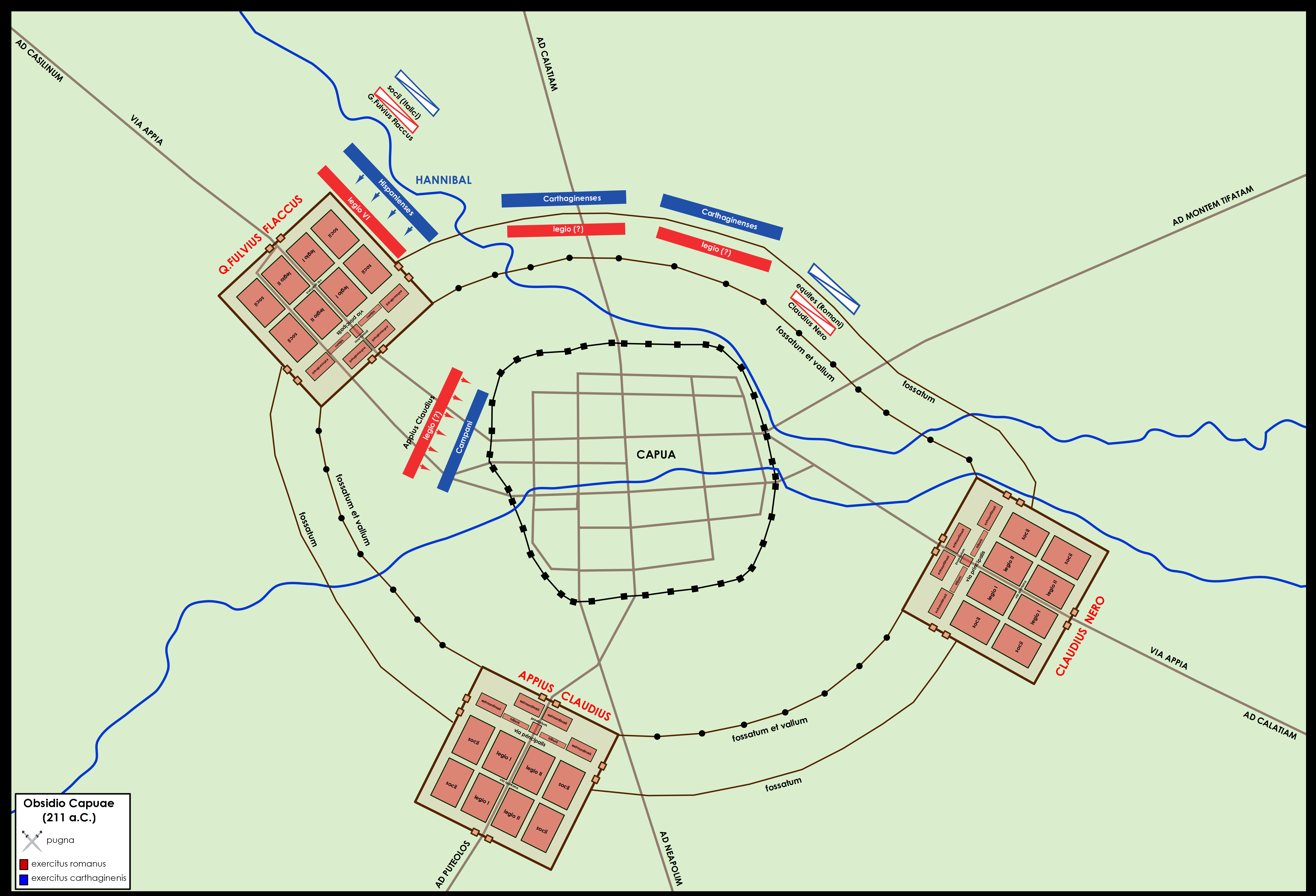
- Hannibal's assault on the Roman siege lines at Capua
Date	211 BC
Location	Capua, present Italy 41.0833°N 14.2500°E
Result	Roman victory: Fall of Capua

Belligerents
Carthage; Capua	Roman Republic

Commanders and leaders
Hannibal; Bostar; Hanno, son of Bomilcar	Quintus Fulvius Flaccus; Appius Claudius Pulcher (DOW); Gaius Claudius Nero

Casualties and losses
Unknown	Unknown

The Siege of Capua was fought in 211 BC, when the Romans besieged Capua. It is described by Polybius at 9.4–7, by Livy at 26.4–6, and by Appian at 37–44 of his Hannibalic War.

== Background ==
The defection of Capua to Hannibal after the Battle of Cannae in 216 BC was perhaps the most significant of his gains at the expense of the Roman alliance in Italy. As Livy put it, "a city of such renown, and such power, had draw a number of different peoples with her when she defected". Its recapture was thus a Roman priority, and a key conflict zone for Hannibal's war.

== Operations 215–211 BC ==
Hannibal had made Capua his winter quarter in 215 BC, and had conducted his campaigns against Nola and Casilinum from there. The Romans had attempted to march on Capua several times since its defection but were thwarted by the return of Hannibal's army rushing to its defence. In 212 BC, undeterred by the loss of some 16,000 men to Hannibal at the Battle of Herdonia, Rome made the capture of Capua their main priority and both consular armies were sent to besiege the city.

Hannibal marched to the relief of Capua and managed to drive off both consular armies. They retreated in opposite directions, knowing Hannibal could only pursue one. Unable to force the consular armies into a pitched battle, Hannibal marched for Brundusium, hoping to capture it by treachery.

=== Siege ===
The consular armies returned to Capua and renewed their blockade. Supplies were massed at Casilinum and strongholds were established along the Volturnus River. Great care was taken to secure safe and effective supply lines. The two consular armies were reinforced by a third army under a praetor Claudius Nero. They started to build a ditch and a wall to encircle and blockade the city and another ditch and wall facing outward to defend their siegeworks. In 211, the siege of Capua remained the main priority of the Senate and both consuls and Nero had their commands extended as pro-magistrates. While Hannibal was busy in the south of Italia, the Romans were employing innovative use of light-armed troops (velites) to ward off forays by the Capuan cavalry.

Hannibal attempted to relieve Capua by breaking through the Roman siege-lines. A Spanish cohort and three elephants penetrated the lines but were ultimately destroyed by the Romans before they could break into the Roman camp. Hannibal then tried to break the siege by marching on Rome itself, hoping that the threat would force the Roman army to break off the siege and march back to Rome to defend it. Once the Roman army was in the open, he would then turn to engage it in a pitched battle and defeat them once again, freeing Capua from the threat. However, Hannibal found the defences of Rome too formidable for an assault and as he had only planned this movement as a feint, he lacked both the supplies and equipment for a siege. The Roman besiegers of Capua, knowing this, ignored his march on Rome and refused to break off their siege, though Livy reports that a select relief force did march from Capua to Rome. His feint having failed, Hannibal was forced to retreat south and Capua unrelieved fell to the Romans shortly afterwards.

== Implications ==
In the aftermath Capua was severely punished by Rome: its magistrates and communal organization were abolished, and, while foreigners, freedmen and craftsmen remained intact, the citizen inhabitants who weren't killed lost their civic rights, and its territory was declared ager publicus (Roman state domain). Parts of it were sold in 205 BC and 199 BC, another part was divided among the citizens of the new colonies of Volturnum and Liternum, established near the coast in 194 BC, but the greater portion of it was reserved to be let by the state.

The fall of Capua marked a significant milestone in the Roman strategy of defeating Hannibal through the attrition of siege warfare; as well as signalling the failure of Hannibal to forge a viable relationship with the defecting Italian cities.

== See also ==
- Siege of Syracuse (213–212 BC)
