= Gnaeus Fulvius Centumalus Maximus =

Roman general and statesman

Gnaeus Fulvius Centumalus Maximus (died 210 BC) was a consul of the Roman Republic in 211 BC. As consul, Fulvius defended Rome against Hannibal with his colleague Publius Sulpicius Galba Maximus during the Second Punic War.

Fulvius was curule aedile in 214 BC, presenting a four-day program of theatrical events (ludi scaenici) with his colleague Publius Sempronius Tuditanus. As praetor the following year, he was stationed at Suessula and received the knights from Capua who had decided to defect from Hannibal and join Rome.

For his consular province (provincia) he was assigned to Apulia. He returned to Rome to hold elections for the following year, while Sulpicius went to assume command in Greece. Fulvius's imperium in Apulia was prorogued for the year 210. He was killed at the Battle of Herdonia in a surprise attack by Hannibal.

Political offices
| Preceded by Quintus Fulvius Flaccus; Appius Claudius Pulcher | Roman consul 211 BC with Publius Sulpicius Galba Maximus | Succeeded by Marcus Claudius Marcellus; Marcus Valerius Laevinus |
