= Battle of Herdonia (210 BC) =

210 BC battle in the Second Punic War

Second Battle of Herdonia
- Part of the Second Punic War
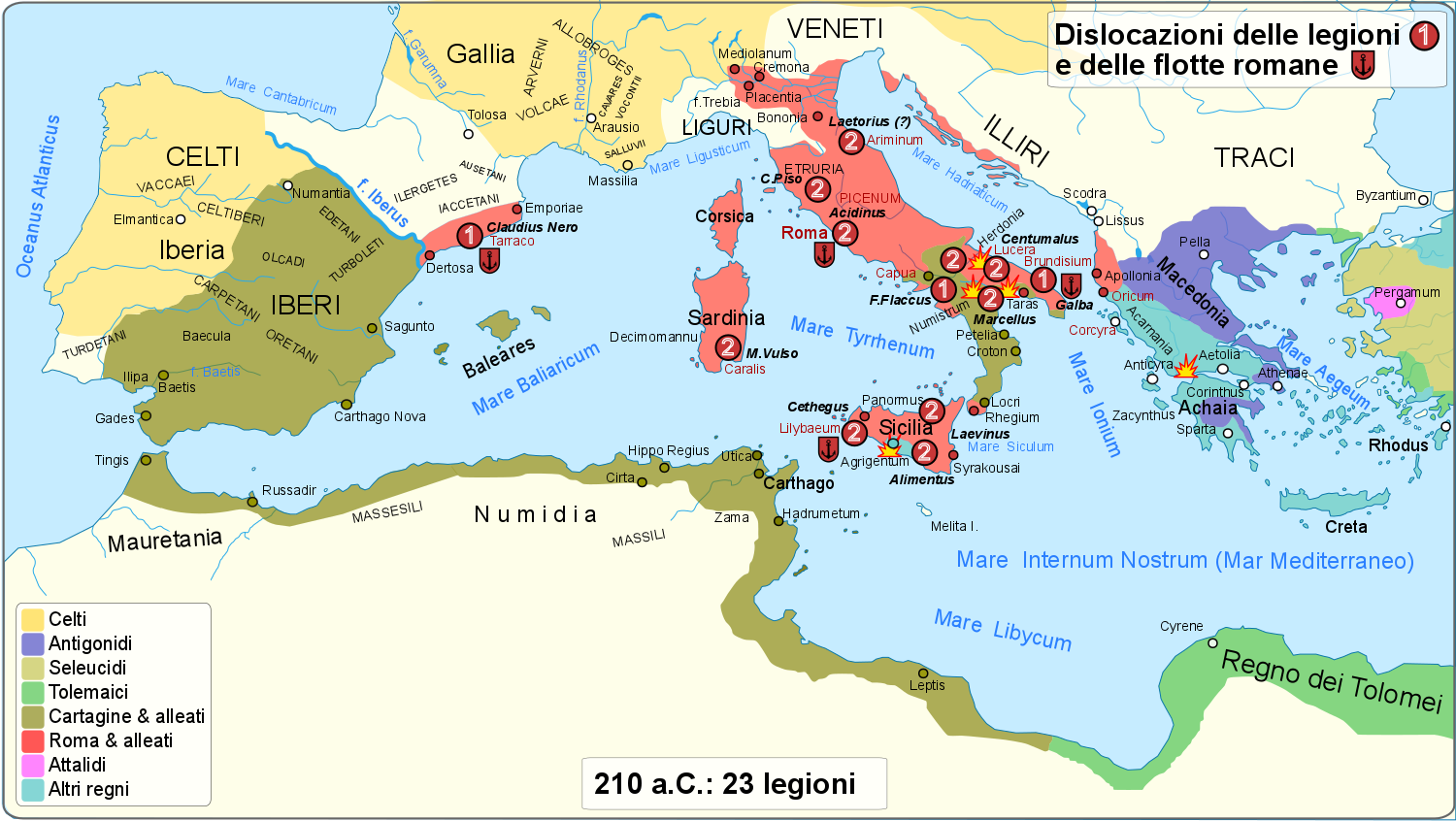
- Strategic situation in 210 BC
Date	210 BC
Location	Herdonia (modern Ordona, Foggia), present-day Italy 41.3167°N 15.6333°E
Result	Carthaginian victory

Belligerents
Carthage	Roman Republic

Commanders and leaders
Hannibal	Gnaeus Fulvius Centumalus †

Strength
More than the Romans	Two Roman legions and allies

Casualties and losses
Minimal	7,000–13,000 killed 4,344 survivors

The second battle of Herdonia took place in 210 BC during the Second Punic War. Hannibal, leader of the Carthaginians, who had invaded Italy eight years earlier, encircled and destroyed a Roman army which was operating against his allies in Apulia. The heavy defeat increased the war's burden on Rome and, piled on previous military disasters (such as Lake Trasimene, Cannae, and others), aggravated the relations with her exhausted Italian allies. For Hannibal the battle was a tactical success, but did not halt for long the Roman advance. Within the next three years the Romans reconquered most of the territories and cities lost at the beginning of the war and pushed the Carthaginian general to the southwestern end of the Apennine Peninsula.

== Controversy among historians ==
There is a controversy among modern historians arising from the narrative of Titus Livius, the major source of this event, who describes two battles taking place in the span of two years (in 212 BC and 210 BC) at the same place (Herdonia) between Hannibal and Roman commanders with similar names (Gn. Fulvius Flaccus and Gn. Fulvius Centumalus). Some state that there was just one battle in fact, but there is no general agreement on this issue.

== Developments in southern Italy until 210 BC ==
Following his incursion into southern Italy in 217 BC, Hannibal defeated the Roman forces in the Battle of Cannae (216 BC). This victory brought him a host of new allies from Campania, Samnium, Apulia, Lucania, Bruttium, and Magna Graecia, who revolted from Rome enticed by his narrative of Roman oppression. One of these allies was the city of Herdonia in northern Apulia. It was the site of a general engagement between Hannibal and the Romans already in 212 BC (see the first battle of Herdonia), because despite the severe defeats on the battlefield, Rome still managed to preserve intact the core of its system of alliances in Italy and continued to mount a slow but steady counter-offensive.

The first battle of Herdonia ended with the almost total annihilation of the troops led by the praetor Gnaeus Fulvius Flaccus. However Flaccus' army was just a fraction of the forces fielded by Rome. The siege of Capua, which had begun years before, ended in 211 BC with the fall of the largest city that had taken the side of Hannibal after Cannae. The Carthaginian's inability to defend Capua reversed the mood among many of his allies and Hannibal's position began to weaken.

== Marcellus' successes and Centumalus' demise ==
The Roman advance in southern Italy continued in 210 BC. Two armies stood against Hannibal in Apulia. One was under the consul Marcus Claudius Marcellus. The proconsul Gnaeus Fulvius Centumalus commanded the other. Their overall strength was four Roman legions, plus an approximately equal allied contingent. Since they operated not far from each other, Hannibal did not dare to challenge them. This allowed Marcellus to capture the city of Salapia (see the map), that was betrayed to him by a fraction of its citizens, and to destroy the Carthaginian garrison.

Following this setback, Hannibal retreated and a rumour was spread that he was going away to Bruttium. Upon learning this, Marcellus moved to Samnium and reduced two more towns that served as Carthaginian bases in this region. Meanwhile, Hannibal returned to northern Apulia with forced marches and managed to catch Centumalus off-guard when the latter was besieging Herdonia. Despite the Carthaginian numerical superiority the proconsul did not decline the battle. He arranged his army in two battle lines and clashed with the Carthaginian infantry. Hannibal waited until the Romans and their allies were fully engaged and sent his Numidian cavalry to surround them. Part of the Numidians attacked the Roman camp which was insufficiently protected. The others fell upon the rear legion and dispersed it. The same happened to the Romans fighting in the front line. Centumalus, eleven (out of twelve) military tribunes, and 7,000–13,000 soldiers were slain. The rest were scattered and some escaped to Marcellus in Samnium.

== Repercussions on Rome ==
The victory did not bring strategic advantages to Hannibal. Judging that in the long run he could not retain Herdonia, the Carthaginian general decided to resettle its population in Metapontum and Thurii to the south and destroy the city itself. Before that he set an example to other eventual traitors by executing some of the distinguished citizens who had conspired to betray Herdonia to Centumalus. For the rest of the summer he was forced to fight off the second Roman army. The next battle with Marcellus at Numistro was inconclusive and Hannibal was unable to regain the positions lost at the beginning of the campaign.

The second defeat at Herdonia did not make the Roman Senate change its warlike stance. Once again, as in the aftermath of Cannae, the senators resorted to punitive actions against the remnants of the defeated army. 4,344 men were rounded up and sent to Sicily where they joined the survivors of Cannae and were sentenced to serve on the island until the end of the war. This had undesired repercussions. The deportation of the soldiers, most of whom were of Latin origin, caused considerable discontent among the Latin colonies which had already been drained by ten years of continuous warfare on Italian soil. Amidst great want of additional manpower and financial resources twelve out of thirty colonies refused to send any more levies and money to Rome. This crisis continued for five years and put severe strain on the Roman war effort.

== See also ==
- First Battle of Herdonia (212 BC)

== Sources ==
Note: All links to online sources were active on October 26, 2007

- Appian, Roman History, The Hannibalic War, Livius Articles on Ancient History
- Eutropius, Abridgement of Roman History, Book III (transl. J. S. Watson, London 1853), available on Corpus Scriptorum Latinorum - A Digital Library of Latin Literature
- Livius, Titus, The History of Rome, Vol. IV (ed. E. Rhys, translated by C. Roberts), University of Virginia Library Electronic Text Center
- Caven, Brian, The Punic Wars, Weidenfeld and Nicolson, London 1980, ISBN 0-297-77633-9
- Delbrück, Hans, Geschichte der Kriegskunst im Rahmen der politischen Geschichte, I Teil: Das Altertum, Walter de Gruyter & Co., Berlin 1964
- Smith, William (ed.), Dictionary of Greek and Roman Biography and Mythology, University of Michigan
- Shepherd, William, Historical Atlas, New York: Henry Holt and Company, 1911 (part of Perry–Castañeda Library Map Collection at the University of Texas Libraries, The University of Texas at Austin website)
