= Mutiny at Sucro =

Sucro
- ancient Mediterranean fort
- Location in Spain
- Coordinates: 39°9′50″N 0°15′6″W
- Country: Spain
- Autonomous community: Valencian Community
- Province: Valencia
- Comarca: Ribera Baixa
- Judicial district: Sueca
- Elevation: 2 m (6.6 ft)
- Demonym(s): Cullerenc, cullerenca Cullerà, cullerana
- Time zone: UTC+1 (CET)
  - Summer (DST): UTC+2 (CEST)
- Official language(s): Spanish
- Website: Official website

The mutiny at Sucro occurred in 206 BC, during the Second Punic War. A garrison of soldiers established in Iberia by Scipio Africanus grew dissatisfied with their pay, the division of plunder, the long duration of their military service, and shortages of supplies. Receiving word that Scipio was ill, the soldiers mutinied. Scipio recovered from his illness and negotiated with the men via a group of military tribunes, then quelled the uprising by arresting and executing its ringleaders. Afterward, Scipio reestablished and maintained the loyalty of his troops by ensuring they were properly paid and supplied. Ancient writers including the Greek historian Polybius and the Roman historian Livy stressed the significance of the event, portraying Scipio favorably and praising his decisive actions while downplaying the question of whether the mutineers' complaints were justified.
