= Battle of Beneventum (214 BC) =

Roman victory in the Second Punic War

- Part of the Second Punic War
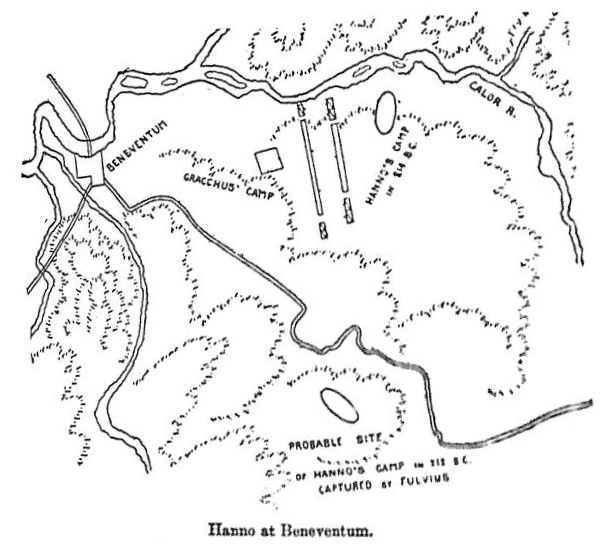
- Plan of the Battle of Beneventum (214 BC)
Date	214 BC
Location	Beneventum; modern Benevento 41.1333°N 14.7833°E
Result	Roman victory

Belligerents
Rome	Carthage

Commanders and leaders
Tiberius Sempronius Gracchus	Hanno

Strength
Unknown	18,200 17,000 infantry 1,200 Numidian cavalry

Casualties and losses
2,000 killed	16,200 killed or captured

The Battle of Beneventum was fought in 214 BC near modern Benevento during the Second Punic War. Roman legions under Tiberius Sempronius Gracchus defeated Hanno's Carthaginian forces, denying Hannibal reinforcements. Livy gives a brief description of the battle, which was part of the Roman campaign to subdue the southern Italian city-states that had joined Hannibal after the Battle of Cannae.

== Background ==
Hannibal, while preparing to assault the city of Nola in Campania, was waiting for his lieutenant Hanno to bring his 1,200 Numidian horsemen along with 17,000 Bruttians and Lucanians up the Via Appia from Bruttium. Hanno had been ordered down there on a previous occasion to stir up the southern cities of Magna Graecia against Rome and to recruit fresh soldiers, which he had done. Hannibal ordered his lieutenant to come to him to reinforce him, and he specifically advised him to march to Campania by way of Beneventum. There were however, alternative routes that Hanno could have taken.

The consul Fabius had ordered Gracchus, a praetor, to march from Lucercia, where he had been wintering, on to Beneventum. Fabius' son, the Q. Fabius Maximus who became consul the following year, was in command of a separate force, and was ordered to take possession of Lucercia. Fabius ordered Gracchus to Beneventum with the idea of cooping up Hannibal in Campania, he had failed to do this previously in 215 BC, and perhaps with the scheme in mind of preventing reinforcements from reaching him. There is no evidence that Fabius had any idea that reinforcements were on their way.

== Preliminaries ==
Hanno and Gracchus reached the city about the same time, but Gracchus got actual possession of the city due to the fact that there was a Roman garrison within it. He encamped about a mile outside of the city, astride Hanno's path. Hanno encamped roughly three miles from the city. It was at this time that Gracchus received permission from the senate to promise the two legions that consisted of slaves, that were the battle won, and they brought him the head of an enemy, they would be granted their freedom.

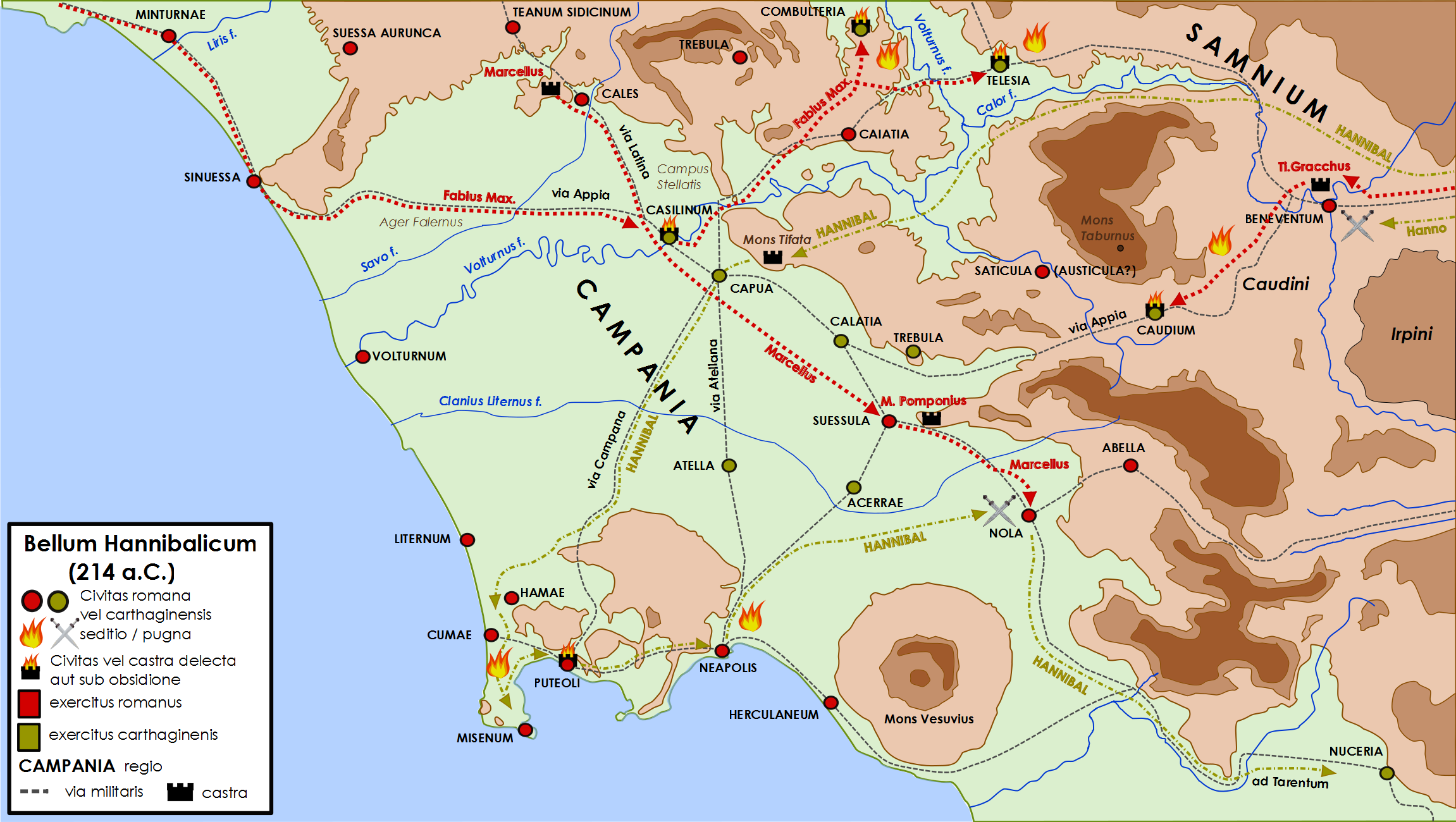
Map of Campanian operations in 214 BC

It was not until the next day that the armies lined up in order of battle. The two sides arrayed their respective forces in a fashion typical of the day. Hanno, with his right wing, half his cavalry, placed on the Calor river. Next to these, in his center, came his infantry. To the left of these, "Flying in the air" so to speak due to the fact they were not protected by any topographical feature, was the other half of Hanno's cavalry.

The Roman line was longer than that of the Carthaginians. The Roman left was similarly arrayed, except that the Roman cavalry was stationed on the left. Traditionally, the Roman cavalry was weaker in number than the allied cavalry. To the right of the Roman cavalry were the legions. Traditionally, a Roman army consisted of four legions, the two Roman legions "Proper" (In the sense that they were Roman) so to speak were on the inner part of the Roman line and the two allied legions were placed to the left and right of these respectively. However, it is not clear if there were any allied legions in this battle, it is not specified. It is also not specified where the proper Roman legions and the legions manned by slaves were placed respectively. To the right of the infantry was where the majority of the Roman cavalry was stationed.

== Battle ==
The ensuing battle was a bloody slogging match. Gracchus' proclamation almost proved to be the Roman¹s undoing. As not only were the slaves stopping to decapitate the slain, but they were carrying them around the battle field with them, thus hampering them. Realizing what was happening, he declared no man would be freed unless the enemy were completely defeated.

While this was going on, Gracchus ordered his cavalry to attack Hanno's flanks, where the Numidian cavalry was stationed. The Numidian cavalry fought skillfully against this cavalry charge, and for some time the combat on the flanks was in doubt. However, Gracchus again sent word through his orderlies to the rank and file that unless the enemy were quickly defeated, they would not win their freedom. Being thus motivated, the slave legions made one last desperate push, and forced the Carthaginian army to retreat back to their camp where they were swiftly followed by the legionaries themselves. Upon arriving in the camp, the Carthaginians found that some of their Roman prisoners had armed themselves with weapons. Completely surrounded, the Carthaginian reinforcements were utterly destroyed.

== Aftermath ==
The ensuing onslaught led to the total destruction of Hanno's army and the capture of his camp; less than 2,000 of his men escaped with their lives, including Hanno. 2,000 Romans were also killed in the battle. Although Gracchus proclaimed the liberty of his soldiers for thus winning the victory, there were some 4,000 soldiers that he was displeased with. As a result of this, he ordered that they should eat their evening meal standing, instead of sitting, for the rest of their service in the legions. In the legions, the morning meal was taken standing, but the evening meal was taken sitting. This gesture was meant to dishonor them for a perceived lack of courage during the battle.

Gracchus, after the battle, proceeded into Lucania, in order to prevent Hanno from raising another army in this area and using it to reinforce Hannibal. Gracchus was eventually able to push Hanno into Bruttium as a result of his victory outside of Beneventum.

Being robbed of the prospect of badly needed reinforcements, Hannibal was forced to come to terms with the fact that he would be unable to conduct a successful campaign in Campania.
