= Battle of Herdonia (212 BC) =

Battle of the Second Punic War

- Part of the Second Punic War
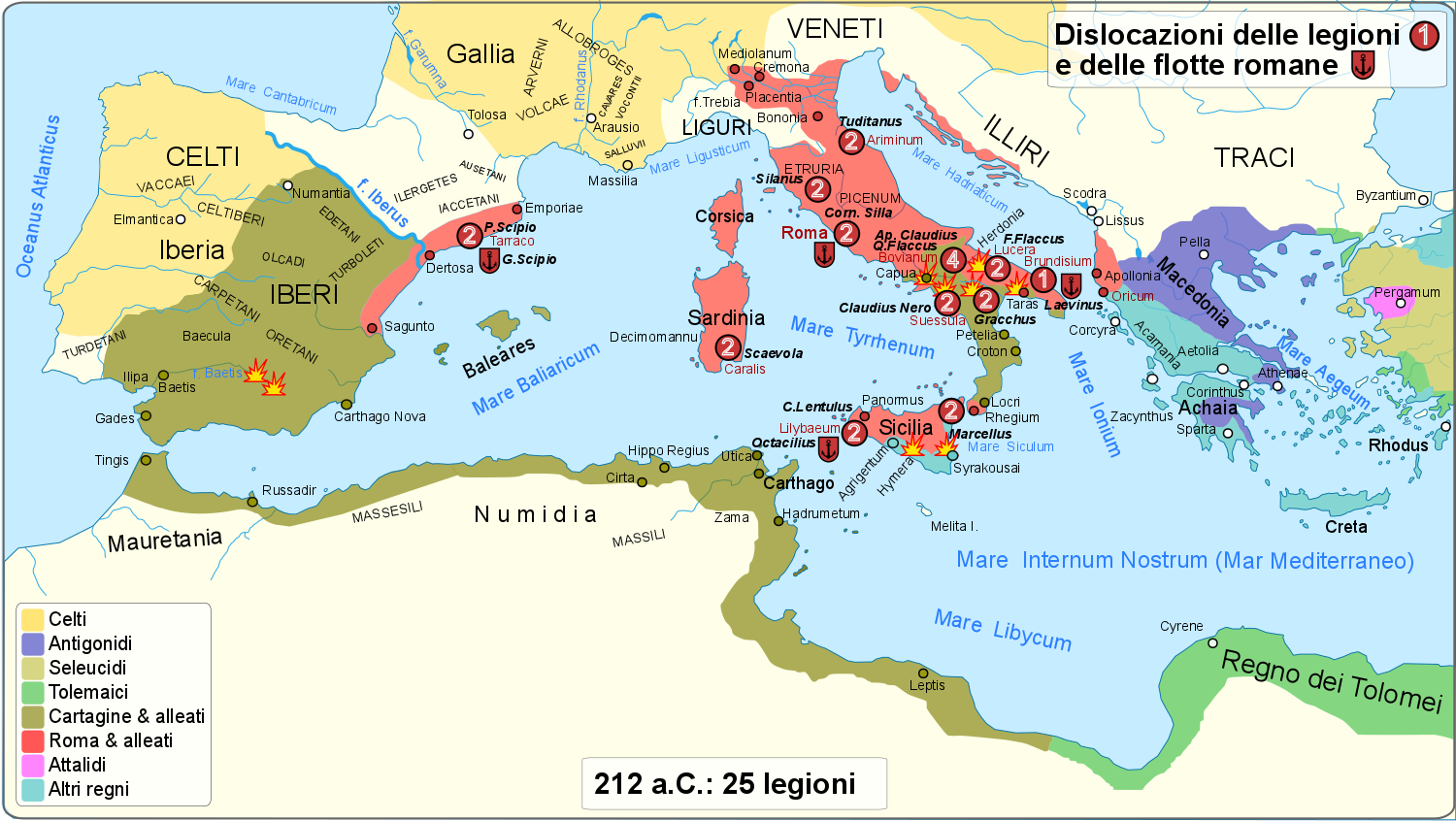
- Battles in 212 BC and the locations of the legions
Date	212 BC
Location	Herdonia (modern Ordona, Foggia), Apulia, present-day Italy 41.3167°N 15.6333°E
Result	Carthaginian victory

Belligerents
Carthage	Rome

Commanders and leaders
Hannibal	Gnaeus Fulvius Flaccus

Strength
Unknown total 3,000 light infantry 2,000 Numidian cavalry	18,000

Casualties and losses
Minimal	16,000 killed

The first Battle of Herdonia was fought in 212 BC during the Second Punic War between Hannibal's Carthaginian army and Roman forces led by Praetor Gnaeus Fulvius Flaccus, brother of the consul Quintus Fulvius Flaccus. The Roman army was destroyed, leaving Apulia free of Romans for the year.

== Prelude ==
In 212 BC, Hannibal destroyed the Roman army in Campania under the command of Marcus Centenius in the Battle of the Silarus. He then received news from Apulian envoys of a Roman army under Flaccus that was easy prey owing to its low discipline and lack of awareness. Sensing an opportunity for another quick victory, Hannibal marched east into Apulia.

== Battle ==
Fulvius and his army had had a rather easy time in Apulia, and the Romans were unaware of Hannibal's presence until he was within the immediate area of Herdonia. Fulvius is said to have become careless from his easy successes and his army was also weighted down with loot. Fulvius accepted battle on Hannibal's offer at the behest of his extremely eager soldiers. The Romans had about 18,000 men available.

Hannibal deployed his forces on the plain outside his camp, while sending about 3,000 light infantry to his extreme left flank to effect a surprise attack from the woodlands and farms located in that direction. Hannibal also sent out 2,000 Numidian cavalry to take control of the roads in the rear of Fulvius' army, thus cutting off all escape routes. Flaccus did not detect the deployments of the Carthaginians. Hannibal's army overwhelmed the Roman legions almost at once. Fulvius immediately fled the field with 200 cavalry as Hannibal's attacks came from the front, behind, and to both sides. Roughly 2,000 Romans are said to have survived the battle.

== Aftermath ==
In the span of a few weeks, Hannibal had killed 31,000 Roman and allied soldiers in two battles in Campania and Apulia. After the Herdonia battle, Hannibal marched south towards Tarentum, where the Romans were besieged in the citadel while the town had fallen to Carthaginian allies earlier in 212 BC. The Roman senate decided to raise four new legions to send to Apulia. The Roman consuls then marched nearer to Capua, intent on blockading the city totally.

The reason for Hannibal's retreat south has been a source of puzzlement for some authors. They have speculated that Hannibal had retired to rest his army and give the wounded a chance to recover after three hard-fought battles and rapid marches.

== See also ==
- Second Battle of Herdonia (210 BC)

== Bibliography ==
- Livius, Titus (2006). Hannibal's War: Books Twenty-One to Thirty. Translated by J. C. Yardley, introduction and notes by Dexter Hoyos. Oxford: Oxford University Press. ISBN 0-19-283159-3.
