= Battle of the Silarus =

212 BC victory of Hannibal's army

- Part of the Second Punic War
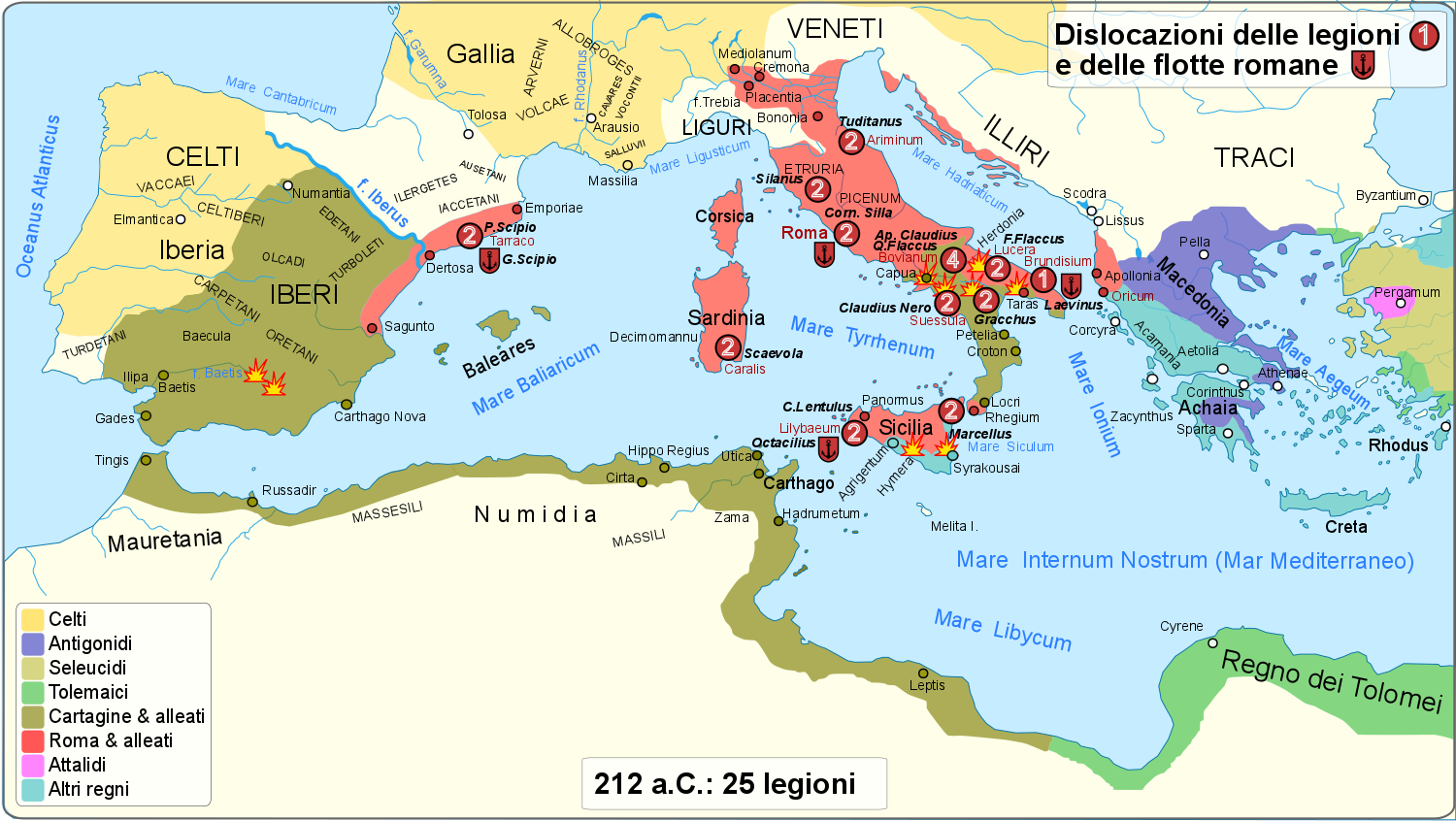
- Battles in 212 BC and the locations of the legions
Date	212 BC
Location	near Silarus River (modern Sele River), Italy 40°28′54″N 14°56′33″E
Result	Carthaginian victory

Belligerents
Carthage	Rome

Commanders and leaders
Hannibal	Marcus Centenius Penula †

Strength
Unknown	16,000

Casualties and losses
Light	15,000 killed
- Location within Italy Battle of the Silarus (Mediterranean)

The Battle of the Silarus was fought in 212 BC between Hannibal's army and a Roman force led by centurion Marcus Centenius Penula. The vastly outnumbered Carthaginians were victorious, destroying the entire Roman army and killing 15,000 Roman soldiers in the process.

== Prelude ==
Hannibal had lifted the siege of Capua after mauling two Roman consular armies in the Battle of Capua. The Roman consuls had split their forces, with Fulvius Flaccus moving towards Cumae, while Appius Claudius Pulcher marched towards Lucania. It is not sure why they had done so, because their forces still outnumbered Hannibal's army, even with the losses suffered in the battle. Hannibal decided to follow Claudius.

Claudius managed to evade the pursuit of Hannibal, but a centurion, Marcus Centenius Penula, had appealed to the Roman Senate for independent command against Hannibal, claiming that with his knowledge of Campania he could best the Carthaginians. His appeal was granted and 4,000 citizen soldiers and 4,000 allies were detached to serve under him, possibly from the army of Gracchus which was stationed in Lucania. To this force another 8,000 volunteers from Campania, Lucania, and Samnium were added.

While Appius Claudius and his consular army marched west to join his fellow consul, Centenius set off to attack Hannibal in Lucania. Hannibal learned of the Romans' approach and halted his pursuit of Claudius. Prior to the battle, Hannibal had his cavalry secure all roads in the area to stop any Roman retreat.

== Battle ==
The opposing columns spotted their enemies and immediately drew up into battle lines. The poorly equipped Romans held off Hannibal's veterans for two hours until Centenius was killed in action. The Roman army collapsed into a rout and 15,000 Roman soldiers were killed in the battle and pursuit, with only 1,000 escaping the Carthaginian cavalry blockade.

== Aftermath ==
After the battle, Hannibal did not pursue the army of Claudius. Instead, he marched east into Apulia, where a Roman army under Praetor Gnaeus Flavius Flaccus was operating against towns allied to Carthage. The Roman consular armies, free of Hannibal, united and resumed their harassment of Capua. Hanno the Elder remained in Bruttium.

=== Casualties ===
Out of 16,000 Romans, only 1,000 survived. These survivors were sent to join the disgraced legions of Cannae survivors after they had been rounded up.

== Bibliography ==
- Livius, Titus (2006). Hannibal's War: Books Twenty-One to Thirty. Translated by J.C. Yardley, introduction and notes by Dexter Hoyos. Oxford: Oxford University Press. ISBN 0-19-283159-3.
