= Battle of Canusium =

Battle in 209 BCE

- Part of the Second Punic War
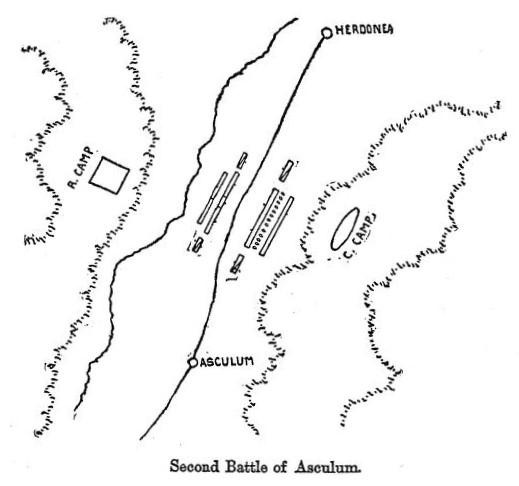
- Plan of the second battle of Asculum Calusium (Canusium)
| Date | Spring 209 BC |
| Location | Canusium, Apulia, present-day Italy 41.2366°N 16.0660°E |
| Result | Roman pyrrhic victory |

Belligerents
| Carthage | Roman Republic |

Commanders and leaders
| Hannibal | Marcus Claudius Marcellus |

Strength
| Unknown | 20,000 |

Casualties and losses
| Roman claim: 8,000 killed | 5,700 killed All the rest wounded |

The Battle of Canusium also known as the Battle of Asculum was a three-day engagement between the forces of Rome and Carthage. It took place in Apulia during the spring of 209 BC, the tenth year of the Second Punic War. A larger Roman offensive, of which it was a part, aimed to subjugate and to punish cities and tribes that had abandoned the alliance with Rome after the Battle of Cannae, and to narrow the base of the Carthaginian leader, Hannibal, in southern Italy.

The battle of Canusium was also an episode of the years-long contest between Hannibal and the Roman general Marcus Claudius Marcellus for control over that territory. As neither side gained a decisive victory and both suffered considerable losses (up to 14,000 killed overall), the outcome of this engagement was open to differing interpretations by both ancient and modern historians. While Marcellus took a heavy blow at Canusium, he nevertheless checked for some time the movements of the main Punic forces and thus contributed to the simultaneous Roman successes against Hannibal's allies in Magna Graecia and Lucania.

== Prelude ==
Fabius, consul in 209 BC, made retaking Tarentum his priority. His colleague, Q. Fulvius Flaccus, and Marcus Claudius Marcellus, now a proconsul, had the task of keeping Hannibal's Carthaginian army from assisting the city. Each of the three generals had an army of two legions with their allied auxiliaries. While Fabius advanced to Tarentum, Fulvius marched into Lucania. The third army under Marcellus fought in Apulia. A fourth force was ordered by Fabius to attack Hannibal's Bruttian allies.

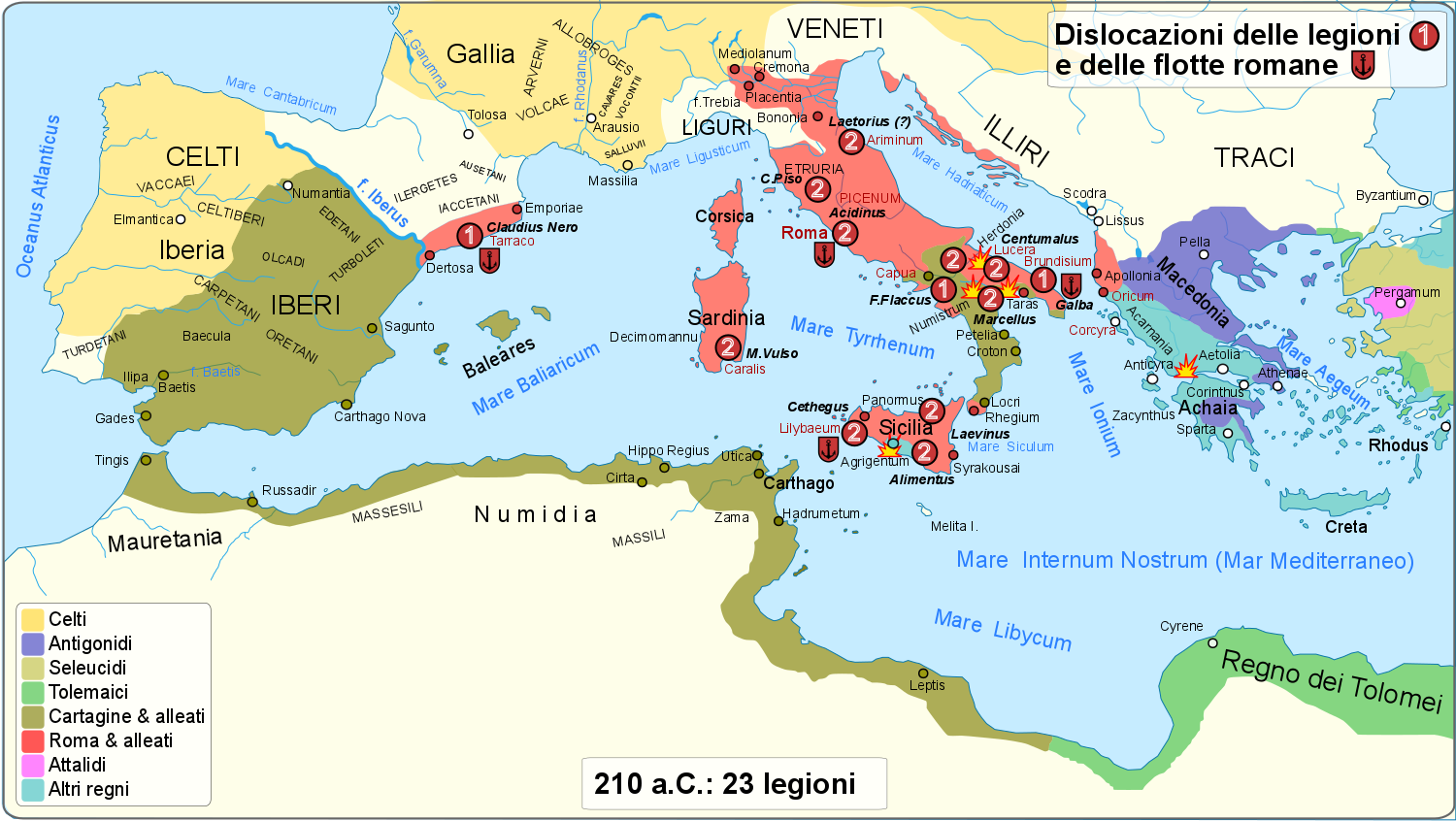
Strategic situation in 210 BC

== Battle ==
It was Marcellus' lot to confront Hannibal directly, for the Carthaginian general chose Apulia for his main operations after winter's end. Hannibal made the first move by encamping near Canusium, hoping to persuade its inhabitants to break their allegiance to Rome. Canusium was not far from Salapia, a town whose Numidian garrison had been betrayed to and slaughtered by Marcellus the preceding year. Hannibal's intention was to restore his influence in the area. However, as soon as the proconsul approached, the Carthaginian withdrew from Canusium. The loss of the Numidian contingent in Salapia had deprived him of one of his advantages over the Romans – his strong cavalry, so the open and flat terrain was no longer as favorable as it had been at the time of Cannae. That is why Hannibal retreated, endeavoring to lure Marcellus into an ambush. The Romans, relentlessly pursuing, forced a battle. Initial skirmishes grew to a general battle which ended only when night fell and both sides disengaged and fortified their camps.

On the next day Hannibal decided to stand his ground and in the renewed fighting the Romans were heavily beaten. One of the wings of the first battle line, composed of allied levies, was forced to give ground. Marcellus ordered the legion positioned in the rear to relieve the retreating allies. This proved to be an error, as the ensuing manoeuvre and the continuing Carthaginian advance threw the entire Roman army into disorder. The Romans were put to flight and 2,700 of them were killed before the rest could take refuge behind the palisade of the camp.

Marcellus was undaunted by this setback, and although many of his men were wounded, he led them to yet another long and inconclusive fight on the third day. Hannibal's elite Iberian troops were unable to break the Romans, and the Carthaginian brought up his war elephants. At first they produced the desired effect by trampling and scattering the Roman front, but a successful counterstrike by a maniple of hastati turned the beasts against their own troops and caused disorder among the Carthaginian ranks. Marcellus seizing the opportunity, threw his cavalry, kept so far in reserve, into the action. The cavalry charge was followed by an all-out and irresistible infantry attack. Hannibal's forces fell back to their camp with heavy losses (8,000 killed according to Livy). The toll on Marcellus' troops was even heavier than that of the preceding day – 3,000 killed and nearly all the rest wounded, according to Plutarch – so he declined to pursue Hannibal when the latter broke camp and marched south the following night.

== Aftermath ==
As a result of the battle of Canusium, the army of Marcellus was effectively put out of action. Sparing his soldiers, most of whom were wounded, the proconsul retired to Sinuesa (Campania) according to Plutarch, or Venusia (Apulia) according to Livy, where he was inactive the rest of the summer, allowing Hannibal to traverse southern Italy unchecked. This prompted Marcellus' political enemies in Rome to accuse him of bad generalship for two defeats that year, undermining Livy's claim of Marcellus' victory on the third day at Canusium, and to ask the Senate and People to relieve him of his command. Nevertheless, Marcellus was elected consul once again and was authorized to seek a decisive engagement with Hannibal in the following year.

Still in the summer of 209 BC, while Marcellus was fighting Hannibal in Apulia, the army under the consul Quintus Fulvius Flaccus effected the submission of northern Lucania. The other consul, Quintus Fabius Maximus, assaulted the city of Manduria, in the Sallentine. It was hardly 35 km away from Tarentum. Having disentangled himself from Marcellus, although the army of Fabius was very close to Tarentum, Hannibal hurried to rescue the city of Caulonia (in the farthest corner of southwestern Italy for Bruttium was also under Roman attack). Unopposed by the main Roman forces the Carthaginian commander managed to intercept and destroy near Caulonia an 8,000 strong detachment that had attacked the Bruttians from Regium, and thus retained control over the region. But this fight delayed him and he would not arrive in time to save Tarentum from Fabius' assault. He was five miles away when Fabius sacked Tarentum.
