= Second Punic War =

War between Rome and Carthage (218–201 BC)

- Part of the Punic Wars
- The western Mediterranean in 218 BC
Date	Spring 218 – 201 BC (17 years)
Location	Western Mediterranean
Result	Roman victory
Territorial changes	Roman conquest of Carthaginian Iberia; Carthaginian African territories reduced

Belligerents
Rome; Massalia; Syracuse (218–215 BC); Eastern Numidia; Others	Carthage: Syracuse (214–212 BC); Western Numidia; Others

Commanders and leaders
Scipio Africanus; Fabius Maximus; Publius Scipio †; Many others	Hannibal; Hasdrubal Barca †; Mago Barca (DOW); Many others

The Second Punic War (218 to 201 BC) was the second in a series of three wars fought between Carthage and the Roman Republic, who were at the time the two main powers in the western Mediterranean. The protracted war was fought across the region, incurring immense materiel and human losses on both sides. Carthaginian general Hannibal Barca initially led his army on its famous crossing of the Alps and invaded Italy, where he led an extended campaign. In Iberia, Roman troops invaded and eventually conquered the Carthaginian territories there. The final confrontation of the war occurred with the Roman invasion of North Africa. Roman general Scipio Africanus and Hannibal faced off at the Battle of Zama, which the Romans won, resulting in Carthage’s surrender. The war also drew in other powers. Macedon allied with Carthage, triggering the First Macedonian War, which caused Rome to seek its own allies in the Eastern Mediterranean. The Sicilian city state of Syracuse initially allied with Carthage, but switched sides to support Rome. The Carthaginians and Romans also both made use of Numidian, Gallic, and Iberian allies.

The First Punic War had ended in a Roman victory in 241 BC after 23 years and enormous losses on both sides. After the war Carthage expanded its holdings in Iberia where in 219 BC a Carthaginian army under Hannibal besieged, captured and sacked the pro-Roman city of Saguntum. In spring 218 BC Rome declared war on Carthage, beginning the Second Punic War. Later that year, Hannibal surprised the Romans by marching his army overland from Iberia, through Gaul and over the Alps to Cisalpine Gaul (modern northern Italy). Reinforced by Gallic allies he obtained crushing victories over the Romans at the battles of Trebia (218) and Lake Trasimene (217). Moving to southern Italy in 216 Hannibal defeated the Romans again at the battle of Cannae, where he annihilated the largest army the Romans had ever assembled. After the death or capture of more than 120,000 Roman troops in less than three years, many of Rome's Italian allies, notably Capua, defected to Carthage, giving Hannibal control over much of southern Italy. As Syracuse and Macedonia joined the Carthaginian side after Cannae, the conflict spread. Between 215 and 210 BC the Carthaginians attempted to capture Roman-held Sicily and Sardinia, but were unsuccessful. The Romans took drastic steps to raise new legions: enrolling slaves, criminals and those who did not meet the usual property qualification; this vastly increased the number of men they had under arms. For the next decade the war in southern Italy continued, with Roman armies slowly recapturing most of the Italian cities that had joined Carthage.

The Romans established a lodgement in north-east Iberia in 218 BC; the Carthaginians repeatedly attempted and failed to reduce it. In 211 the Romans took the offensive in Iberia and were badly defeated but maintained their hold on the north-east. In 209 BC the new Roman commander Publius Scipio captured Carthago Nova, the main Carthaginian base in the peninsula. In 208 Scipio defeated Hasdrubal, although Hasdrubal was able to withdraw most of his troops into Gaul and then Cisalpine Gaul in early 207 BC. This new Carthaginian invasion was defeated at the Battle of the Metaurus. At the battle of Ilipa in 206 Scipio permanently ended the Carthaginian presence in Iberia.

Scipio invaded Carthaginian Africa in 204 BC, compelling the Carthaginian Senate to recall Hannibal's army from Italy. The final engagement of the war took place between armies under Scipio and Hannibal at the Battle of Zama in 202 and resulted in Hannibal's defeat and in Carthage suing for peace. The peace treaty dictated by Rome stripped Carthage of all of its overseas territories and some of its African ones. An indemnity of 10,000 silver talents was to be paid over 50 years. Carthage was prohibited from waging war outside Africa, and in Africa only with Rome's express permission. Henceforth it was clear Carthage was politically subordinate to Rome. Rome used Carthaginian military activity against the Numidians as a pretext to declare war again in 149 BC starting the Third Punic War. In 146 BC the Romans stormed the city of Carthage, sacked it, slaughtered most of its population and completely demolished it.

== Primary sources ==
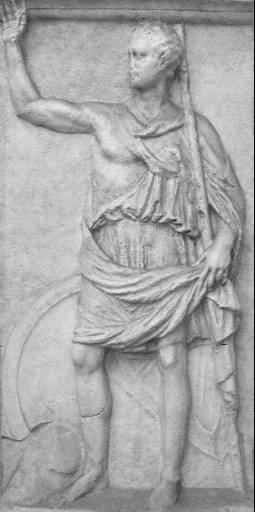
Polybius

The most reliable source for the Second Punic War (Note: The term Punic comes from the Latin word Punicus (or Poenicus), meaning "Carthaginian" and is a reference to the Carthaginians' Phoenician ancestry.) is the historian Polybius (c. 200 – c. 118 BC), a Greek sent to Rome in 167 BC as a hostage. He is best known for The Histories, written sometime after 146 BC. Polybius's work is considered broadly objective and largely neutral between Carthaginian and Roman points of view. Polybius was an analytical historian and wherever possible interviewed participants, from both sides, in the events he wrote about. Modern historians consider Polybius to have treated the relatives of Scipio Aemilianus, his patron and friend, unduly favourably but the consensus is to accept his account largely at face value. The modern historian Andrew Curry sees Polybius as being "fairly reliable"; Craige Champion describes him as "a remarkably well-informed, industrious, and insightful historian".

Much of Polybius's account of the Second Punic War is missing after 216 BC or only exists in fragmentary form. As a result, the main source for much of the war is the account written by the Roman historian Livy. This is commonly used by modern historians where Polybius's account is not extant. Livy relied heavily on Polybius, but wrote in a more structured way, with more details about Roman politics; he was also openly pro-Roman. His accounts of military encounters are often demonstrably inaccurate; the classicist Adrian Goldsworthy says Livy's "reliability is often suspect", and the historian Phillip Sabin refers to Livy's "military ignorance".

Other, later, ancient histories of the war exist, although often in fragmentary or summary form. (Note: Sources other than Polybius are discussed by Bernard Mineo in "Principal Literary Sources for the Punic Wars (apart from Polybius)".) Modern historians usually take into account the writings of Diodorus Siculus and Cassius Dio, two Greek authors writing during the Roman era; they are described by John Lazenby as "clearly far inferior" to Livy, but some fragments of Polybius can be recovered from their texts. The Greek moralist Plutarch wrote several biographies of Roman commanders in his Parallel Lives. Other sources include coins, inscriptions, archaeological evidence and empirical evidence from reconstructions.

== Opposing forces ==
Most male Roman citizens were liable for military service and would serve as infantry, the wealthier equites providing a cavalry component. Traditionally, when at war the Romans would raise four legions, each of 4,200 infantry (Note: This could be increased to 5,000 in some circumstances, or, rarely, even more.) and 300 cavalry. Approximately 1,200 of the infantry, poorer or younger men unable to afford the armour and equipment of a standard legionary, served as javelin-armed skirmishers, known as velites. They carried several javelins, which would be thrown from a distance, a short sword and a 90-centimetre (3 ft) shield. The rest were equipped as heavy infantry, with body armour, a large shield and short thrusting swords. They were divided into three ranks: the front rank also carried two javelins, while the second and third ranks were equipped with a thrusting spear instead. Legionary sub-units and individual legionaries both fought in relatively open order. It was the long-standing Roman procedure to elect two men each year as senior magistrates, known as consuls, who in time of war would each lead an army. An army was usually formed by combining two Roman legions with a similarly sized and equipped pair of legions provided by their Latin allies. These legions usually had a larger attached complement of cavalry than Roman ones.

Carthaginian citizens only served in their army if there was a direct threat to the city. When they did, they fought as well-armoured heavy infantry armed with long thrusting spears, although they were notoriously ill-trained and ill-disciplined. In most circumstances Carthage recruited foreigners to make up its army. (Note: Roman and Greek sources refer to these foreign fighters derogatively as "mercenaries", but the modern historian Adrian Goldsworthy describes this as "a gross oversimplification". They served under a variety of arrangements; for example, some were the regular troops of allied cities or kingdoms seconded to Carthage as part of formal treaties, some were from allied states fighting under their own leader, many were volunteers from areas under Carthaginian control who were not Carthaginian citizens. (Which was largely reserved for inhabitants of the city of Carthage.)) Many were from North Africa and these were frequently referred to as "Libyans". The region provided several types of fighters, including: close-order infantry equipped with large shields, helmets, short swords and long thrusting spears; javelin-armed light infantry skirmishers; close-order shock cavalry (Note: "Shock" troops are those trained to close rapidly and aggressively with their opponents, with the intention of breaking their formation before, or immediately upon, contact.) also known as "heavy cavalry" carrying spears; and light cavalry skirmishers who threw javelins from a distance and avoided close combat. The latter cavalry were usually Numidians.

The close-order Libyan infantry and the citizen-militia would fight in a tightly packed formation known as a phalanx. On occasion some of the infantry would wear captured Roman armour, especially among Hannibal's troops. Both Iberia and Gaul provided large numbers of experienced infantry and cavalry. These infantry were unarmoured troops who would charge ferociously, but had a reputation for breaking off if a combat was protracted. The Gallic cavalry, and possibly some of the Iberians, wore armour and fought as close-order troops; most or all of the mounted Iberians were light cavalry. Slingers were frequently recruited from the Balearic Islands. The Carthaginians also employed war elephants; North Africa had indigenous African forest elephants at the time. (Note: These elephants were typically about 2.5 m (8 ft 2 in) high at the shoulder and should not be confused with the larger African bush elephants.)

Garrison duty and land blockades were the most common operations. When armies were campaigning, surprise attacks, ambushes and stratagems were common. More formal battles were usually preceded by the two armies camping 2–12 kilometres (1–7 mi) apart for days or weeks; sometimes forming up in battle order each day. If either commander felt at a disadvantage, they might march off without engaging. In such circumstances it was difficult to force a battle if the other commander was unwilling to fight. Forming up in battle order was a complicated and premeditated affair, which took several hours. Infantry were usually positioned in the centre of the battle line, with light infantry skirmishers to their front and cavalry on each flank. Many battles were decided when one side's infantry force was attacked in the flank or rear and they were partially or wholly enveloped.

Both states possessed large fleets throughout the war. The Carthaginian fleet rarely put to sea, and when it did it was usually to escort transport ships; it rarely acted aggressively. This gave the Romans naval superiority for the duration of the war.

== Background ==
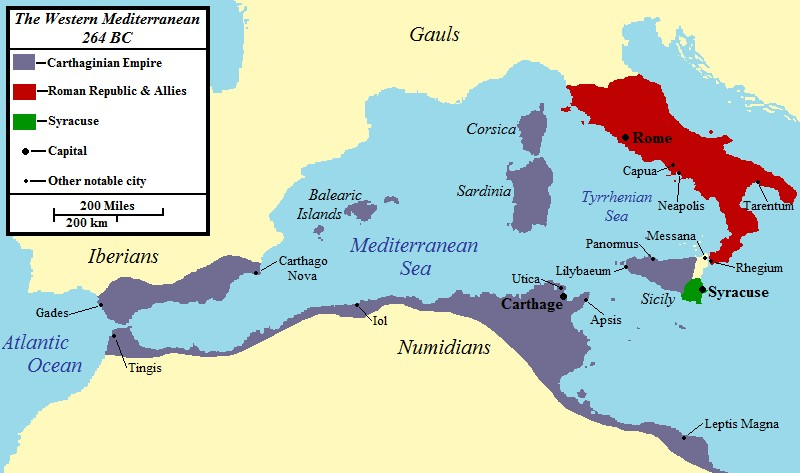
The approximate extent of territory controlled by Rome and Carthage immediately before the start of the First Punic War

The Roman Republic had been aggressively expanding in the southern Italian mainland for a century and had conquered peninsular Italy south of the Arno River by 270 BC, after the Pyrrhic War when the Greek cities of southern Italy (Magna Graecia) submitted. During this period of Roman expansion, Carthage, with its capital in what is now Tunisia, had come to dominate southern Iberia, much of the coastal regions of North Africa, the Balearic Islands, Corsica, Sardinia and the western half of Sicily.

Carthaginian territory gained by Rome and major battles of the First Punic War

By 264 BC Carthage was the dominant external power on Sicily, and Carthage and Rome were the preeminent powers in the western Mediterranean. Relationships were good, the two states had several times declared their mutual friendship and there were strong commercial links. According to the classicist Richard Miles Rome's expansionary attitude after southern Italy came under its control combined with Carthage's proprietary approach to Sicily caused the two powers to stumble into war more by accident than design. The immediate cause of the First Punic War was the issue of control of the independent Sicilian city state of Messana (modern Messina). In 264 BC Carthage and Rome went to war.

The war was fought primarily on Sicily and its surrounding waters; the Romans also unsuccessfully invaded North Africa in 256 BC. It was the longest continuous conflict and the greatest naval war of antiquity, with immense materiel and human losses on both sides. In 241 BC, after 23 years of war, the Carthaginians were defeated. Under the Roman-dictated Treaty of Lutatius Carthage ceded its Sicilian possessions to Rome. Rome exploited Carthage's distraction during the Truceless War against rebellious mercenaries and Libyan subjects to break the peace treaty and annex Carthaginian Sardinia and Corsica in 238 BC. Under the leadership of Hamilcar Barca, Carthage defeated the rebels in 237 BC.

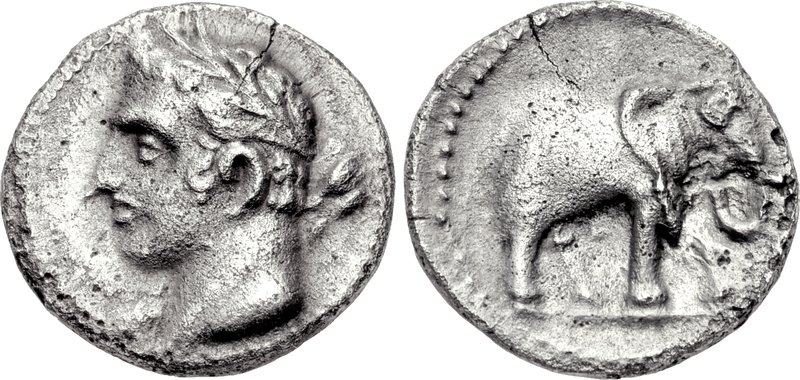
A Carthaginian quarter-shekel, dated 237–209 BC, depicting the Punic god Melqart, who was associated with Hercules/Heracles. On the reverse is an elephant, possibly a war elephant; these were linked with the Barcids.

With the suppression of the rebellion, Hamilcar understood that Carthage needed to strengthen its economic and military base if it was to confront Rome again; Carthaginian possessions in Iberia (modern Spain and Portugal) were limited to a handful of prosperous coastal cities in the south and Hamilcar took the army which he had led in the Truceless War to Iberia in 237 BC and carved out a quasi-monarchical, autonomous state in southern and eastern Iberia. This gave Carthage the silver mines, agricultural wealth, manpower, military facilities such as shipyards, and territorial depth to stand up to future Roman demands with confidence. Hamilcar ruled as a viceroy and was succeeded by his son-in-law, Hasdrubal, in 229 BC and then his son, Hannibal, in 221 BC.

Roman diplomatic missions, 219–218 BC

In 226 BC the Ebro Treaty was agreed with Rome, specifying the Ebro River as the northern boundary of the Carthaginian sphere of influence. At some time during the next six years Rome made a separate agreement with the city of Saguntum, which was situated well south of the Ebro. In 219 BC a Carthaginian army under Hannibal besieged Saguntum, and after eight months captured and sacked it. Rome complained to the Carthaginian government, sending an embassy headed by Quintus Fabius Maximus to its senate with peremptory demands. When these were rejected Rome declared war in the spring of 218 BC.

Since the end of the First Punic War Rome had also been expanding, especially in the area of north Italy either side of the River Po known as Cisalpine Gaul. Roman attempts to establish towns and farms in the region from 232 BC led to repeated wars with the local Gallic tribes, who were finally defeated in 222. In 218 the Romans pushed even further north, establishing two new towns, or "colonies", on the Po and appropriating large areas of the best land. Most of the Gauls resented this intrusion.

== Italy ==
=== Hannibal crosses the Alps, 218 BC ===
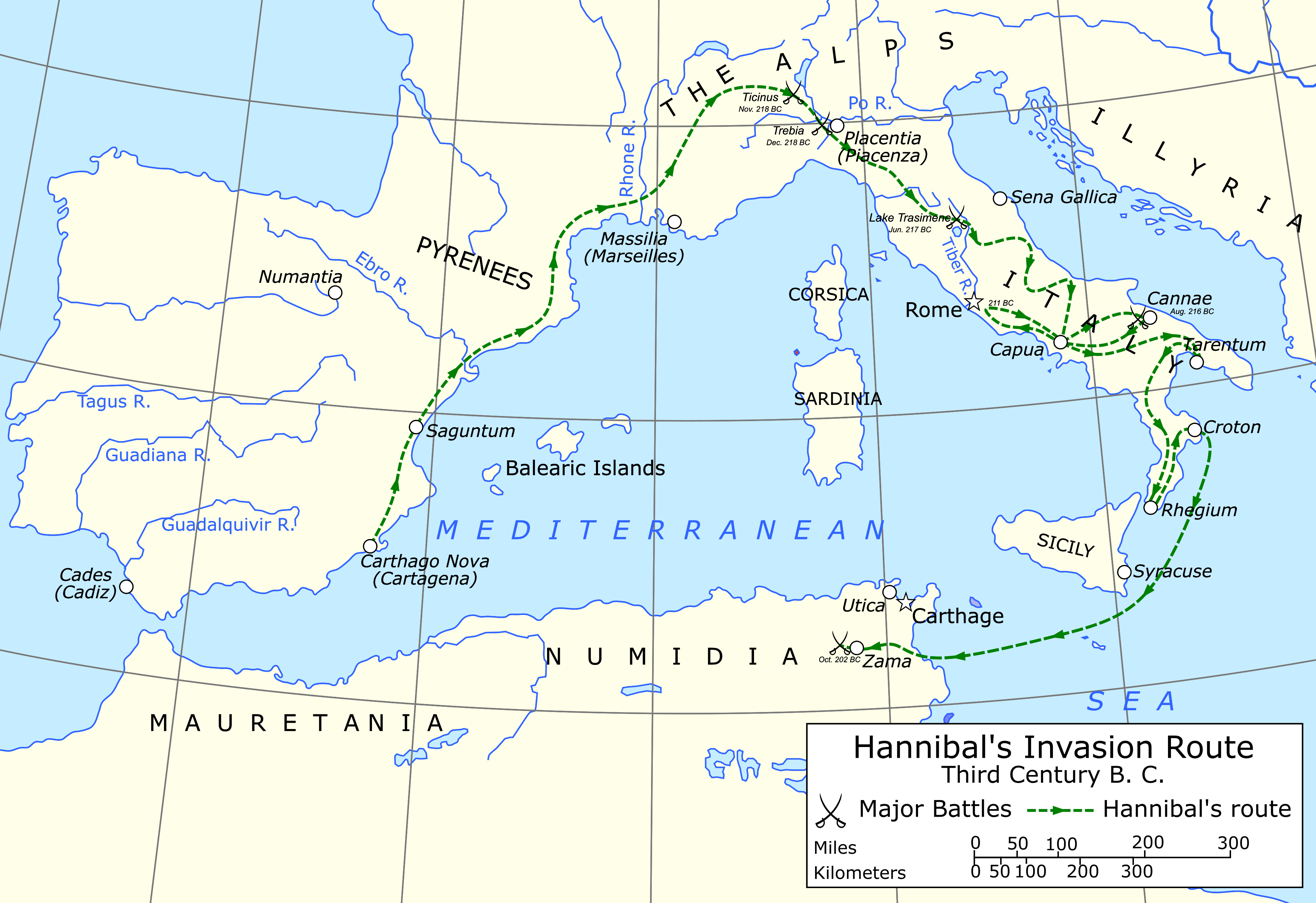
Hannibal's route from Iberia to Italy

During 218 BC there was some naval skirmishing in the waters around Sicily; the Romans repulsed a Carthaginian attack and captured the island of Malta. In Cisalpine Gaul (modern northern Italy), the major Gallic tribes attacked the Roman colonies there, causing the settlers to flee to their previously established colony of Mutina (modern Modena), where they were besieged. A Roman relief force broke through the siege, but was then ambushed and itself besieged. An army had previously been raised by the Romans to campaign in Iberia, but the Roman Senate detached one Roman and one allied legion from it to send to north Italy. Recruiting fresh troops to replace these delayed the army's departure for Iberia until September. At the same time a Roman army in Sicily under the consul Sempronius Longus was preparing for an invasion of Africa.

Early campaigns of the Second Punic War, 218 BC

Meanwhile, Hannibal assembled a Carthaginian army in New Carthage (modern Cartagena) and led it northwards along the Iberian coast in May or June. It entered Gaul and took an inland route, to avoid the Roman allies to the south. At the battle of the Rhône Crossing, Hannibal defeated a force of local Gauls which sought to bar his way. A Roman fleet carrying the Iberian-bound army landed at Rome's ally Massalia (modern Marseille) at the mouth of the Rhone, but Hannibal evaded the Romans and continued to Italy.

The Carthaginians reached the foot of the Alps by late autumn and crossed them in 15 days, surmounting the difficulties of climate, terrain and the guerrilla warfare tactics of the native Ligurians. Hannibal arrived in Cisalpine Gaul with 20,000 infantry, 6,000 cavalry and an unknown number of elephants – the survivors of the 37 with which he left Iberia – some time in November; the Romans had already gone into their winter quarters. Hannibal's surprise entry into the Italian peninsula led to the cancellation of Rome's planned campaign for the year: an invasion of Africa.

=== Carthaginian victories, 218–216 BC ===
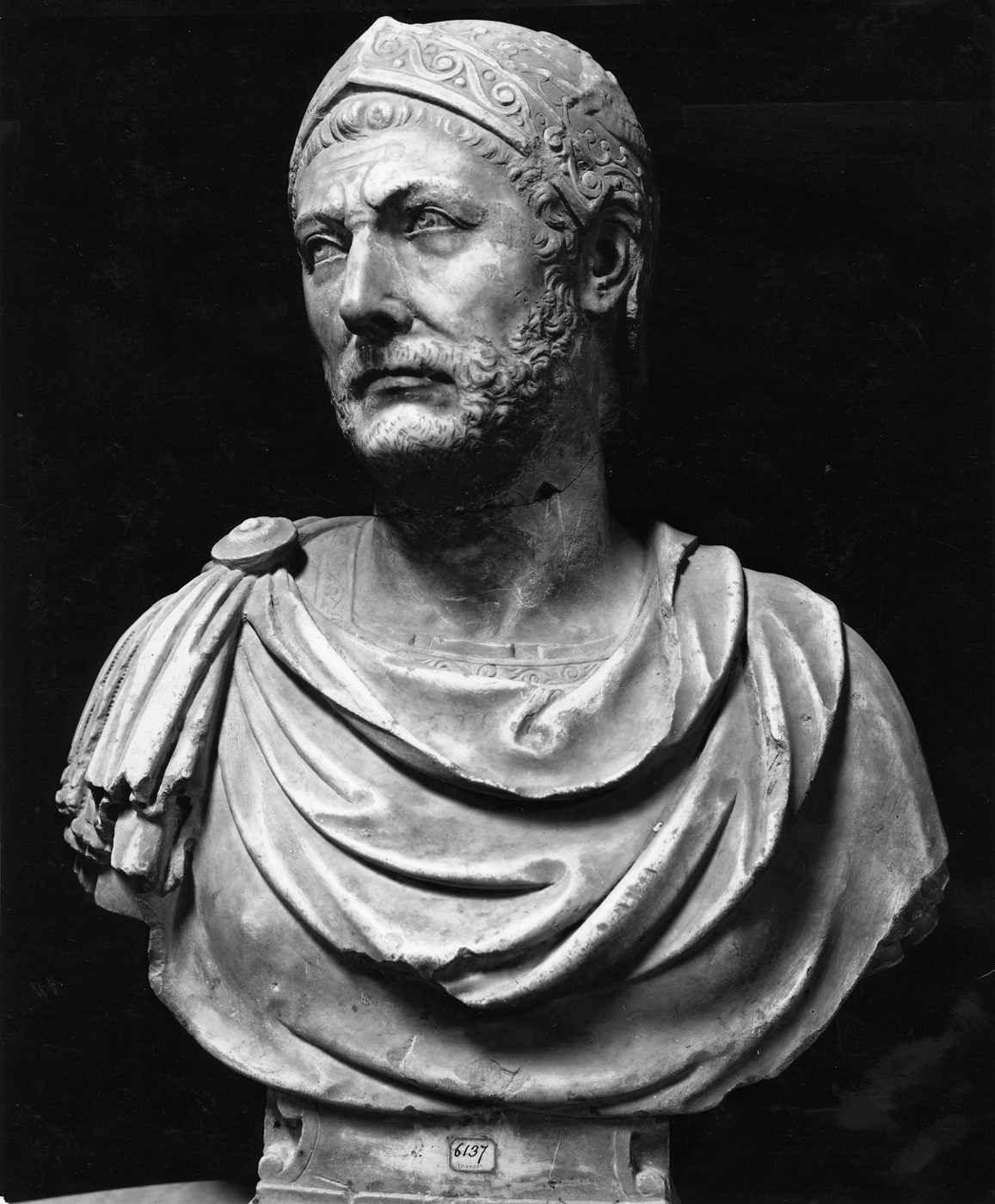
Hannibal, depicted in the Capuan bust

Shortly after arriving in Italy the Carthaginians captured the chief city of the hostile Taurini (in the area of modern Turin) and seized its food stocks. In late November 218 BC the Carthaginian cavalry routed the cavalry and light infantry of the Romans at the battle of Ticinus. As a result, most of the Gallic tribes declared for the Carthaginian cause and Hannibal's army grew to more than 40,000 men. The Senate ordered the army in Sicily north to join the force already facing Hannibal, thus abandoning the plan to invade Africa. The combined Roman force under the command of Sempronius was lured into combat by Hannibal on ground of his choosing at the battle of the Trebia. The Carthaginians encircled the Romans and only 10,000 out of 40,000 were able to fight their way to safety. Having secured his position in Cisalpine Gaul by this victory, Hannibal quartered his troops for the winter among the Gauls. The latter joined his army in large numbers, bringing it up to 60,000 men.

There was shock when news of the defeat reached Rome, but this calmed once Sempronius arrived, to preside over the consular elections in the usual manner. The consuls-elect recruited further legions, both Roman and from Rome's Latin allies; reinforced Sardinia and Sicily against the possibility of Carthaginian raids or invasion; placed garrisons at Tarentum and other places for similar reasons; built a fleet of 60 quinqueremes; and established supply depots at Ariminum and Arretium in preparation for marching north later in the year. Two armies of four legions each, two Roman and two allied but with stronger than usual cavalry contingents, were formed. One was stationed at Arretium and one on the Adriatic coast; they would be able to block Hannibal's possible advance into central Italy and were positioned to move north to operate in Cisalpine Gaul.

217 BCE: Hannibal advances through Italy.

In early spring 217 BC the Carthaginians crossed the Apennines unopposed, taking a difficult but unguarded route. Hannibal attempted to draw the main Roman army under Gaius Flaminius into a pitched battle by devastating the area they had been sent to protect provoking Flaminius into a hasty pursuit. Hannibal set an ambush and in the battle of Lake Trasimene completely defeated the Roman army, killing 15,000 Romans, including Flaminius, and taking 10,000 prisoners. A cavalry force of 4,000 from the other Roman army was also defeated at the battle of Umbrian Lake and annihilated. The prisoners were badly treated if they were Romans; captured Latin allies were well treated by the Carthaginians and many were freed and sent back to their cities, in the expectation they would speak well of Carthaginian martial prowess and of their treatment. Hannibal hoped some of these allies could be persuaded to defect.

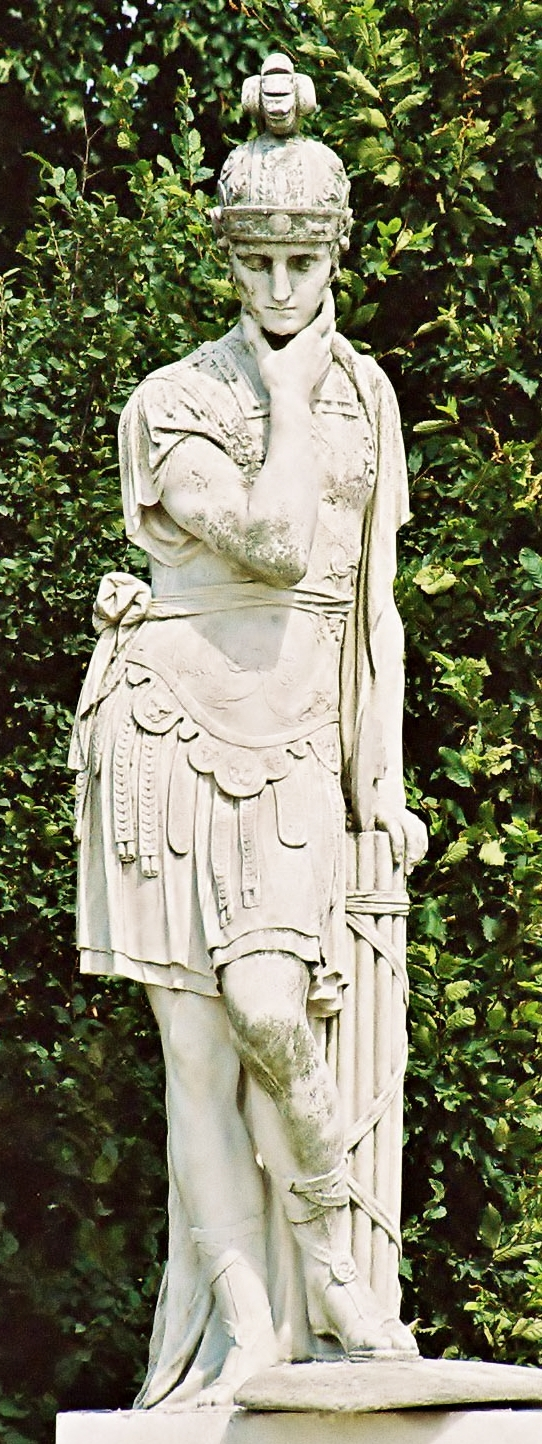
A 1777 statue of Fabius

The Carthaginians continued their march through Etruria, then Umbria, to the Adriatic coast, then turned south into Apulia, hoping to win over some of the ethnic Greek and Italic cities of southern Italy. News of the defeat again caused a panic in Rome. The head of the embassy that was sent to Carthage right before the war broke out in 218 BC, Quintus Fabius Maximus, was elected dictator by the Roman Assembly and adopted the "Fabian strategy" of avoiding pitched battles, relying instead on low-level harassment to wear the invader down, until Rome could rebuild its military strength. Hannibal was left largely free to ravage Apulia for the next year.

Fabius was unpopular at this period with parts of the Roman army, public and the senate, for avoiding battle while Italy was being devastated by the enemy: there was awareness that his tactics would not lead to a quick end to the war. Hannibal marched through the richest and most fertile provinces of Italy, hoping the devastation would draw Fabius into battle, but Fabius refused. The Roman populace derided Fabius as "the Delayer" (in Latin, Cunctator) and in 216 BC elected new consuls: Gaius Terentius Varro, who advocated pursuing a more aggressive war strategy, and Lucius Aemilius Paullus, who advocated a strategy somewhere between Fabius's and that suggested by Varro.

In the spring of 216 BC Hannibal seized the large supply depot at Cannae on the Apulian plain. The Roman Senate authorised the raising of double-sized armies by Varro and Paullus, a force of 86,000 men, the largest in Roman history up to that point. Paullus and Varro marched southward to confront Hannibal and encamped 10 km (6 mi) away. Hannibal accepted battle on the open plain between the armies in the battle of Cannae. The Roman legions forced their way through Hannibal's deliberately weak centre, but Libyan heavy infantry on the wings swung around their advance, menacing their flanks. Hasdrubal Gisco (Note: Not the same man as Hasdrubal Barca, one of Hannibal's younger brothers.) led the Carthaginian cavalry on the left wing and routed the Roman cavalry opposite, then swept around the rear of the Romans to attack their cavalry on the other wing. The heavily outnumbered Carthaginian infantry held out until Hasdrubal charged into the legions from behind. As a result, the Roman infantry was surrounded with no means of escape. At least 67,500 Romans were killed or captured.

Miles describes Cannae as "Rome's greatest military disaster". Toni Ñaco del Hoyo describes the Trebia, Lake Trasimene and Cannae as the three "great military calamities" suffered by the Romans in the first three years of the war. Brian Carey writes that these three defeats brought Rome to the brink of collapse. Within a few weeks of Cannae a Roman army of 25,000 was ambushed by Boii Gauls in Cisalpine Gaul at the battle of Silva Litana and annihilated. Fabius became consul in 215 BC and was re-elected in 214 BC.

=== Roman allies defect, 216–214 BC ===
Little has survived of Polybius's account of Hannibal's army in Italy after Cannae. Livy gives a fuller record, but according to Goldsworthy "his reliability is often suspect", especially with regard to his descriptions of battles; many modern historians agree, but nevertheless his is the best surviving source for this part of the war.

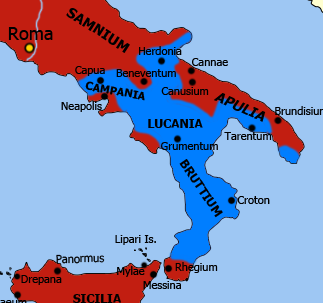
Hannibal's allies in southern Italy c. 213 BC, shown in blue

Several of the city states in southern Italy allied with Hannibal, or were captured when pro-Carthaginian factions betrayed their defenses. These included the large city of Capua and the major port city of Tarentum (modern Taranto). Two of the major Samnite tribes also joined the Carthaginian cause. By 214 BC the bulk of southern Italy had turned against Rome, although there were many exceptions and the majority of Rome's allies in central Italy remained loyal. All except the smallest towns were too well fortified for Hannibal to take by assault, and blockade could be a long-drawn-out affair, or if the target was a port, impossible. Carthage's new allies felt little sense of community with Carthage, or even with each other. They increased the number of places which Hannibal's army was expected to defend from Roman retribution, but provided relatively few fresh troops to assist him in doing so. Such Italian forces as were raised resisted operating away from their home cities and performed poorly when they did.

Events of Winter 216–215 BC

An important part of Hannibal's campaign in Italy was to attempt to fight the Romans by using local resources; raising recruits from among the local population. His subordinate Hanno was able to raise troops in Samnium in 214 BC, but the Romans intercepted these new levies in the battle of Beneventum and eliminated them before they rendezvoused with Hannibal. Hannibal could win allies, but defending them against the Romans was a new and difficult problem, as the Romans could still field multiple armies, which in total greatly outnumbered his own forces.

Himilco's campaigns in Bruttium, 215 BC

The greatest gain was the second largest city of Italy, Capua, when Hannibal's army marched into Campania in 216 BC. The inhabitants of Capua held limited Roman citizenship and the aristocracy was linked to the Romans via marriage and friendship, but the possibility of becoming the supreme city of Italy after the evident Roman disasters proved too strong a temptation. The treaty between them and Hannibal can be described as an agreement of friendship, since the Capuans had no obligations. When the port city of Locri defected to Carthage in the summer of 215 BC it was immediately used to reinforce the Carthaginian forces in Italy with soldiers, supplies and war elephants. It was the only time during the war Carthage reinforced Hannibal. A second force, under Hannibal's youngest brother Mago, was meant to land in Italy in 215 BC but was diverted to Iberia after a major Carthaginian defeat there.

Meanwhile, the Romans took drastic steps to raise new legions: enrolling slaves, criminals and those who did not meet the usual property qualification. By early 215 BC they were fielding at least 12 legions; by 214 BC 18; and by 213 BC 22. By 212 BC the full complement of the legions deployed would have been in excess of 100,000 men, plus, as always, a similar number of allied troops. The majority were deployed in southern Italy in field armies of approximately 20,000 men each. This was insufficient to challenge Hannibal's army in open battle, but sufficient to force him to concentrate his forces and to hamper his movements.

=== Macedonia, Sardinia and Sicily ===
During 215 BC the Macedonian king, Philip V, pledged his support to Hannibal, initiating the First Macedonian War against Rome in 215 BC. The Romans were concerned that the Macedonians would attempt to cross the Strait of Otranto and land in Italy. They strongly reinforced their navy in the area and despatched a legion to stand guard, and the threat petered out. In 211 BC Rome contained the Macedonians by allying with the Aetolian League, a coalition of Greek city states which was already at war with Macedonia. In 205 BC this war ended with a negotiated peace.

A rebellion in support of the Carthaginians broke out on Sardinia in 213 BC, but it was quickly put down by the Romans.

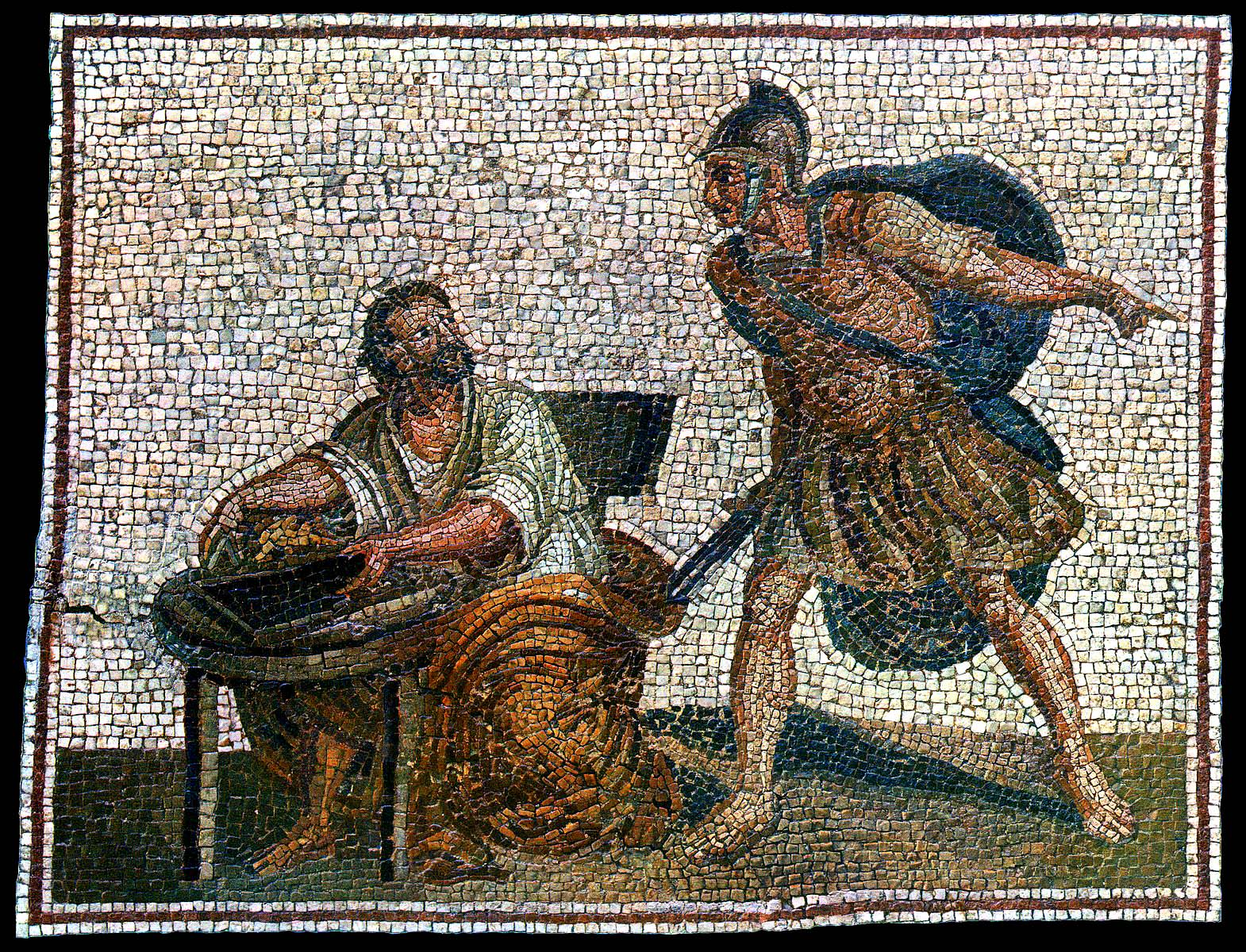
Archimedes before being killed by the Roman soldier – copy of a Roman mosaic from the 2nd century

Prior to 215 BC Sicily remained firmly in Roman hands, blocking the ready seaborne reinforcement and resupply of Hannibal from Carthage. Hiero II, the old tyrant of Syracuse of forty-five-years standing and a staunch Roman ally, died in 215 BC and his successor Hieronymus was discontented with his situation. Hannibal negotiated a treaty whereby Syracuse came over to Carthage, at the price of making the whole of Sicily a Syracusan possession. The Syracusan army proved no match for a Roman army led by Claudius Marcellus and by spring 213 BC Syracuse was besieged. Both Polybius' and Livy's accounts of the siege focus on Archimedes' invention of war machines to counteract Roman siege warfare, which was already made difficult by the strong defences of the city.

A large Carthaginian army led by Himilco was sent to relieve the city in 213 BC and several further Sicilian cities deserted the Romans. In the spring of 212 BC the Romans stormed Syracuse in a surprise night assault and captured several districts of the city. Meanwhile, the Carthaginian army was crippled by plague. After the Carthaginians failed to resupply the city, the rest of Syracuse fell in the autumn of 212 BC; Archimedes was killed by a Roman soldier.

Carthage sent more reinforcements to Sicily in 211 BC and went on the offensive. In 211 BC Hannibal sent a force of Numidian cavalry to Sicily, which was led by the skilled Liby-Phoenician officer Mottones, who inflicted heavy losses on the Roman army through hit-and-run attacks. A fresh Roman army attacked the main Carthaginian stronghold on the island, Agrigentum, in 210 BC and the city was betrayed to the Romans by a discontented Carthaginian officer. The remaining Carthaginian-controlled towns then surrendered or were taken through force or treachery and the Sicilian grain supply to Rome and its armies was resumed.

=== Italy, 213–208 BC ===
For 11 years after Cannae the war surged around southern Italy as cities went over to the Carthaginians or were taken by subterfuge and the Romans recaptured them by siege or by suborning factions within to give them entry. Hannibal repeatedly defeated Roman armies, but wherever his main army was not active the Romans threatened Carthaginian-supporting towns or sought battle with Carthaginian or Carthaginian-allied detachments; frequently with success. By 208 BC many of the cities and territories which had joined the Carthaginian cause had returned to their Roman allegiance.

Fabius captured the Carthaginian-allied town Arpi in 213 BC. In 212 BC Hannibal destroyed the Roman army of Centenius Penula at the battle of the Silarus in northwest Lucania. Later the same year, Hannibal defeated another Roman army at the battle of Herdonia, with 16,000 men lost from a force of 18,000. Despite these losses, the Romans besieged Capua, the Carthaginians' key ally in Italy. Hannibal offered battle to the Romans; Livy's account of the subsequent fighting is unclear, but the Romans seem to have suffered heavy casualties while the Carthaginians were unable to lift the siege. Hannibal then assaulted the Romans' siege works, but was again unable to relieve the city. In 211 BC Hannibal again offered battle to the besieging Roman forces, this time they declined to leave their fortifications. In desperation Hannibal again assaulted them and again failed to break through. He next marched his army towards Rome, hoping to compel the Romans to abandon the siege to defend it; however, the besieging force stayed in place and Capua fell soon afterwards. The city was stripped of its political autonomy and placed under Roman appointees.

In 210 the Carthaginians caught a Roman army off guard outside Herdonia, heavily defeating it after its commander accepted battle. Livy then has Hannibal fighting the inconclusive battle of Numistro, although modern historians doubt his account. The Romans stayed on Hannibal's heels, fighting another pitched battle at Canusium in 209 BC and again suffering heavy losses. This battle enabled another Roman army to approach Tarentum and capture it by treachery.

=== Italy, 207–203 BC ===
In the spring of 207 BC Hasdrubal Barca repeated the feat of his elder brother by marching an army across the Alps. He invaded Cisalpine Gaul with an army of 35,000 men, intending to join forces with Hannibal, but Hannibal was unaware of his presence. The Romans facing Hannibal in southern Italy tricked him into believing the whole Roman army was still in camp, while a large portion marched north under the consul Claudius Nero. They reinforced the Romans under the second consul, Marcus Salinator, who were already facing Hasdrubal. This combined Roman force attacked at the battle of the Metaurus and destroyed the Carthaginian army, killing Hasdrubal. This battle confirmed Roman dominance in Italy and marked the end of their Fabian strategy. Without the expected reinforcement Hannibal's forces were compelled to evacuate allied towns and withdraw to Bruttium.

In 205 BC, Mago Barca, another of Hannibal's younger brothers, landed in Genua in north-west Italy with the remnants of his Spanish army. It soon received Gallic and Ligurian reinforcements. Mago's arrival in the north of the Italian peninsula was followed by Hannibal's inconclusive battle of Crotona in 204 BC in the far south of the peninsula. Mago marched his reinforced army towards the lands of Carthage's main Gallic allies in Cisalpine Gaul, but was checked by a large Roman army and defeated at the battle of Insubria in 203 BC.

After a Roman army invaded the Carthaginian homeland in 204 BC, defeating the Carthaginians in two major battles and winning the allegiance of the Numidian kingdoms of North Africa, Hannibal and the remnants of his army were recalled. They sailed from Croton and landed at Carthage with 15,000–20,000 experienced veterans. Mago was also recalled; he died of wounds on the voyage and some of his ships were intercepted by the Romans, but 12,000 of his troops reached Carthage.

== Iberia ==
=== Iberia 218–211 BC ===
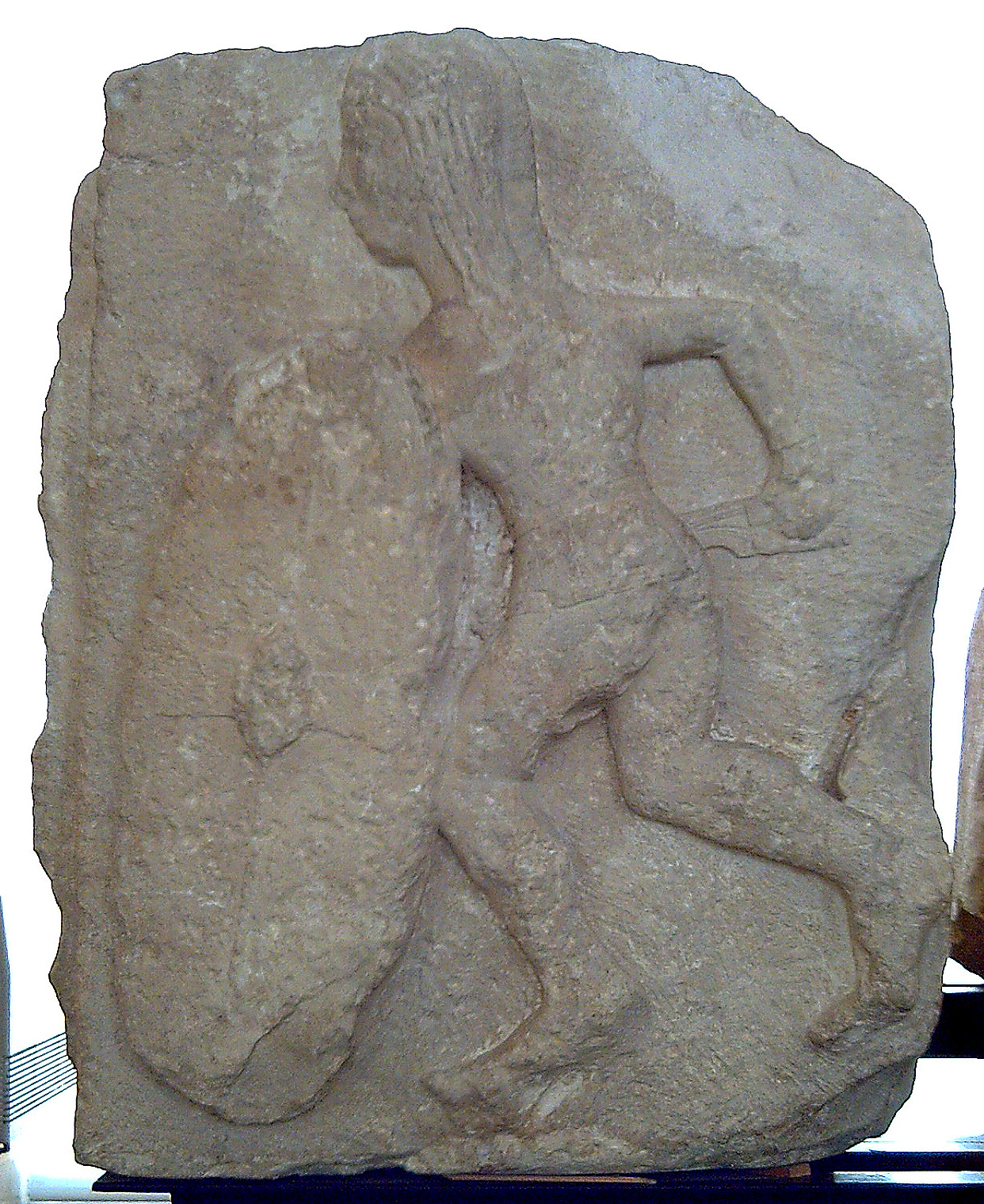
An Iberian warrior from bas-relief c. 200 BC. He is armed with a falcata and an oval shield.

The Roman fleet continued on from Massala in the autumn of 218 BC, landing the army it was transporting in north-east Iberia, where it won support among the local tribes. The Romans' lodgement between the Ebro and the Pyrenees blocked the route from Iberia to Italy, making the despatch of reinforcements from Iberia to Hannibal difficult. A Carthaginian attack in late 218 BC was repelled at the battle of Cissa. In 217 BC 40 Carthaginian and Iberian warships were beaten by 35 Roman and Massalian vessels at the battle of Ebro River, with the loss of 29 Carthaginian ships.

In 216 Hasdrubal received orders from Carthage to move into Italy and join up with Hannibal to put pressure on the Romans in their homeland. Hasdrubal demurred, arguing that Carthaginian authority over the Iberian tribes was too fragile and the Roman forces in the area too strong for him to execute the planned movement. In 215 Hasdrubal eventually acted, besieging a pro-Roman town and offering battle at Dertosa, where he attempted to use his cavalry superiority to clear the flanks of the Roman army while enveloping their centre on both sides with his infantry. However, the Romans broke through the centre of the Carthaginian line and then defeated each wing separately, inflicting severe losses. It was no longer possible for Hasdrubal to reinforce Hannibal in Italy.

The Carthaginians suffered a wave of defections of local Celtiberian tribes to Rome. The Roman commanders captured Saguntum in 212 BC and in 211 BC hired 20,000 Celtiberian mercenaries to reinforce their army. Observing that the Carthaginian forces in Iberia were divided into three armies which were deployed apart from each other, the Romans split their forces. This strategy resulted in two separate battles in 211, usually referred to jointly as the battle of the Upper Baetis. Both battles ended in complete defeat for the Romans, as Hasdrubal had bribed the Romans' mercenaries to desert. The Roman survivors retreated to their coastal stronghold north of the Ebro, from which the Carthaginians again failed to expel them. Claudius Nero brought over reinforcements in 210 BC and stabilised the situation.

=== Iberia, 211–205 BC ===
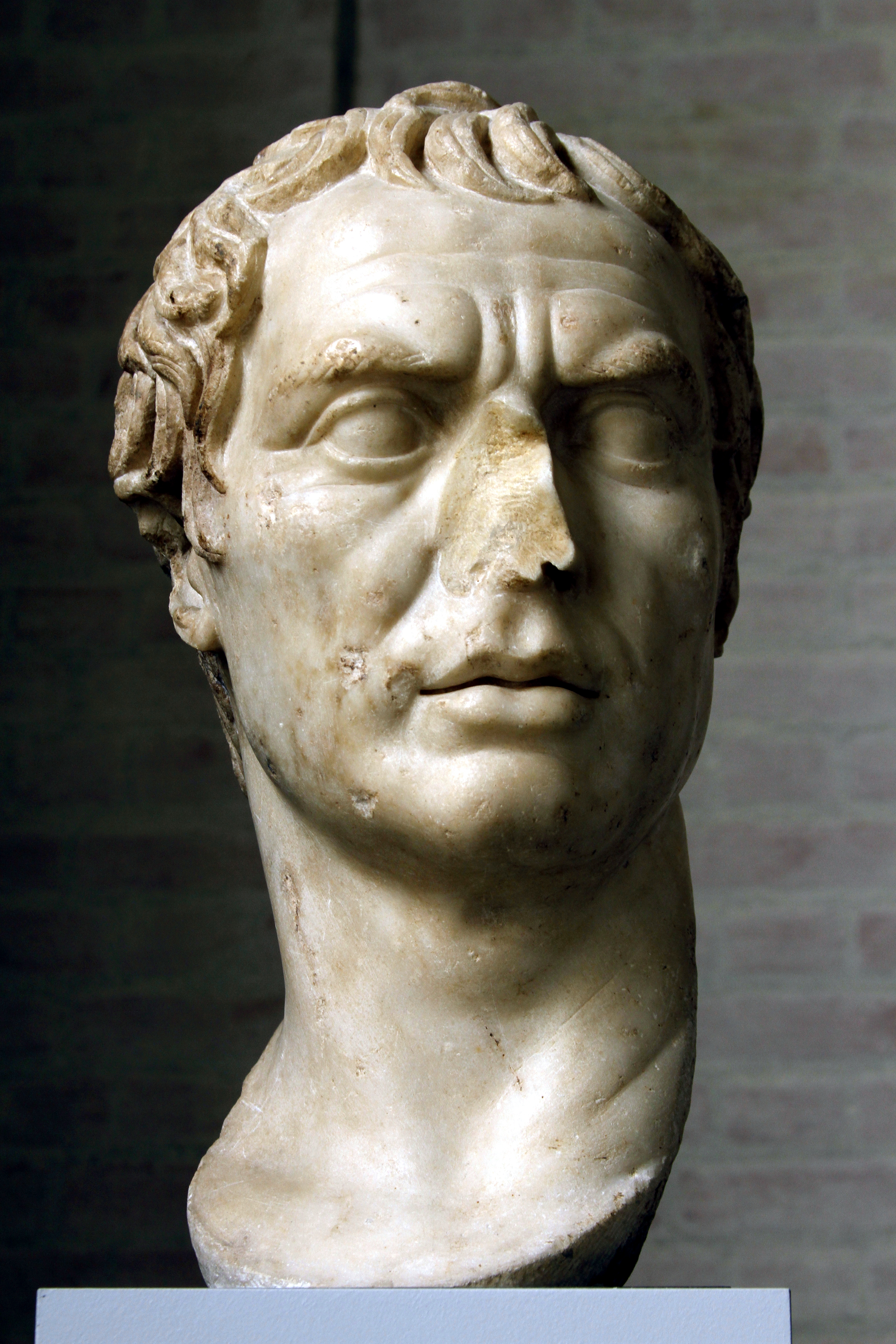
2nd century BC marble bust of the younger Scipio, Glyptoteket

In 210 BC Publius Cornelius Scipio, (Note: Publius Scipio was the bereaved son of the previous Roman co-commander in Iberia, also named Publius Scipio, and the nephew of the other co-commander, Gnaeus Scipio.) arrived in Iberia with further Roman reinforcements. In a carefully planned assault in 209 BC he captured the lightly defended centre of Carthaginian power in Iberia, New Carthage, seizing a vast booty of gold, silver and siege artillery. He released the captured population and liberated the Iberian hostages held there by the Carthaginians, in an attempt to ensure the loyalty of their tribes.

In the spring of 208 BC Hasdrubal moved to engage Scipio at the battle of Baecula. The Carthaginians were defeated, but Hasdrubal was able to withdraw the majority of his army and prevent any Roman pursuit; most of his losses were among his Iberian allies. Scipio was not able to prevent Hasdrubal from leading his depleted army over the western passes of the Pyrenees into Gaul. In 207 BC, after recruiting heavily in Gaul, Hasdrubal crossed the Alps into Italy in an attempt to join his brother, Hannibal, but was defeated before he could.

In 206 BC, at the battle of Ilipa, Scipio with 48,000 men, half Italian and half Iberian, defeated a Carthaginian army of 54,500 men and 32 elephants. This sealed the fate of the Carthaginians in Iberia. The last Carthaginian-held city in Iberia, Gades, defected to the Romans. Later the same year a mutiny broke out among Roman troops, which attracted support from Iberian leaders, disappointed that Roman forces had remained in the peninsula after the expulsion of the Carthaginians, but it was put down by Scipio. In 205 BC an attempt was made by Mago to recapture New Carthage when the Roman occupiers were shaken by another mutiny and an Iberian uprising, but he was repulsed. Mago left Iberia for northern Italy with his remaining forces. In 203 BC Carthage succeeded in recruiting at least 4,000 mercenaries from Iberia, despite Rome's nominal control.

== Africa ==
=== Africa, 213–206 BC ===
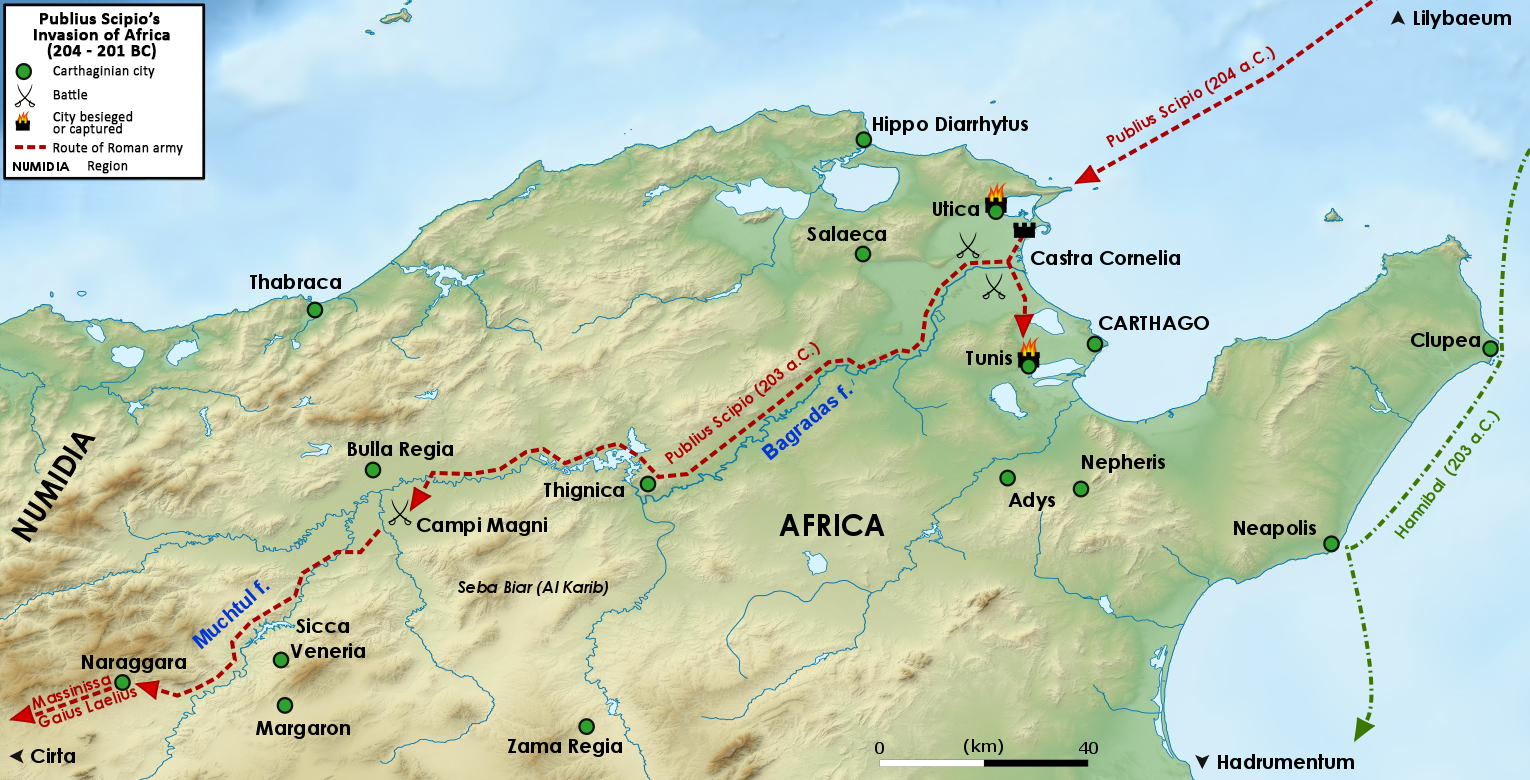
Scipio's military campaign in Africa (204–203 BC)

In 213 BC Syphax, a powerful Numidian king in North Africa, declared for Rome. In response Carthaginian troops were sent to North Africa from Spain. In 206 BC the Carthaginians ended this drain on their resources by dividing several Numidian kingdoms with Syphax. One of those disinherited was the Numidian prince Masinissa, who was thus driven into the arms of Rome.

=== Roman invasion of Africa, 204–201 BC ===
In 205 BC Publius Scipio was given command of the legions in Sicily and allowed to enrol volunteers for his plan to end the war by an invasion of Africa. After landing in Africa in 204 BC he was joined by Masinissa and a force of Numidian cavalry. Scipio twice gave battle and destroyed two large Carthaginian armies. After the second encounter Syphax was pursued and taken prisoner by Masinissa at the battle of Cirta; Masinissa then seized most of Syphax's kingdom with Roman help.

Rome and Carthage entered into peace negotiations and Carthage recalled both Hannibal and Mago from Italy. The Roman Senate ratified a draft treaty, but because of mistrust and a surge in confidence when Hannibal arrived from Italy, Carthage repudiated it. Hannibal was placed in command of another army, formed from his veterans from Italy and newly raised troops from Africa, but with few cavalry. The decisive battle of Zama followed in October 202 BC. Unlike most battles of the Second Punic War, the Romans had superiority in cavalry and the Carthaginians in infantry. Hannibal attempted to use 80 elephants to break into the Roman infantry formation, but the Romans countered them effectively and the elephants routed back through the Carthaginian ranks. The Roman and allied Numidian cavalry then pressed their attacks and drove the Carthaginian cavalry from the field. The two sides' infantry fought inconclusively until the Roman cavalry returned and attacked the Carthaginian rear. The Carthaginian formation collapsed; Hannibal was one of the few to escape the field.

== Roman victory ==
The new peace treaty dictated by Rome stripped Carthage of all of its overseas territories and some of its African ones. An indemnity of 10,000 talents of silver was to be paid over 50 years and hostages were taken. (Note: 10,000 talents was approximately 269,000 kilograms (265 long tons).) Carthage was forbidden to possess war elephants and its fleet was restricted to ten warships. It was prohibited from waging war outside Africa and in Africa only with Rome's permission. Many senior Carthaginians wanted to reject the treaty but Hannibal spoke strongly in its favour and it was accepted in spring 201 BC. Henceforth it was clear Carthage was politically subordinate to Rome. Scipio was awarded a triumph and received the agnomen "Africanus".

Rome's African ally, King Masinissa of Numidia, exploited the prohibition on Carthage waging war to repeatedly raid and seize Carthaginian territory with impunity. In 149 BC, fifty years after the end of the Second Punic War, Carthage sent an army, under Hasdrubal, against Masinissa, the treaty notwithstanding. The campaign ended in disaster at the battle of Oroscopa and anti-Carthaginian factions in Rome used the illicit military action as a pretext to prepare a punitive expedition. The Third Punic War began later in 149 BC when a large Roman army landed in North Africa and besieged Carthage. In the spring of 146 BC the Romans launched their final assault, systematically destroying the city and killing its inhabitants; 50,000 survivors were sold into slavery. The formerly Carthaginian territories became the Roman province of Africa. It was a century before the site of Carthage was rebuilt as a Roman city.

== Notes, citations and sources ==
=== Sources ===
- Bagnall, Nigel (1999). The Punic Wars: Rome, Carthage and the Struggle for the Mediterranean. London: Pimlico. ISBN 978-0-7126-6608-4.
- Beck, Hans (2015) [2011]. "The Reasons for War". In Hoyos, Dexter (ed.). A Companion to the Punic Wars. Chichester, West Sussex: John Wiley. pp. 225–241. ISBN 978-1-119-02550-4.
- Barceló, Pedro (2015) [2011]. "Punic Politics, Economy, and Alliances, 218–201". In Hoyos, Dexter (ed.). A Companion to the Punic Wars. Chichester, West Sussex: John Wiley. pp. 357–375. ISBN 978-1-119-02550-4.
- Brizzi, Giovanni (2007). Scipione e Annibale, la guerra per salvare Roma. Bari-Roma: Laterza. ISBN 978-88-420-8332-0.
- Le Bohec, Yann (2015) [2011]. "The "Third Punic War": The Siege of Carthage (148–146 BC)". In Hoyos, Dexter (ed.). A Companion to the Punic Wars. Chichester, West Sussex: John Wiley. pp. 430–446. ISBN 978-1-1190-2550-4.
- Briscoe, John (2006) [1989]. "The Second Punic War". In Astin, A. E.; Walbank, F. W.; Frederiksen, M. W.; Ogilvie, R. M. (eds.). The Cambridge Ancient History: Rome and the Mediterranean to 133 B.C. Vol. VIII. Cambridge: Cambridge University Press. pp. 44–80. ISBN 978-0-521-23448-1.
- Carey, Brian Todd (2007). Hannibal's Last Battle: Zama & the Fall of Carthage. Barnslet, South Yorkshire: Pen & Sword. ISBN 978-1-84415-635-1.
- Castillo, Dennis Angelo (2006). The Maltese Cross: A Strategic History of Malta. Westport, Connecticut: Greenwood Publishing Group. ISBN 978-0-313-32329-4.
- Champion, Craige B. (2015) [2011]. "Polybius and the Punic Wars". In Hoyos, Dexter (ed.). A Companion to the Punic Wars. Chichester, West Sussex: John Wiley. pp. 95–110. ISBN 978-1-1190-2550-4.
- Coarelli, Filippo (2002). "I ritratti di 'Mario' e 'Silla' a Monaco e il sepolcro degli Scipioni". Eutopia Nuova Serie (in Italian). II (1): 47–75. ISSN 1121-1628.
- Collins, Roger (1998). Spain: An Oxford Archaeological Guide. Oxford: Oxford University Press. ISBN 978-0-19-285300-4.
- Curry, Andrew (2012). "The Weapon that Changed History". Archaeology. 65 (1): 32–37. JSTOR 41780760.
- Dupuy, R. Ernest; Dupuy, Trevor N. (1993). The Harper Encyclopedia of Military History. New York City: HarperCollins. ISBN 978-0-06-270056-8.
- Eckstein, Arthur (2006). Mediterranean Anarchy, Interstate War, and the Rise of Rome. Berkeley: University of California Press. ISBN 978-0-520-24618-8.
- Edwell, Peter (2015) [2011]. "War Abroad: Spain, Sicily, Macedon, Africa". In Hoyos, Dexter (ed.). A Companion to the Punic Wars. Chichester, West Sussex: John Wiley. pp. 320–338. ISBN 978-1-119-02550-4.
- Erdkamp, Paul (2015) [2011]. "Manpower and Food Supply in the First and Second Punic Wars". In Hoyos, Dexter (ed.). A Companion to the Punic Wars. Chichester, West Sussex: John Wiley. pp. 58–76. ISBN 978-1-1190-2550-4.
- Etcheto, Henri (2012). Les Scipions. Famille et pouvoir à Rome à l'époque républicaine (in French). Bordeaux: Ausonius Éditions. ISBN 978-2-35613-073-0.
- Fronda, Michael P. (2015) [2011]. "Hannibal: Tactics, Strategy, and Geostrategy". In Hoyos, Dexter (ed.). A Companion to the Punic Wars. Oxford: Wiley-Blackwell. pp. 242–259. ISBN 978-1-405-17600-2.
- Goldsworthy, Adrian (2006) [2000]. The Fall of Carthage: The Punic Wars 265–146 BC. London: Phoenix. ISBN 978-0-304-36642-2.
- Hau, Lisa (2016). Moral History from Herodotus to Diodorus Siculus. Edinburgh: Edinburgh University Press. ISBN 978-1-4744-1107-3.
- Hoyos, Dexter (2000). "Towards a Chronology of the 'Truceless War', 241–237 B.C.". Rheinisches Museum für Philologie. 143 (3/4): 369–380. JSTOR 41234468.
- Hoyos, Dexter (2007). Truceless War: Carthage's Fight for Survival, 241 to 237 BC. Leiden; Boston: Brill. ISBN 978-90-474-2192-4.
- Hoyos, Dexter (2015) [2011]. A Companion to the Punic Wars. Chichester, West Sussex: John Wiley. ISBN 978-1-1190-2550-4.
- Hoyos, Dexter (2015b). Mastering the West: Rome and Carthage at War. Oxford: Oxford University Press. ISBN 978-0-19-986010-4.
- Jones, Archer (1987). The Art of War in the Western World. Urbana: University of Illinois Press. ISBN 978-0-252-01380-5.
- Koon, Sam (2015) [2011]. "Phalanx and Legion: the "Face" of Punic War Battle". In Hoyos, Dexter (ed.). A Companion to the Punic Wars. Chichester, West Sussex: John Wiley. pp. 77–94. ISBN 978-1-1190-2550-4.
- Kunze, Claudia (2015) [2011]. "Carthage and Numidia, 201–149". In Hoyos, Dexter (ed.). A Companion to the Punic Wars. Chichester, West Sussex: John Wiley. pp. 395–411. ISBN 978-1-1190-2550-4.
- Lazenby, John (1996). The First Punic War: A Military History. Stanford, California: Stanford University Press. ISBN 978-0-8047-2673-3.
- Lazenby, John (1998). Hannibal's War: A Military History of the Second Punic War. Warminster: Aris & Phillips. ISBN 978-0-85668-080-9.
- Liddell Hart, Basil (1967). Strategy: The Indirect Approach. London: Penguin. OCLC 470715409.
- Lomas, Kathryn (2015) [2011]. "Rome, Latins, and Italians in the Second Punic War". In Hoyos, Dexter (ed.). A Companion to the Punic Wars. Chichester, West Sussex: John Wiley. pp. 339–356. ISBN 978-1-119-02550-4.
- Mahaney, W.C. (2008). Hannibal's Odyssey: Environmental Background to the Alpine Invasion of Italia. Piscataway, New Jersey: Gorgias Press. ISBN 978-1-59333-951-7.
- Miles, Richard (2011). Carthage Must be Destroyed. London: Penguin. ISBN 978-0-14-101809-6.
- Mineo, Bernard (2015) [2011]. "Principal Literary Sources for the Punic Wars (apart from Polybius)". In Hoyos, Dexter (ed.). A Companion to the Punic Wars. Chichester, West Sussex: John Wiley. pp. 111–128. ISBN 978-1-1190-2550-4.
- Ñaco del Hoyo, Toni (2015) [2011]. "Roman Economy, Finance, and Politics in the Second Punic War". In Hoyos, Dexter (ed.). A Companion to the Punic Wars. Chichester, West Sussex: John Wiley. pp. 376–392. ISBN 978-1-1190-2550-4.
- Purcell, Nicholas (1995). "On the Sacking of Carthage and Corinth". In Innes, Doreen; Hine, Harry & Pelling, Christopher (eds.). Ethics and Rhetoric: Classical Essays for Donald Russell on his Seventy Fifth Birthday. Oxford: Clarendon. pp. 133–148. ISBN 978-0-19-814962-0.
- Rawlings, Louis (2015) [2011]. "The War in Italy, 218–203". In Hoyos, Dexter (ed.). A Companion to the Punic Wars. Chichester, West Sussex: John Wiley. pp. 58–76. ISBN 978-1-1190-2550-4.
- Richardson, John (2015) [2011]. "Spain, Africa, and Rome after Carthage". In Hoyos, Dexter (ed.). A Companion to the Punic Wars. Chichester, West Sussex: John Wiley. pp. 467–482. ISBN 978-1-1190-2550-4.
- Roberts, Mike (2017). Hannibal's Road: The Second Punic War in Italy 213–203 BC. Pen & Sword: Barnsley, South Yorkshire. ISBN 978-1-47385-595-3.
- Sabin, Philip (1996). "The Mechanics of Battle in the Second Punic War". Bulletin of the Institute of Classical Studies. Supplement. 67 (67): 59–79. JSTOR 43767903.
- Scullard, Howard (1955). "Carthage". Greece & Rome. 2 (3): 98–107. doi:10.1017/S0017383500022166. JSTOR 641578. S2CID 248519024.
- Scullard, Howard H. (2002). A History of the Roman World, 753 to 146 BC. London: Routledge. ISBN 978-0-415-30504-4.
- Scullard, Howard H. (2006) [1989]. "Carthage and Rome". In Walbank, F. W.; Astin, A. E.; Frederiksen, M. W. & Ogilvie, R. M. (eds.). Cambridge Ancient History: Volume 7, Part 2, 2nd Edition. Cambridge: Cambridge University Press. pp. 486–569. ISBN 978-0-521-23446-7.
- Shutt, Rowland (1938). "Polybius: A Sketch". Greece & Rome. 8 (22): 50–57. doi:10.1017/S001738350000588X. JSTOR 642112. S2CID 162905667.
- Sidwell, Keith C.; Jones, Peter V. (1998). The World of Rome: an Introduction to Roman Culture. Cambridge: Cambridge University Press. ISBN 978-0-521-38600-5.
- Walbank, F.W. (1990). Polybius. Vol. 1. Berkeley: University of California Press. ISBN 978-0-520-06981-7.
- Warmington, Brian (1993) [1960]. Carthage. New York: Barnes & Noble, Inc. ISBN 978-1-56619-210-1.
- Zimmermann, Klaus (2015) [2011]. "Roman Strategy and Aims in the Second Punic War". In Hoyos, Dexter (ed.). A Companion to the Punic Wars. Oxford: Wiley-Blackwell. pp. 280–298. ISBN 978-1-405-17600-2.
