= Hannibal =

Carthaginian general and statesman (247–183/181 BC)

- 𐤇𐤍𐤁𐤏𐤋
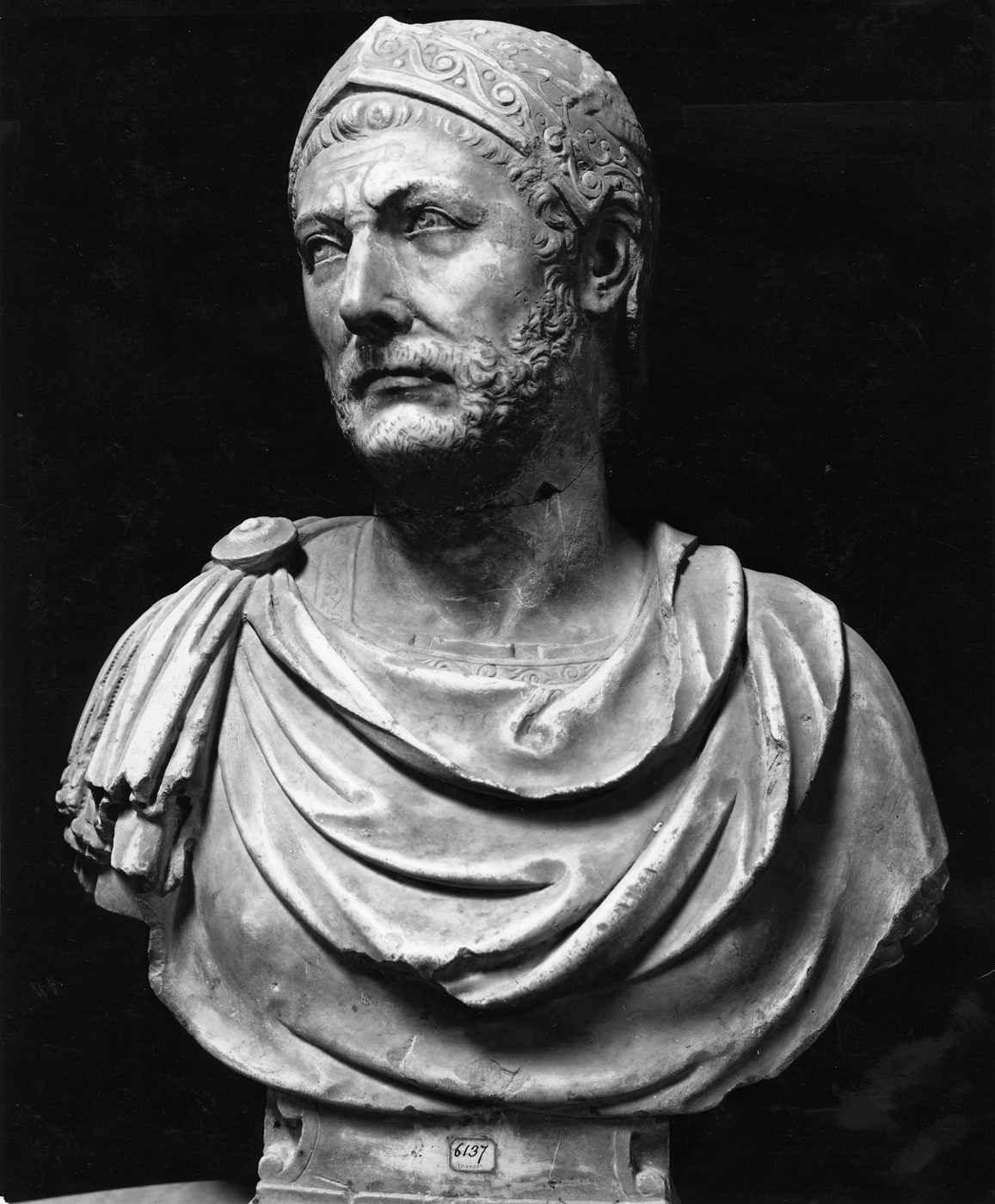
- The Capuan bust, reputedly of Hannibal
- Born: 247 BC; Carthage, Carthaginian Empire
- Died: 183–181 BC (aged between 64–66); Libyssa, Bithynia
- Spouse: Imilce
- Children: Possibly a son (Haspar)
- Relatives: Hamilcar Barca (father); Hasdrubal (brother); Mago (brother); Hasdrubal the Fair (brother-in-law)
- Military career
- Allegiance: Carthage (221–202 BC); Seleucid Empire (192–190 BC); Kingdom of Bithynia (190–182 BC)
- Rank: General Commander-in-Chief of the Carthaginian army
- Wars: Barcid conquest of Hispania; Second Punic War; Roman–Seleucid war; Second Pergamene-Bithynian War; (see Battle record for a full list of battles commanded)
- Other work: Politician

Hannibal (/ˈhænɪbəl/; Punic: 𐤇𐤍𐤁𐤏𐤋; 247 – between 183 and 181 BC) was a Carthaginian general and statesman who commanded the forces of Carthage in their battle against the Roman Republic during the Second Punic War. Hannibal lived during a period of great tension in the Mediterranean Basin, triggered by the emergence of the Roman Republic as a great power with its defeat of Carthage in the First Punic War. Revanchism prevailed in Carthage, symbolized by the pledge that Hannibal made to his father to "never be a friend of Rome".

In 218 BC Hannibal attacked Saguntum (modern Sagunto, Spain), an ally of Rome in Hispania, and this attack sparked the Second Punic War. Hannibal invaded Italy by crossing the Alps with North African war elephants. In his first few years in Italy, as the leader of a Carthaginian and partially Celtic army, he won a succession of victories at the battles of Ticinus, Trebia, Lake Trasimene, and Cannae, inflicting heavy losses on the Romans. Hannibal was distinguished for his ability to determine both his and his opponent's respective strengths and weaknesses and to plan battles accordingly. His well-planned strategies allowed him to conquer and ally with several Italian cities that were previously allied to Rome. Hannibal occupied most of southern Italy for 15 years. The Romans, led by Fabius Maximus, avoided directly engaging him, instead waging a war of attrition (the Fabian strategy). Carthaginian defeats in Hispania prevented Hannibal from being reinforced, and he was unable to win a decisive victory. A counter-invasion of North Africa, led by the Roman general Scipio Africanus, forced him to return to Carthage. Hannibal was defeated at the Battle of Zama, ending the war in a Roman victory.

After the war, Hannibal successfully ran for the office of sufet. He enacted political and financial reforms to enable the payment of the war indemnity imposed by Rome. Those reforms were unpopular with members of the Carthaginian aristocracy and in Rome, and he fled into voluntary exile. During this time, he lived at the Seleucid court, where he acted as military advisor to Antiochus III the Great in his war against Rome. Antiochus met defeat at the Battle of Magnesia and was forced to accept Rome's terms, and Hannibal fled again, making a stop in the Kingdom of Armenia. His flight ended in the court of Bithynia. He was betrayed to the Romans and, poisoning himself, died by suicide.

Hannibal is considered one of the greatest military tacticians and generals of antiquity, alongside Alexander the Great, Julius Caesar, Scipio Africanus, and Pyrrhus. According to Plutarch, Scipio asked Hannibal "who the greatest general was", to which Hannibal replied "either Alexander or Pyrrhus, then myself".

== Name ==
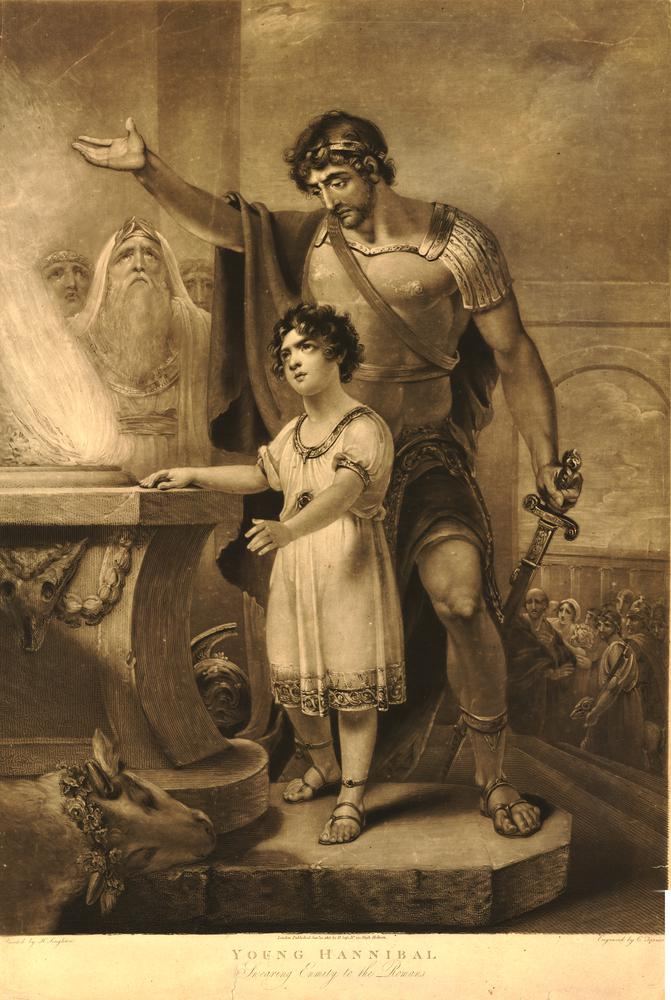
Circa 1850 engraving of Young Hannibal (left) by Charles Turner

Hannibal was a common Semitic Phoenician-Carthaginian personal name. It is recorded in Carthaginian sources as ḥnbʿl (Punic: 𐤇𐤍𐤁𐤏𐤋). It is a combination of the common Phoenician masculine given name Hanno with the Northwest Semitic Canaanite deity Baal Hammon (lit. 'lord') a major god of the Carthaginian's ancestral homeland of Phoenicia in Western Asia. Its precise vocalization remains a matter of debate. Suggested readings include Ḥannobaʿal, Ḥannibaʿl, or Ḥannibaʿal, meaning "Baʿal/The lord is gracious", "Baʿal Has Been Gracious", or "The Grace of Baʿal".

Greek historians rendered the name as Anníbas (Ἀννίβας). The Phoenicians and Carthaginians, like many West Asian Semitic peoples, did not use hereditary surnames but were typically distinguished from others bearing the same name using patronymics or epithets. Although he is by far the most famous Hannibal, when further clarification is necessary he is usually referred to as "Hannibal, son of Hamilcar"; "Hannibal the Barcid", to his father, Hamilcar Barca; or very frequently, "Hannibal Barca". Barca (Punic: 𐤁𐤓𐤒, brq) is a Semitic cognomen meaning "lightning" or "thunderbolt", a surname acquired by Hamilcar on account of the swiftness and ferocity of his attacks. Barca is cognate with similar names for lightning found among the Israelites, Assyrians, Babylonians, Arameans, Arabs, Amorites, Moabites, Edomites and other fellow Asiatic Semitic peoples.

Although they did not inherit the surname from their father, Hamilcar's progeny are collectively known as the Barcids. Modern historians occasionally refer to Hannibal's brothers as Hasdrubal Barca and Mago Barca to distinguish them from the multitudes of other Carthaginians named Hasdrubal and Mago, but this practice is ahistorical and is rarely applied to Hannibal.

== Background and early career ==
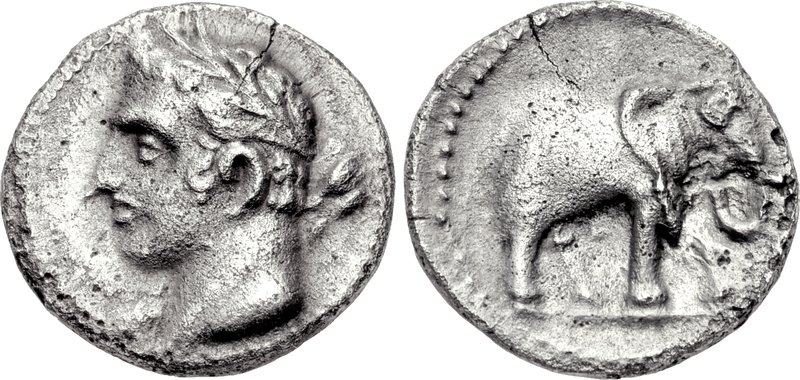
A quarter shekel of Carthage, perhaps minted in Spain. The obverse may depict Hannibal with the traits of a young Melqart (often associated with Herakles), although this is improbable. It is more likely that it simply depicts the god himself. The reverse features one of his famous war elephants.

Hannibal was one of the sons of Carthaginian general and statesman Hamilcar Barca and an unknown mother. He was most likely born in Carthage, one of many Mediterranean regions colonised by the Canaanites from their homeland in Phoenicia. He had several sisters whose names are unknown and two brothers, Hasdrubal and Mago. His brothers-in-law were Hasdrubal the Fair and the Numidian king Naravas. He was still a child when his sisters married, and his brothers-in-law were close associates during his father's struggles in the Mercenary War and the Punic conquest of the Iberian Peninsula.

After Carthage's defeat in the First Punic War, Hamilcar set out to improve his family's and Carthage's fortunes. With that in mind and supported by Gades, Hamilcar began the subjugation of the tribes of the Iberian Peninsula. Carthage was in such a poor state at the time that it lacked a navy able to transport his army; instead, Hamilcar had to march his forces across Numidia towards the Pillars of Hercules and then cross the Strait of Gibraltar.

According to Polybius, Hannibal much later said that when he came upon his father and begged to go with him, Hamilcar agreed and demanded that Hannibal swear that he would never be a friend of Rome as long as he lived. There is even an account of him at a very young age (9 years old) begging his father to take him to an overseas war. In the story, Hamilcar brought him to a sacrificial chamber. Hamilcar held Hannibal over the fire roaring in the chamber and made him swear that he would never be a friend of Rome. Other sources report that Hannibal told his father, "I swear so soon as age will permit...I will use fire and steel to arrest the destiny of Rome." According to the tradition, Hannibal's oath took place in Peñíscola.

Hannibal’s Spanish Campaigns, 221–220 BC

Hamilcar went about with the conquest of Hispania. When Hamilcar drowned in battle, Hasdrubal succeeded to his command of the army with Hannibal (then 18 years old) serving as an officer under him. Hasdrubal pursued a policy of consolidation of Carthage's Iberian interests, even signing a treaty with Rome whereby Carthage would not expand north of the Ebro so long as Rome did not expand south of it. Hasdrubal also endeavoured to consolidate Carthaginian power through diplomatic relationships with the Iberians and the Berbers of the North African coasts.

Upon the assassination of Hasdrubal in 221 BC, Hannibal at 26 years old was proclaimed commander-in-chief by the army and confirmed in his appointment by the Carthaginian government. Roman scholar Livy gives a depiction of the young Carthaginian: "No sooner had he arrived...the old soldiers fancied they saw Hamilcar in his youth given back to them; the same bright look; the same fire in his eye, the same trick of countenance and features. Never was one and the same spirit more skilful to meet opposition, to obey, or to command[.]"

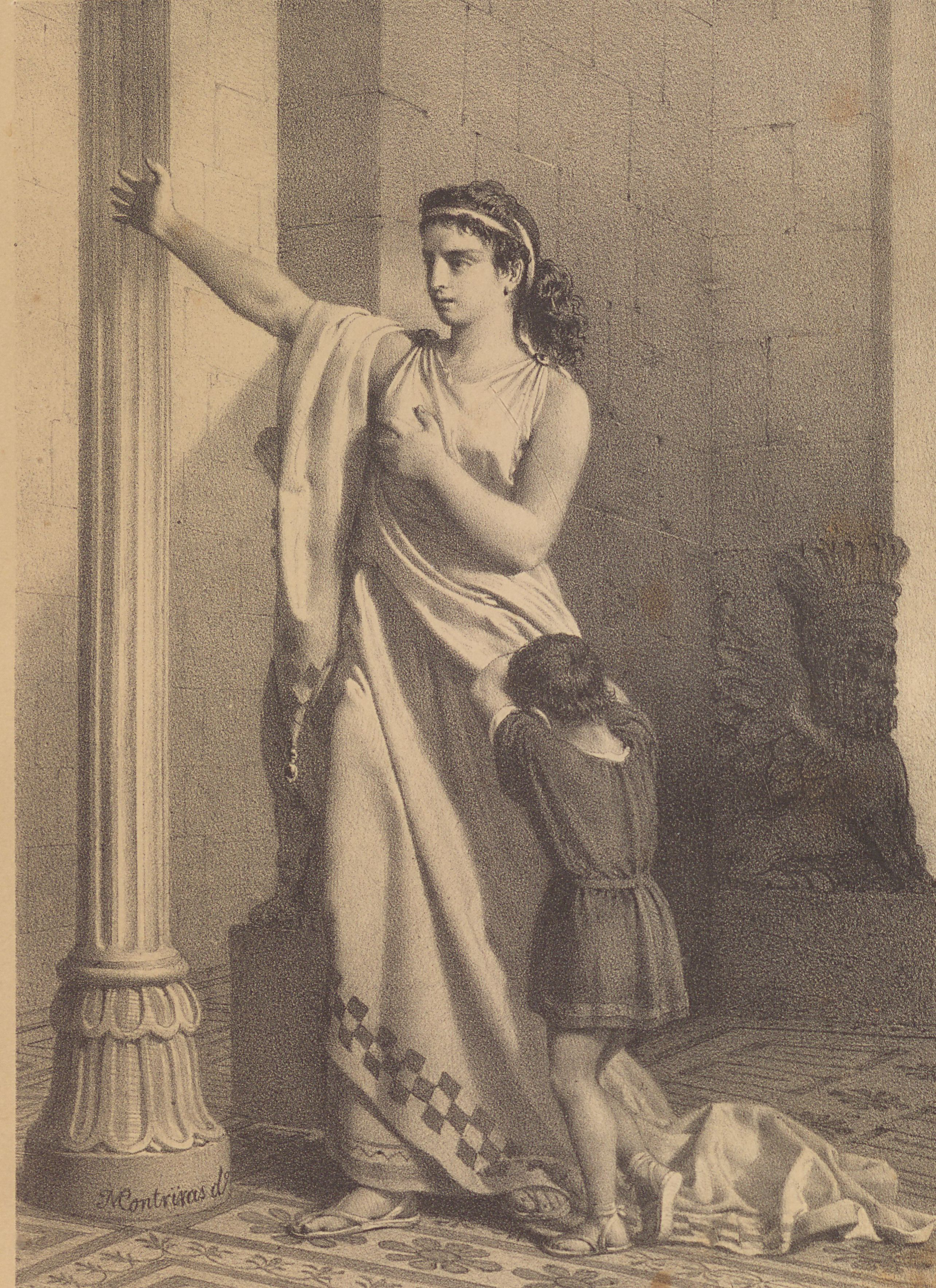
An 1868 illustration of Imilce and her son Haspar by Juan de Dios de la Rada

Livy records that Hannibal married a woman from Castulo, a powerful Spanish city closely allied with Carthage. Roman poet Silius Italicus names her as Imilce. Silius suggests a Greek origin for Imilce, but historian Gilbert Charles-Picard argues for a Punic heritage based on an etymology from the Semitic root m-l-k ('chief, the 'king'). Silius also suggests the existence of a son, who is otherwise not attested by Livy, Polybius, or Appian. The son may have been named Haspar or Aspar, although this is disputed.

After he assumed command, Hannibal spent two years consolidating his holdings and completing the conquest of Hispania, south of the Ebro. In his first campaign, Hannibal stormed the Olcades' strongest centre, Alithia, which promptly led to their surrender, and brought Punic power close to the River Tagus. His following campaign in 220 BC was against the Vaccaei to the west, where he stormed the Vaccaen strongholds of Helmantice and Arbucala. On his return home, laden with many spoils, a coalition of Spanish tribes led by the Carpetani attacked, and Hannibal won his first major battlefield success and showed off his tactical skills at the battle of the River Tagus.

Fearing the growing strength of Hannibal in Iberia, Rome made an alliance with Saguntum, which lay a considerable distance south of the River Ebro, and claimed the city as its protectorate. Hannibal perceived this as a breach of the treaty signed with Hasdrubal, and since he was already planning an attack on Rome, this was his way to start the war. So he laid siege to the city, which fell after eight months.

Hannibal sent the booty from Saguntum to Carthage, a shrewd move which gained him much support from the government; Livy records that only Hanno II the Great spoke against him. In Rome, the Senate reacted to this apparent violation of the treaty by dispatching a delegation to Carthage to demand whether Hannibal had destroyed Saguntum in accordance with orders from Carthage. The Carthaginian Senate responded with legal arguments observing the lack of ratification by either government for the treaty alleged to have been violated. The delegation's leader, Quintus Fabius Maximus Verrucosus, demanded Carthage choose between war and peace, to which his audience replied that Rome could choose. Fabius chose war.

== Second Punic War in Italy (218–204 BC) ==
=== Overland journey to Italy ===
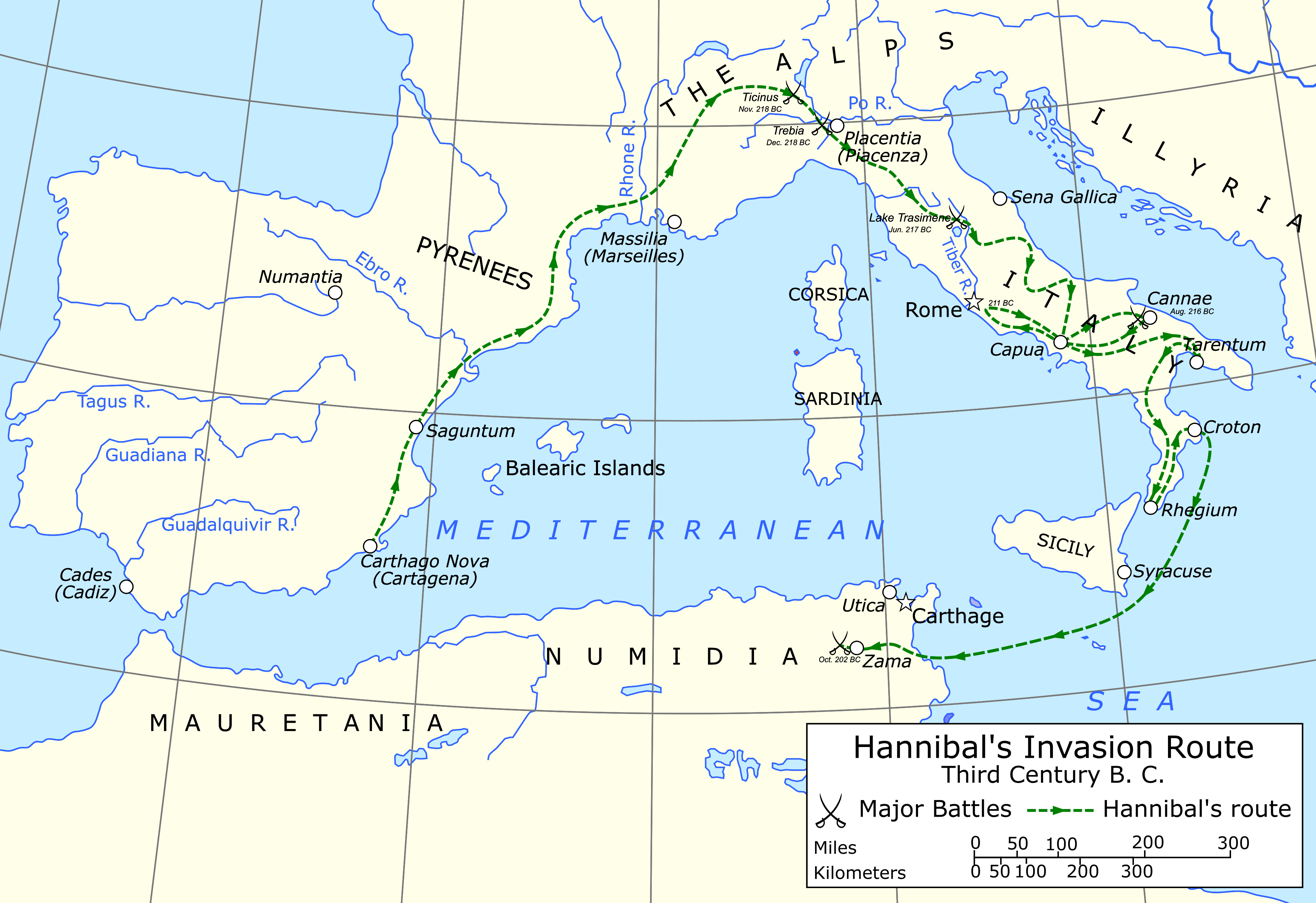
Hannibal's route from Iberia to Italy

A campaign to Italy was originally planned by Hasdrubal, who was stationed in the Iberian Peninsula for eight years until 221 BC. Soon, the Romans became aware of an alliance between Carthage and the Celts of the Po Valley in northern Italy. When Hannibal arrived in the Po Valley, roughly 10,000 Celtic tribesmen joined his army. The Celts were amassing forces to invade farther south in Italy, presumably with Carthaginian backing. Therefore, the Romans pre-emptively invaded the Po region in 225 BC. By 220 BC the Romans had annexed the area as Cisalpine Gaul. Hasdrubal was assassinated around the same time (221 BC), bringing Hannibal to the fore.

Hannibal departed Cartagena, Spain (New Carthage) in late spring of 218 BC. He fought his way through the northern tribes to the foothills of the Pyrenees, subduing the tribes through clever mountain tactics and stubborn fighting. He left a detachment of 20,000 troops to garrison the conquered region. At the Pyrenees, he released 11,000 Iberian troops who showed reluctance to leave their homeland. Hannibal reportedly entered Gaul with 40,000 foot soldiers and 12,000 horsemen.

Hannibal recognized that he still needed to cross the Pyrenees, the Alps, and many large rivers. Additionally, he would have to contend with opposition from the Gauls, whose territory he passed through. Starting in the spring of 218 BC, he crossed the Pyrenees, and by conciliating the Gaulish chiefs along his passage before the Romans could take any measures to bar his advance, he was able to reach the Rhône by September. Hannibal's army numbered 38,000 infantry, 8,000 cavalry, and 38 elephants, almost none of which would survive the harsh conditions of the Alps.

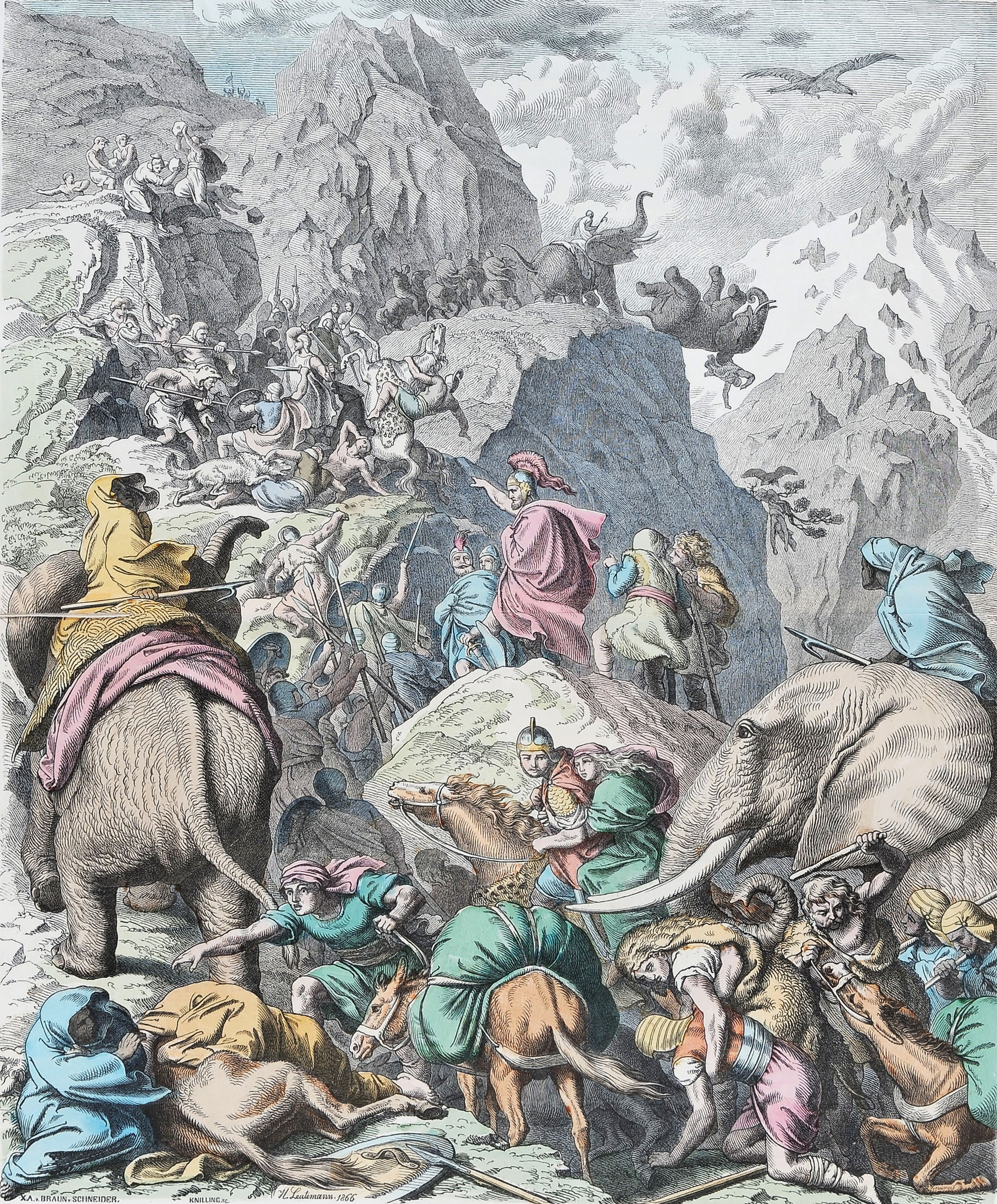
An 1866 illustration of Hannibal and his army crossing the Alps, by Heinrich Leutemann

Hannibal outmanoeuvred the natives who had tried to prevent his crossing, then evaded a Roman force marching from the Mediterranean coast by turning inland up the valley of the Rhône. His exact route over the Alps has been the source of scholarly dispute ever since (Polybius, the surviving ancient account closest in time to Hannibal's campaign, reports that the route was already debated). The most influential modern theories favour either a march up the valley of the Drôme and a crossing of the main range to the south of the modern highway over the Col de Montgenèvre or a march farther north up the valleys of the Isère and Arc crossing the main range near the present Col de Mont Cenis or the Little St Bernard Pass. Recent numismatic evidence suggests that Hannibal's army passed within sight of the Matterhorn. Stanford geoarchaeologist Patrick Hunt argues that Hannibal took the Col de Clapier mountain pass, claiming the Clapier most accurately meets ancient depictions of the route: wide view of Italy, pockets of year-round snow, and a large campground. Other scholars have doubts, proposing that Hannibal took the easier route across Petit Mount Cenis. Hunt responds to this by proposing that Hannibal's Celtic guides purposefully misguided the Carthaginian general.

Most recently, W. C. Mahaney has argued Col de la Traversette closest fits the records of ancient authors. Biostratigraphic archaeological data has reinforced the case for Col de la Traversette; analysis of peat bogs near watercourses on both sides of the pass's summit showed that the ground was heavily disturbed "by thousands, perhaps tens of thousands, of animals and humans" and that the soil bore traces of unique levels of Clostridia bacteria associated with the digestive tracts of horses and mules. Radiocarbon dating secured dates of 2168 BP or c. 218 BC, the year of Hannibal's march. Mahaney et al. conclude that this and other evidence strongly supports the Col de la Traversette as being the "Hannibalic Route" as had been argued by Gavin de Beer in 1954. De Beer was one of only three interpreters—the others being John Lazenby and Jakob Seibert—to have visited all the Alpine high passes and presented a view on which was most plausible. Both De Beer and Seibert had selected the Col de la Traversette as the one most closely matching the ancient descriptions.

Polybius writes that Hannibal had crossed the highest of the Alpine passes: Col de la Traversette, between the upper Guil valley and the upper Po river, is the highest pass. It is moreover the most southerly, as Roman general Varro in his De re rustica relates, agreeing that Hannibal's passage was the highest in the western Alps and the most southerly. Mahaney et al. argue that factors used by De Beer to support Col de la Traversette including "gauging ancient place names against modern, close scrutiny of times of flood in major rivers and distant viewing of the Po plains" taken together with "massive radiocarbon and microbiological and parasitical evidence" from the alluvial sediments on either side of the pass furnish "supporting evidence, proof if you will" that Hannibal's invasion went that way. If Hannibal had ascended the Col de la Traversette, the Po Valley would have been visible from the pass's summit, vindicating Polybius's account.

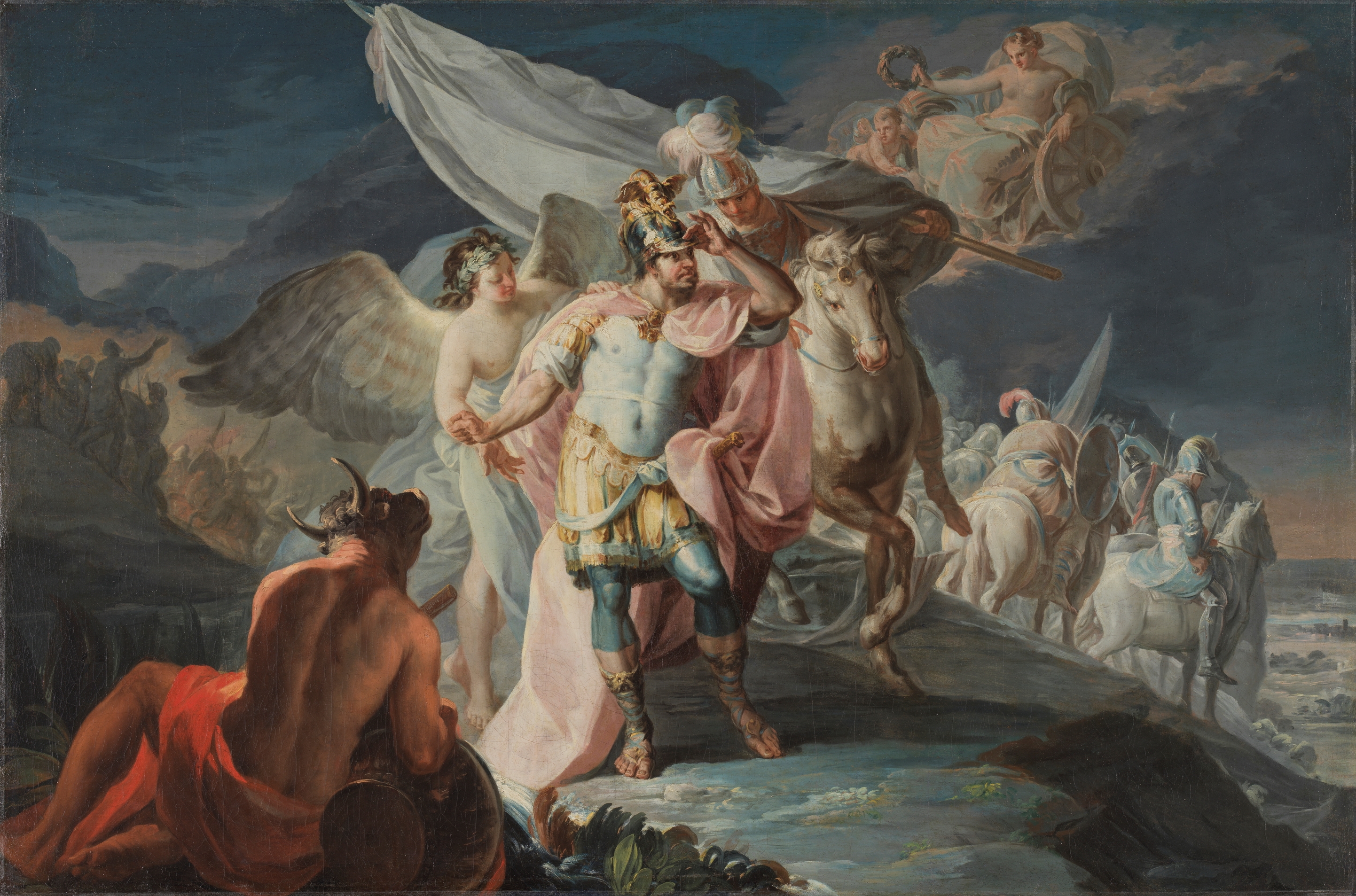
The Victorious Hannibal Seeing Italy from the Alps for the First Time by Francisco Goya (1771).

By Livy's account, the crossing was accomplished in the face of huge difficulties. These Hannibal surmounted with ingenuity, such as when he used vinegar and fire to break through a rockfall. According to Polybius, he arrived in Italy accompanied by 20,000 foot soldiers, 6,000 horsemen, and only a few elephants. The fired rockfall event is mentioned only by Livy; Polybius is mute on the subject and there is no evidence of carbonized rock at the only two-tier rockfall in the western Alps, located below the Col de la Traversette (Mahaney, 2008). If Polybius is correct in his figure for the number of troops that he commanded after the crossing of the Rhône, this would suggest that he had lost almost half of his force. Historians such as Serge Lancel have questioned the reliability of the figures for the number of troops that he had when he left Hispania. From the start, he seems to have calculated that he would have to operate without aid from Hispania.

Hannibal's vision of military affairs was derived partly from the teaching of his Greek tutors and partly from experience gained alongside his father, and it stretched over most of the Hellenistic world of his time. The breadth of his vision gave rise to his grand strategy of conquering Rome by opening a northern front and subduing allied city-states on the peninsula, rather than by attacking Rome directly. Historical events that led to the defeat of Carthage during the First Punic War when his father commanded the Carthaginian Army also led Hannibal to plan the invasion of Italy by land across the Alps. The task involved the mobilization of between 60,000 and 100,000 troops and the training of a war elephant corps, all of which had to be provisioned along the way.

=== Battle of Trebia ===
A diagram depicting the tactics used in the Battle of the Trebia

Hannibal's perilous march brought him into the Roman territory and frustrated the attempts of the enemy to fight out the main issue on foreign ground. His sudden appearance among the Gauls of the Po Valley enabled him to detach those tribes from their allegiance to the Romans before the Romans could take steps to check the rebellion. Consul Publius Cornelius Scipio, the father of Scipio Africanus, assumed responsibility for dealing with Hannibal.

Scipio had not expected Hannibal to make an attempt to cross the Alps and had already sent most of his forces abroad to fight the war in the Iberian Peninsula. With only a small detachment still positioned in Gaul, Scipio nevertheless attempted to confront Hannibal. He succeeded, through prompt decision and speedy movement, in transporting his army to Italy by sea in time to meet Hannibal. Hannibal's forces moved through the Po Valley and were engaged in the Battle of Ticinus in November 218 BC. Here, Hannibal forced the Romans to evacuate the plain of Lombardy, by virtue of his superior cavalry. The victory was minor, but it encouraged the Gauls and Ligurians to join the Carthaginian cause. Their troops bolstered his army back to around 40,000 men. Scipio was severely injured, his life only saved by the bravery of his son who rode back onto the field to rescue his fallen father. Scipio retreated across the Trebbia to camp at Placentia with his army mostly intact.

Even before news of the defeat at Ticinus had reached Rome, the Senate had ordered Consul Tiberius Sempronius Longus to bring his army back from Sicily to meet Scipio and face Hannibal. Hannibal, by skillful maneuvers, was in position to head him off, for he lay on the direct road between Placentia and Arminum, by which Sempronius would have to march to reinforce Scipio. Hannibal captured Clastidium, from which he drew large amounts of supplies for his men. But this gain was not without loss, as Sempronius avoided Hannibal's watchfulness, slipped around his flank, and joined his colleague near the Trebbia near Placentia. There, Hannibal had an opportunity to show his masterful military skill at the Trebia in December, wearing down the superior Roman infantry before cutting it to pieces with a surprise attack and ambush from the flanks. However, most or all of his war elephants had died of injuries or the cold that winter, and none took part in the succeeding battles.

=== Battle of Lake Trasimene ===
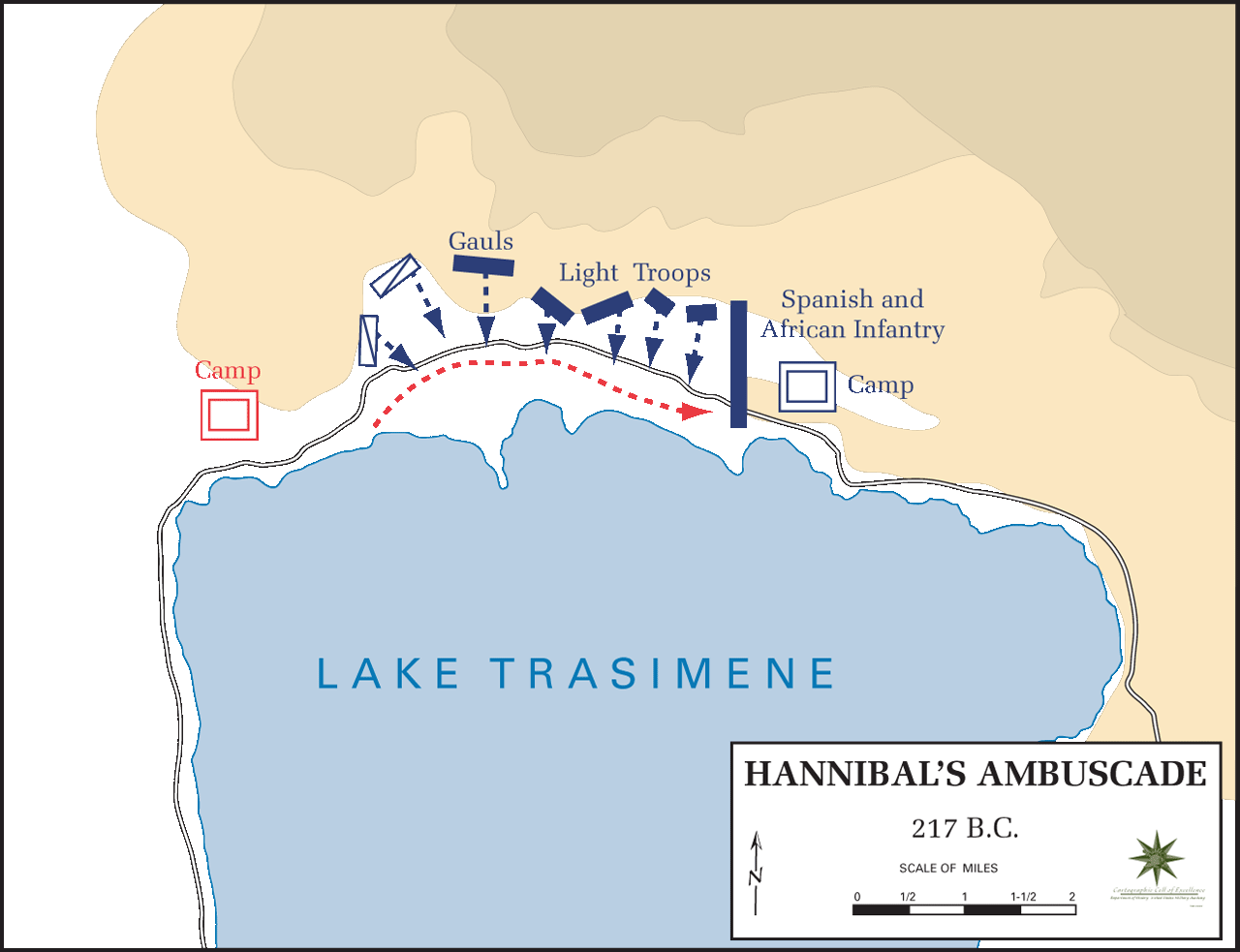
The Battle of Lake Trasimene, 217 BC. From the Department of History, United States Military Academy

Hannibal quartered his troops for the winter with the Gauls, whose support for him had abated. Fearing the possibility that the tribesmen would seek to assassinate him and win back the Romans' favor, Hannibal resorted to altering his appearance by wearing differently dyed wigs in the hopes they would not recognize him. In the spring of 217 BC Hannibal decided to find a more reliable base of operations farther south. Gnaeus Servilius and Gaius Flaminius (the new consuls of Rome) were expecting Hannibal to advance on Rome, and they took their armies to block the eastern and western routes that Hannibal could use.

The only alternative route to central Italy lay at the mouth of the Arno. This area was mostly marshland and happened to be overflowing more than usual that spring. Hannibal knew that this route was full of difficulties, but it remained the surest and quickest way to central Italy. Polybius claims that Hannibal's men marched for four days and three nights "through a land that was under water", suffering terribly from fatigue and enforced want of sleep. He crossed without opposition over both the Apennines (during which he lost his right eye because of conjunctivitis) and the seemingly impassable Arno, but he lost a large part of his force in the marshy lowlands of the Arno. He arrived in Etruria in the spring of 217 BC and decided to lure the main Roman army under Flaminius into a pitched battle by devastating the region that Flaminius had been sent to protect. As Polybius recounts, "he [Hannibal] calculated that, if he passed the camp and made a descent into the district beyond, Flaminius (partly for fear of popular reproach and partly of personal irritation) would be unable to endure watching passively the devastation of the country but would spontaneously follow him... and give him opportunities for attack."

At the same time, Hannibal tried to break the allegiance of Rome's allies by proving that Flaminius was powerless to protect them. Despite this, Flaminius remained passively encamped at Arretium. Hannibal marched boldly around Flaminius' left flank, unable to draw him into battle by mere devastation, and effectively cut him off from Rome, executing the first recorded turning movement in military history. He then advanced through the uplands of Etruria, provoking Flaminius into a hasty pursuit and catching him in a defile on the shore of Lake Trasimenus. There Hannibal destroyed Flaminius' army in the waters or on the adjoining slopes, killing Flaminius as well. This was the most costly ambush that the Romans ever sustained until the Battle of Carrhae in 53 BC. Hannibal had disposed of the only field force that could check his advance upon Rome. He realized that without siege engines, he could not hope to take the capital. He opted to exploit his victory by entering into central and southern Italy and encouraging a general revolt against the sovereign power.

The Romans appointed Quintus Fabius Maximus Verrucosus as their dictator. Departing from Roman military traditions, Fabius adopted the strategy named after him, avoiding open battle while placing several Roman armies in Hannibal's vicinity in order to watch and limit his movements. Hannibal ravaged Apulia but was unable to bring Fabius to battle, so he decided to march through Samnium to Campania, one of the richest and most fertile provinces of Italy, hoping that the devastation would draw Fabius into battle. Fabius closely followed Hannibal's path of destruction yet still refused to let himself be drawn out of the defensive. This strategy was unpopular with many Romans, who believed that it was a form of cowardice.

Hannibal decided that it would be unwise to winter in the devastated lowlands of Campania, but Fabius had trapped him there by ensuring that all the exit passes were blocked. This situation led to the night Battle of Ager Falernus. Hannibal had his men tie burning torches to the horns of a herd of cattle and drive them up the heights nearby. Some of the Romans, seeing a moving column of lights, were tricked into believing it was the Carthaginian army marching to escape along the heights. As they moved off in pursuit of this decoy, Hannibal managed to move his army in silence through the dark lowlands and up to an unguarded pass. Fabius was within striking distance, but in this case his caution worked against him, as rightly sensing a trick he stayed put. Thus, Hannibal managed to stealthily escape with his entire army intact. What Hannibal achieved in extricating his army was, as historian Adrian Goldsworthy puts it, "a classic of ancient generalship, finding its way into nearly every historical narrative of the war and being used by later military manuals". This was a severe blow to Fabius' prestige, and when his dictatorial term ended soon after, it was not renewed. For the winter, Hannibal found comfortable quarters in the Apulian plain.

=== Battle of Cannae ===
The destruction of the Roman army (red) at Cannae, courtesy of the Department of History, United States Military Academy

In the spring of 216 BC Hannibal took the initiative and seized the large supply depot at Cannae in the Apulian plain. By capturing Cannae, Hannibal had placed himself between the Romans and their crucial sources of supply. Once the Roman Senate resumed their consular elections in 216 BC, they appointed Gaius Terentius Varro and Lucius Aemilius Paullus as consuls. In the meantime, the Romans hoped to gain success through sheer strength and weight of numbers, and they raised an army of unprecedented size, estimated by some to be as large as 100,000 men but more likely around 50,000–80,000.

The Romans and allied legions resolved to confront Hannibal and marched southward to Apulia. They eventually found him on the left bank of the Aufidus River and encamped 10 km (6 mi) away. On this occasion, the two armies were combined into one, the consuls having to alternate their command on a daily basis. According to Livy, Varro was a man of reckless and hubristic nature, and it was his turn to command on the day of battle. This account is possibly biased against Varro as its main source, Polybius, was a client of Paullus's aristocratic family whereas Varro was less distinguished. Some historians have suggested that the sheer size of the army required both generals to command a wing each. This theory is supported by the fact that after Varro survived the battle he was pardoned by the Senate, which would be peculiar if he were the sole commander at fault.

Hannibal capitalized on the eagerness of the Romans and drew them into a trap by using an envelopment tactic. This eliminated the Roman numerical advantage by shrinking the combat area. Hannibal drew up his least reliable infantry in the centre in a semicircle curving towards the Romans. Placing them forward of the wings allowed them room to fall back, luring the Romans after them, while the cavalry on the flanks dealt with their Roman counterparts. Hannibal's wings were composed of the Gallic and Numidian cavalry. The Roman legions forced their way through Hannibal's weak centre, but the Libyan mercenaries on the wings—swung around by the movement—menaced their flanks.

The onslaught of Hannibal's cavalry was unstoppable. Hannibal's chief cavalry commander Maharbal led the mobile Numidian cavalry on the right which shattered the Roman cavalry opposing them. Hannibal's Iberian and Gallic heavy cavalry on the left, led by Hanno, defeated the Roman heavy cavalry after which both the Carthaginian heavy cavalry and the Numidians attacked the legions from behind. As a result, the Roman army was fully surrounded with no means of escape.

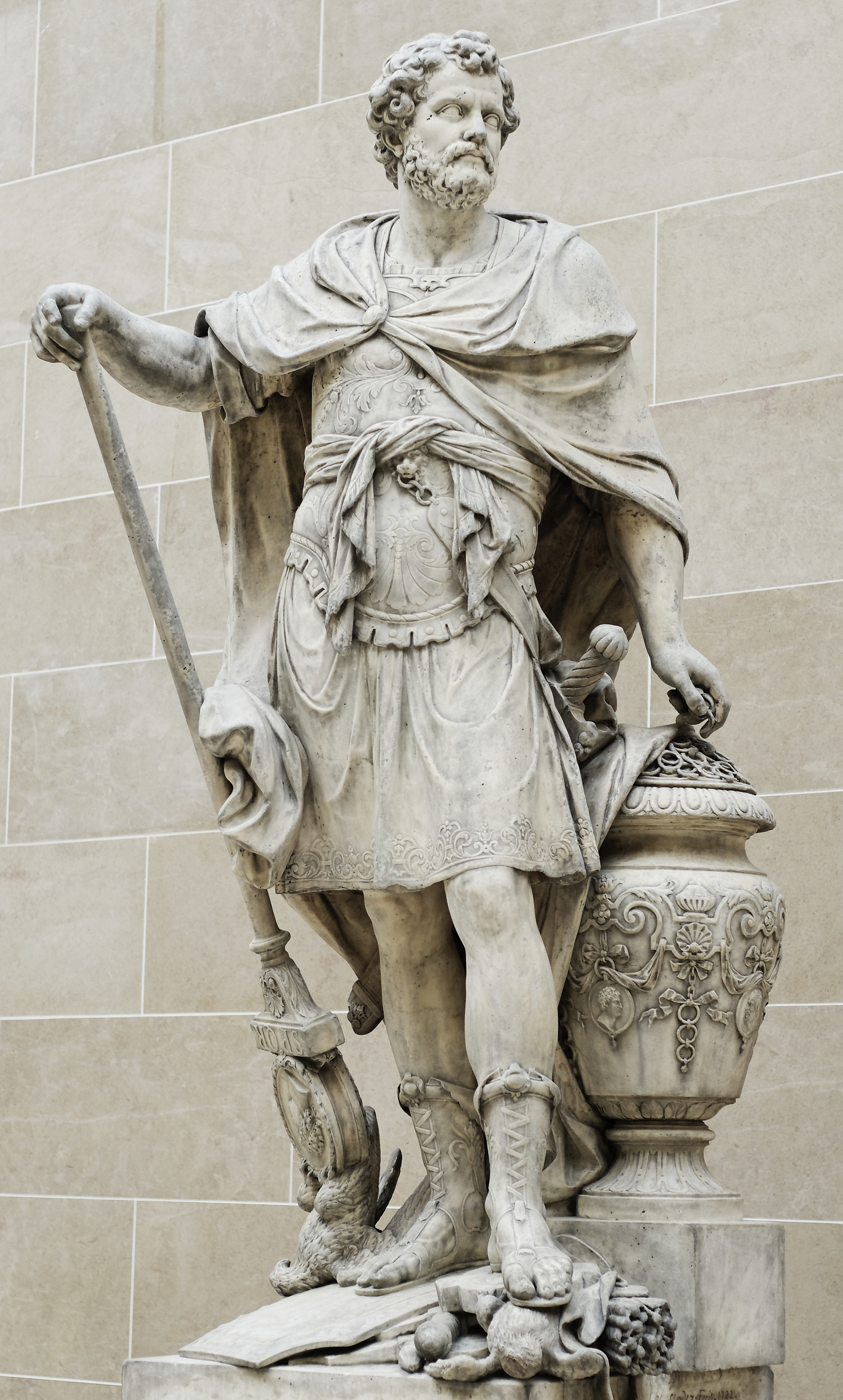
1704 statue of Hannibal counting the rings of the equites killed at Cannae

With these brilliant tactics Hannibal managed to surround and destroy all but a small remnant of his enemy, despite his inferior numbers. Depending upon the source, it is estimated that 50,000–70,000 Romans were killed or captured. Among the dead were Roman Consul Lucius Aemilius Paullus, two consuls for the preceding year, two quaestors, 29 of the 48 military tribunes, and an additional 80 senators. At a time when the Roman Senate was composed of no more than 300 men, this constituted 25–30% of the governing body. This makes the battle one of the most catastrophic defeats in the history of ancient Rome and one of the bloodiest battles in all of human history, in terms of the number of lives lost in a single day.

After Cannae, the Romans were very hesitant to confront Hannibal in pitched battle, preferring instead to weaken him by attrition, relying on their advantages of interior lines, supply, and manpower. As a result, Hannibal fought no more major battles in Italy for the rest of the war. It is believed that his refusal to bring the war to Rome was a lack of commitment from Carthage of men, money, and material—principally siege equipment. Whatever the reason, the choice prompted Maharbal to say, "Hannibal, you know how to gain a victory, but not how to use one."

As a result of this victory, many parts of Italy joined Hannibal's cause. As Polybius notes, "How much more serious was the defeat of Cannae, than those that preceded it can be seen by the behaviour of Rome's allies; before that fateful day, their loyalty remained unshaken, now it began to waver for the simple reason that they despaired of Roman Power." During 216 BC the Greek cities in Sicily were induced to revolt against Roman political control, while King Philip V of Macedon pledged his support to Hannibal, initiating the First Macedonian War against Rome.

Hannibal also secured an alliance with newly appointed tyrant Hieronymus of Syracuse. It is often argued that if Hannibal had received proper material reinforcements from Carthage, he might have succeeded with a direct attack upon Rome. Instead, he had to content himself with subduing the fortresses that still held out against him, and the only other notable event of 216 BC was the defection of certain Italian territories, including Capua, the second largest city of Italy, which Hannibal made his base. However, only a few of the Italian city-states that he had expected to gain as allies defected to him.

=== Stalemate ===
The war in Italy settled into a strategic stalemate. The Romans used the attritional strategy that Fabius had taught them, which they finally realized was the only feasible means of defeating Hannibal. Fabius received the name "Cunctator" ("the Delayer") because of his policy of not meeting Hannibal in open battle. The Romans deprived Hannibal of a large-scale battle and instead assaulted his weakening army with multiple smaller armies in an attempt to both weary him and create unrest in his troops. For the next few years, Hannibal was forced to sustain a scorched earth policy and obtain local provisions for protracted and ineffectual operations throughout southern Italy. His immediate objectives were reduced to minor operations centred mainly around the cities of Campania.

The forces detached to his lieutenants were generally unable to hold their own, and neither his home government nor Philip V helped to make up his losses. His position in southern Italy therefore became increasingly difficult, and his chance of ultimately conquering Rome grew ever more remote. Hannibal still won a number of notable victories: completely destroying two Roman armies in 212 BC, and slaying two consuls including the famed Marcus Claudius Marcellus in a battle in 208 BC. However, Hannibal slowly began losing ground—inadequately supported by his Italian allies, abandoned by his government (either because of jealousy or simply because Carthage was overstretched), and unable to match Rome's resources. He was not able to bring about another grand decisive victory that could produce a lasting strategic change.

Carthaginian political will was embodied in the ruling oligarchy. There was a Carthaginian Senate, but the real power was with the inner "Council of 30 Nobles" and the board of judges from ruling families known as the "Hundred and Four". Two political factions operated in Carthage: the war party, also known as the "Barcids" (Hannibal's family name), and the peace party led by Hanno II the Great. Hanno had been instrumental in denying Hannibal's requested reinforcements following the Battle of Cannae. He and his allies relied on trade with Rome to sustain their wealth and resented how Hannibal's unauthorized attack of Saguntum had forced them to choose between losing prestige or committing Carthage to war. Thus, they repeatedly acted to thwart Hannibal's plans; requests for supplies and equipment that would have made besieging Rome and its fortified cities possible were either delayed or ignored, and Carthaginian soldiers in northern Africa were not sent to reinforce Hannibal, forcing him to increasingly rely on local mercenaries who refused to be disciplined and whose loyalty lasted only until there was no plunder for them to earn.

=== Retreat ===
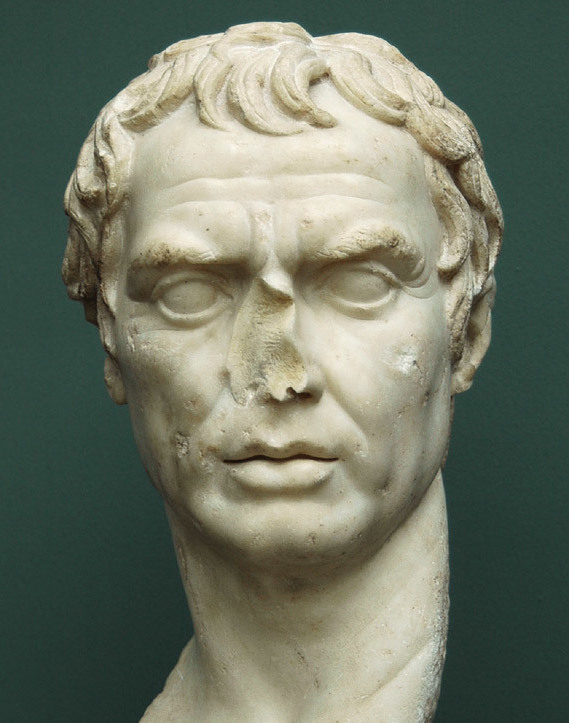
A bust of doubtful provenance, possibly of Scipio Africanus, and originally from the Tomb of the Scipios

In March 212 BC Hannibal captured Tarentum in a surprise attack, but he failed to obtain control of its harbor. The tide was slowly turning against him and in favor of Rome. The Roman consuls mounted a siege of Capua in 212 BC. Hannibal attacked them, forcing their withdrawal from Campania. He moved to Lucania and destroyed a 16,000-man Roman army at the Battle of the Silarus, with 15,000 Romans killed. Another opportunity presented itself soon after, a Roman army of 18,000 men being destroyed by Hannibal at the first battle of Herdonia with 16,000 Romans dead, freeing Apulia from the Romans for the year.

The Roman consuls mounted another siege of Capua in 211 BC, conquering the city. Hannibal's attempt to lift the siege with an assault on the Roman siege lines failed. He marched on Rome to force the recall of the Roman armies. He drew off 15,000 Roman soldiers, but the siege continued, and Capua fell. In 212 BC Marcellus conquered Syracuse, and the Romans destroyed the Carthaginian army in Sicily in 211–210 BC. In 210 BC, the Romans entered into an alliance with the Aetolian League to counter Philip V. Philip, who attempted to exploit Rome's preoccupation in Italy to conquer Illyria, found himself under attack from several sides at once and was quickly subdued by Rome and her Greek allies.

In 210 BC Hannibal again proved his superiority in tactics by inflicting a severe defeat at the Battle of Herdonia in Apulia upon a proconsular army and, in 208 BC he destroyed a Roman force engaged in the siege of Locri at the Battle of Petelia. But with the loss of Tarentum in 209 BC and the gradual reconquest by the Romans of Samnium and Lucania, his hold on south Italy was almost lost. In 207 BC he succeeded in making his way again into Apulia, where he waited to concert measures for a combined march upon Rome with his brother Hasdrubal. On hearing of Hasdrubal's defeat and death at the Battle of the Metaurus he retired to Calabria, where he maintained himself for the ensuing years. Hasdrubal's head had been cut off, carried across Italy, and tossed over the palisade of Hannibal's camp as a cold message of the iron-clad will of the Roman Republic. The combination of these events marked the end to Hannibal's success in Italy. With the failure of his brother Mago in Liguria (205–203 BC) and of his own negotiations with Phillip, the last hope of recovering his ascendancy in Italy was lost.

== Conclusion of the Second Punic War (203–201 BC) ==
=== Return to Carthage ===
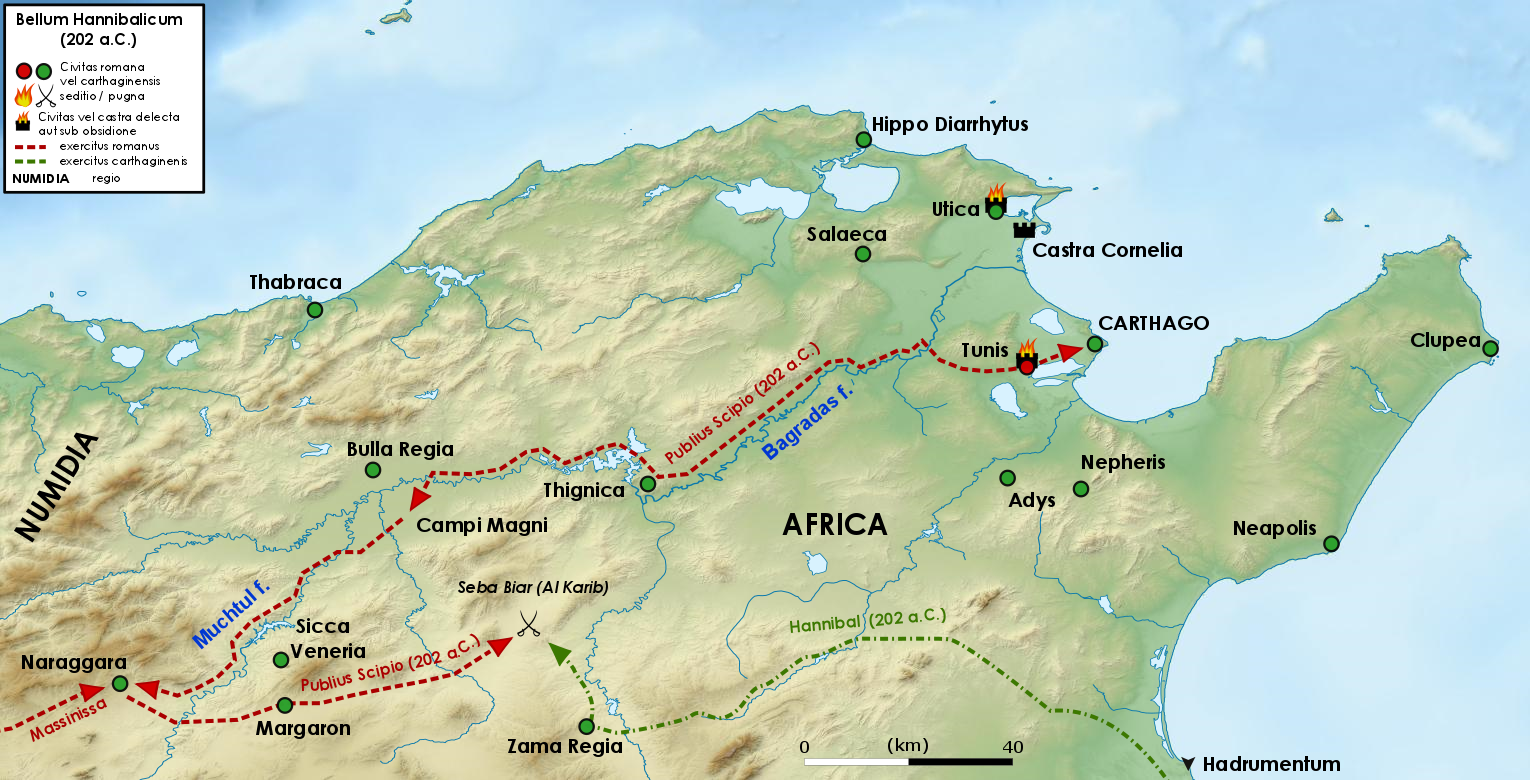
The final act of the Second Punic War, the battle of Zama (202 BC)

In 203 BC, after nearly 15 years of fighting in Italy and with the military fortunes of Carthage rapidly declining, Hannibal was recalled to Carthage to direct the defense of his native country against a Roman invasion under Scipio Africanus. After leaving a record of his expedition engraved in Punic and Greek upon bronze tablets in the Temple of Juno Lacinia at Crotona, he sailed back to Africa. His arrival immediately restored the predominance of the war party, which placed him in command of a combined force of African levies and his mercenaries from Italy. In 202 BC Hannibal met Scipio in a fruitless peace conference.

Despite mutual admiration, negotiations floundered due to Roman allegations of "Punic Faith," referring to the breach of protocols that ended the First Punic War by the Carthaginian attack on Saguntum and an attack on a stranded Roman fleet. Scipio and Carthage had worked out a peace plan, which was approved by Rome. The terms of the treaty were quite modest, but the war had been long for the Romans. Carthage could keep its African territory but would lose its overseas empire. Numidia was to be independent. Also, Carthage was to reduce its fleet and pay a war indemnity. Carthage then made a terrible blunder. Its long-suffering citizens had captured a stranded Roman fleet in the Gulf of Tunis and stripped it of supplies, an action that aggravated the faltering negotiations. Fortified by both Hannibal and the supplies, the Carthaginians rebuffed the treaty and Roman protests.

=== Battle of Zama (202 BC) ===
Unlike most battles of the Second Punic War, at Zama the Romans were superior in cavalry and the Carthaginians had the edge in infantry. This Roman cavalry superiority was due to the betrayal of King Masinissa of Numidia, who had earlier assisted Carthage in Iberia but changed sides in 206 BC with the promise of land, and due to his personal conflicts with Syphax, a Carthaginian ally. Although the ageing Hannibal was suffering from mental exhaustion and deteriorating health after years of campaigning in Italy, the Carthaginians still had the advantage in numbers and were boosted by 80 war elephants.

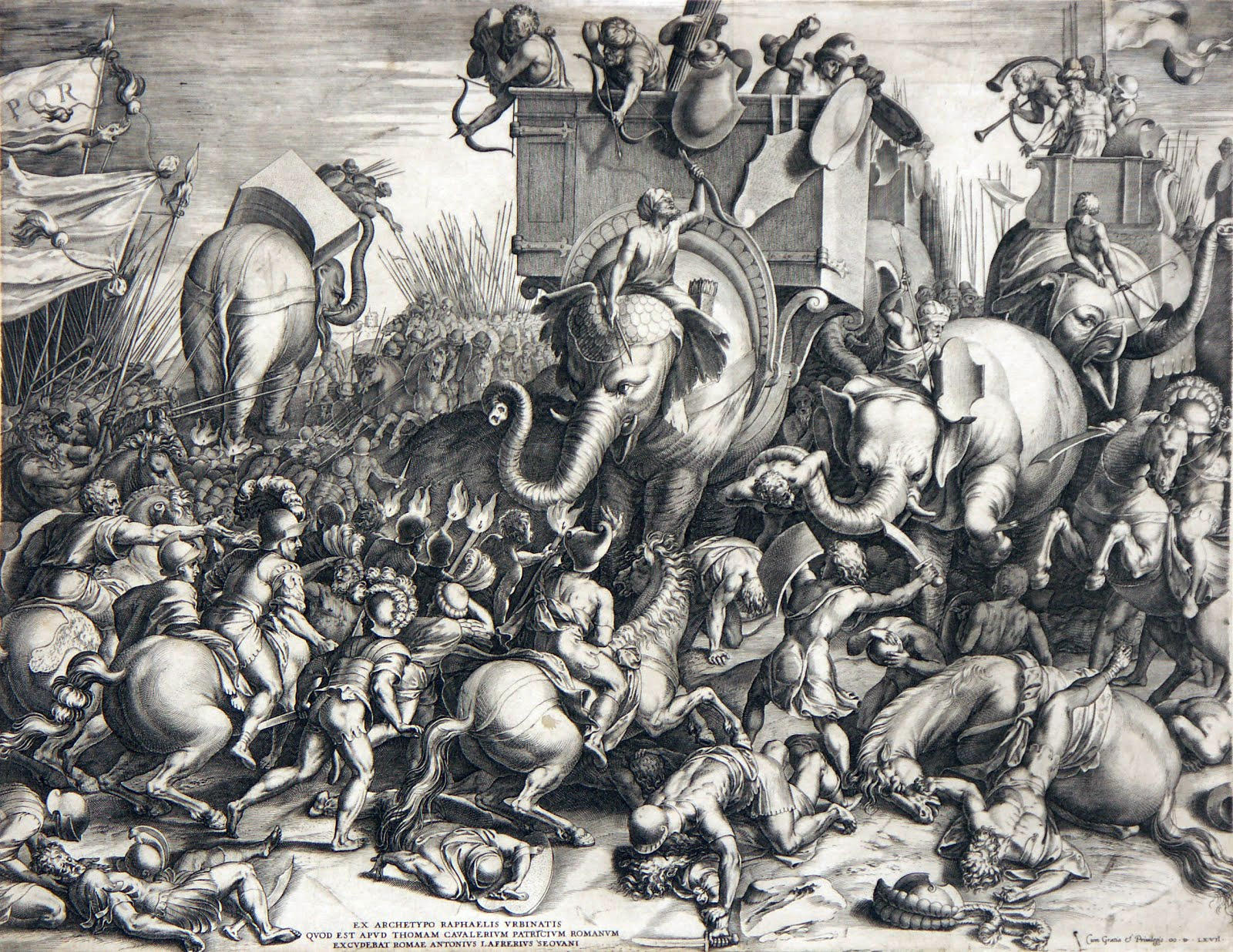
Engraving of the Battle of Zama by Cornelis Cort, 1567. Note that Asian elephants are illustrated rather than the very small North African elephants used by Carthage.

The Roman cavalry won an early victory by swiftly routing the Carthaginian cavalry. The Romans were also successful in limiting the effectiveness of the war elephants with tactics such as playing trumpets to frighten the elephants and cause them to run into the Carthaginian lines. Some historians say that the elephants routed the Carthaginian cavalry and not the Romans, whilst others suggest that it was actually a tactical retreat planned by Hannibal. Whatever the truth, the battle remained closely fought. At one point, it seemed that Hannibal was on the verge of victory, but Scipio was able to rally his men. Scipio's cavalry attacked Hannibal's rear. This two-pronged attack caused the Carthaginian formation to collapse.

With their foremost general defeated, the Carthaginians had no choice but to surrender. Carthage lost approximately 20,000 troops with an additional 15,000 wounded. The Romans suffered 2,500 casualties. The last major battle of the Second Punic War resulted in a loss of respect for Hannibal by his fellow Carthaginians. The conditions of defeat were such that Carthage could no longer battle for Mediterranean supremacy.

== Later career ==
=== Peacetime Carthage (200–196 BC) ===
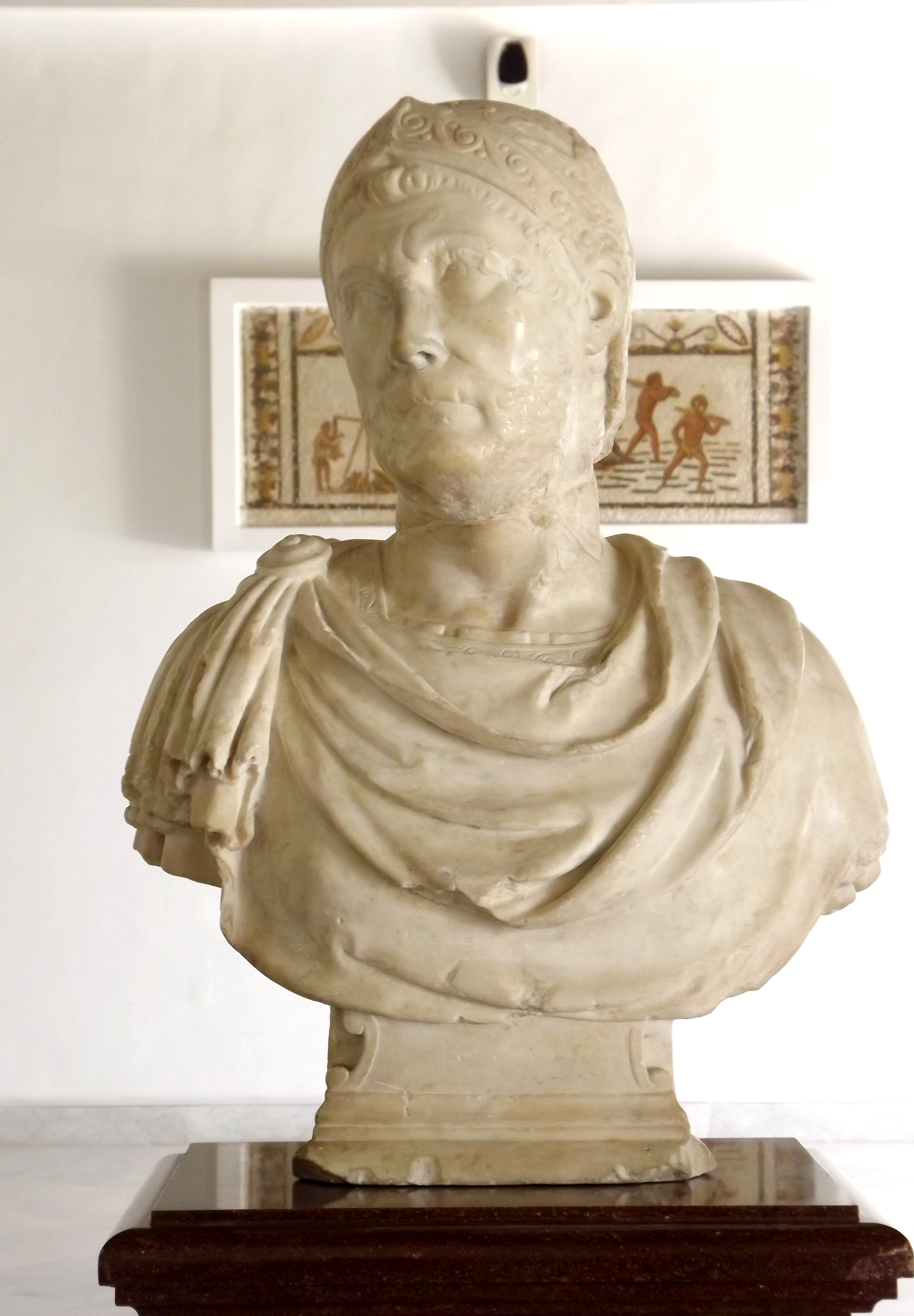
A bust of Hannibal, Bardo National Museum, Tunisia

Hannibal was 46 at the conclusion of the Second Punic War in 201 BC and quickly showed that he could be a statesman as well as a soldier. Following the conclusion of a peace that left Carthage saddled with an indemnity of ten thousand talents, he was elected suffete (chief magistrate) of the Carthaginian state. After an audit confirmed Carthage had the resources to pay the indemnity without increasing taxation, Hannibal initiated a reorganization of state finances aimed at eliminating corruption and recovering embezzled funds.

The principal beneficiaries of these financial peculations had been the oligarchs of the Hundred and Four. In order to reduce their power, Hannibal passed a law stipulating the Hundred and Four be chosen by direct election rather than co-option. He also used citizen support to change the term of office in the Hundred and Four from life to one year, with none permitted to hold office for two consecutive years.

=== Exile (after 195 BC) ===
Seven years after the victory of Zama, the Romans, alarmed by Carthage's renewed prosperity and suspicious that Hannibal had been in contact with Antiochus III of the Seleucid Empire, sent a delegation to Carthage alleging that Hannibal was helping an enemy of Rome. Aware that he had many enemies, not the least of which were because of his financial reforms eliminating corruption, Hannibal fled into voluntary exile before the Romans could demand that Carthage surrender him into their custody.

He journeyed first to Tyre, the mother city of Carthage, and then to Antioch, before he finally reached Ephesus where he was honourably received by Antiochus. Livy states that Antiochus consulted Hannibal on the strategic concerns of making war on Rome. According to Cicero, while at the court of Antiochus, Hannibal attended a lecture by Phormio, a philosopher, that ranged through many topics. When Phormio finished a discourse on the duties of a general, Hannibal was asked his opinion. He replied, "I have seen during my life many old fools; but this one beats them all." Another story, according to Aulus Gellius, is that after Antiochus showed Hannibal the gigantic and elaborately equipped army he had created to invade Greece, he asked him if they would be enough for the Roman Republic, to which Hannibal replied, "I think all this will be enough, yes, quite enough, for the Romans, even though they are most avaricious."

In the summer of 193 BC, tensions flared up between the Seleucids and Rome. Antiochus gave tacit support to Hannibal's plans of launching an anti-Roman coup d'état in Carthage, yet it was not carried out. Hannibal advised equipping a fleet and landing a body of troops in the south of Italy, offering to take command himself. In 190 BC, after having suffered a series of defeats in the Roman–Seleucid war, Antiochus gave Hannibal his first significant military command after spending five years in the Seleucid court. Hannibal was tasked with building a fleet in Cilicia from scratch. Although Phoenician territories like Tyre and Sidon possessed the necessary combination of raw materials, technical expertise, and experienced personnel, it took much longer than expected for it to be completed, most likely due to wartime shortages.

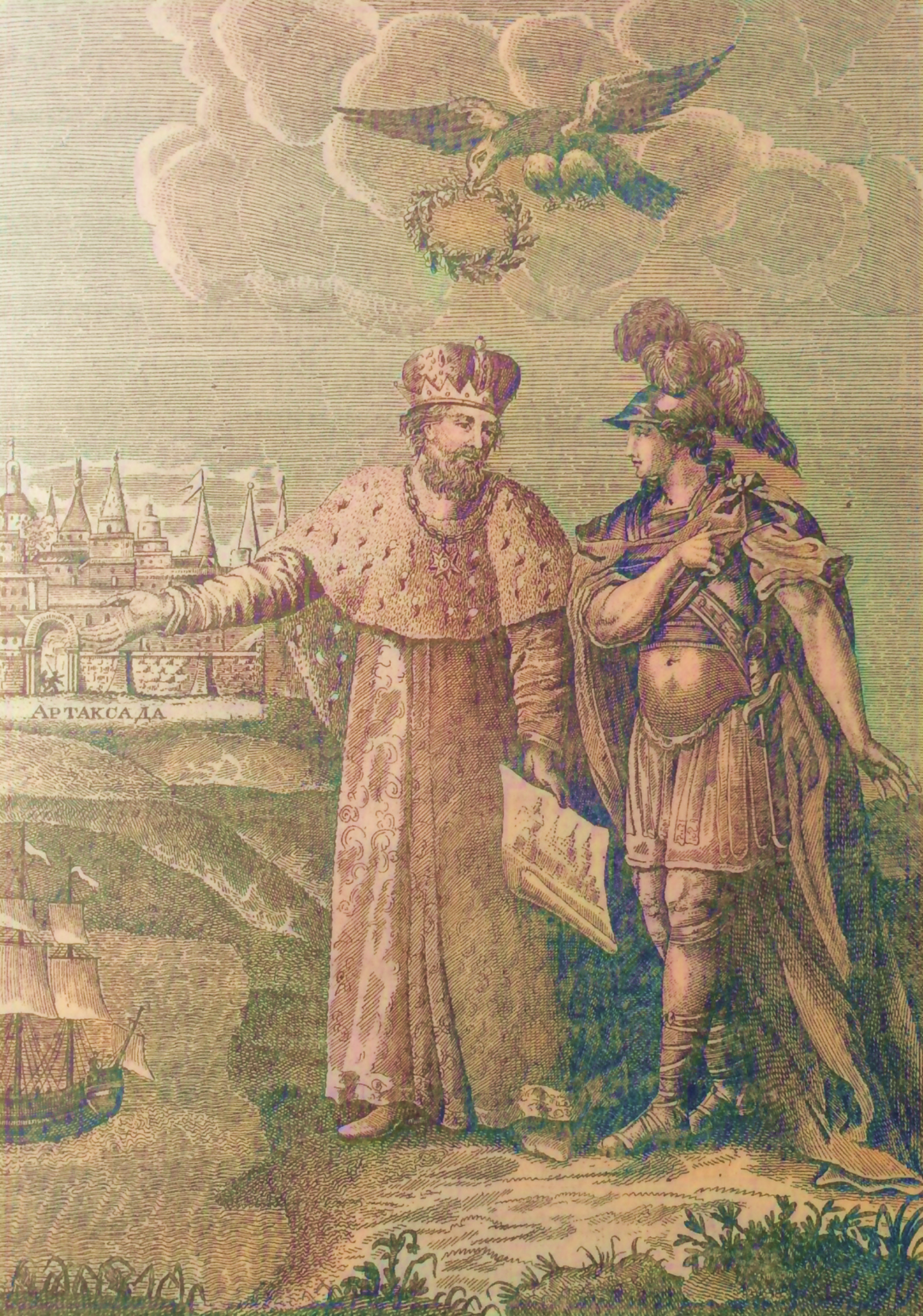
Hannibal with Artaxias I of Greater Armenia in Ayrarat.

In July 190 BC Hannibal ordered his fleet to set sail from Seleucia Pieria in order to reinforce the rest of the Seleucid navy at Ephesus. The following month Hannibal's fleet clashed with the Rhodian navy in the Battle of Side. The faster Rhodian ships managed to heavily damage half of Hannibal's warships through the diekplous manoeuvre, forcing him to retreat. Hannibal had preserved most of his fleet; however, he was in no position to unite with Polyxenidas' fleet at Ephesus since his ships required extensive repairs.

The ensuing Battle of Myonessus resulted in a Roman-Rhodian victory, which cemented Roman control over the Aegean Sea, enabling them to launch an invasion of Seleucid Asia Minor. The two armies faced off in the Battle of Magnesia, resulting in a decisive Roman-Pergamene victory. The truce was signed at Sardes in January 189 BC, whereupon Antiochus agreed to abandon his claims on all lands west of the Taurus Mountains, paid a heavy war indemnity, and promised to hand over Hannibal and other notable enemies of Rome from among his allies.

According to Strabo and Plutarch, Hannibal received hospitality at the Armenian royal court of Artaxias I. The authors add an apocryphal story of how Hannibal planned and supervised the building of the new royal capital Artaxata. Suspicious that Antiochus was prepared to surrender him to the Romans, Hannibal fled to Crete, but he soon went back to Anatolia and sought refuge with Prusias I of Bithynia, who was engaged in warfare with Rome's ally, King Eumenes II of Pergamon. Hannibal went on to serve Prusias in this war. In 190 BC he gained a naval victory over Eumenes by throwing clay pots filled with venomous snakes onto Eumenes' ships. In 184 BC Hannibal defeated Eumenes two more times in battles on land.

=== Death (183–181 BC) ===
At this stage, the Romans intervened and threatened Bithynia into giving up Hannibal. Prusias agreed, but Hannibal was determined not to fall into his enemy's hands. The precise year and cause of Hannibal's death are unknown. Pausanias writes that Hannibal's death occurred after his finger was wounded by his drawn sword while mounting his horse, resulting in a fever and then his death three days later. Cornelius Nepos and Livy tell a different story, namely that the ex-consul Titus Quinctius Flamininus, on discovering that Hannibal was in Bithynia, went there in an embassy to demand his surrender from Prusias. Hannibal, discovering that the castle where he was living was surrounded by Roman soldiers and he could not escape, took poison. Appian writes that it was Prusias who poisoned Hannibal.

Pliny the Elder and Plutarch, in his Life of Flamininus, record that Hannibal's tomb was at Libyssa on the coast of the Sea of Marmara. According to some, Libyssa was sited at Gebze, between Bursa and Üskudar. W. M. Leake, identifying Gebze with ancient Dakibyza, places it further west. Before dying, Hannibal is said to have left behind a letter declaring, "Let us relieve the Romans from the anxiety they have so long experienced, since they think it tries their patience too much to wait for an old man's death".

Appian writes of a prophecy about Hannibal's death, which states that "Libyssan earth shall cover Hannibal's remains." This, he writes, made Hannibal believe that he would die in Libya, but instead it was at the Bithynian Libyssa that he would die. In his Annales, Titus Pomponius Atticus reports that Hannibal's death occurred in 183 BC, and Livy implies the same. Polybius, who wrote nearest the event, gives 182 BC. Sulpicius Blitho records the death under 181 BC.

== Legacy ==
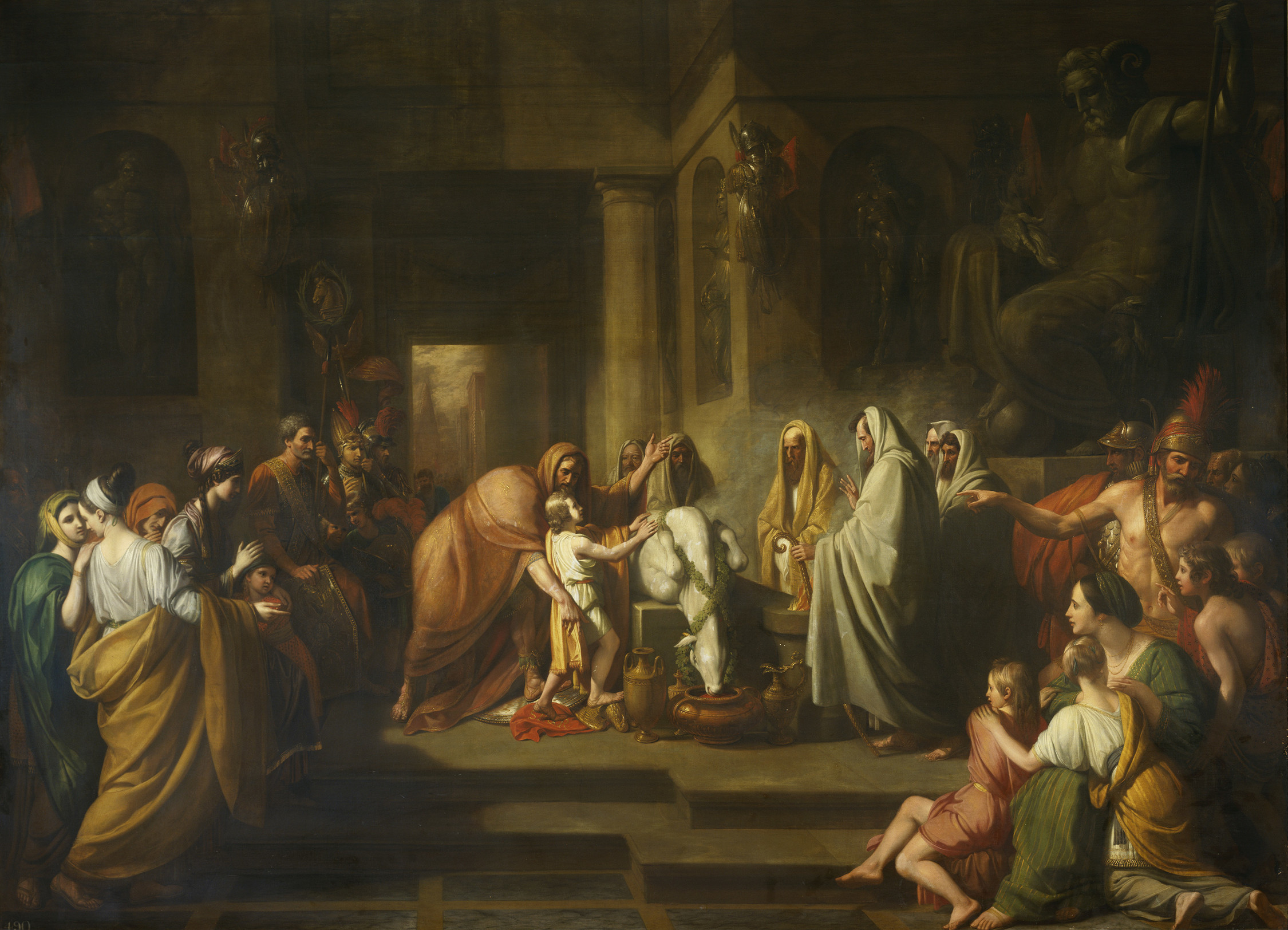
The Oath of Hannibal by Benjamin West, 1770

=== Ancient world ===
Hannibal caused great distress to many in Roman society. He became such a figure of terror that whenever disaster threatened, Romans would exclaim "Hannibal ad portas" ("Hannibal is at the gates!") to emphasize the gravity of the emergency, a phrase still used in modern languages.

His legacy was recorded by his Greek tutor, Sosylus of Lacedaemon. The works of Roman writers such as Livy (64 or 59 BC – AD 12 or 17), Frontinus (c. AD 40–103), and Juvenal (1st–2nd century AD) show a grudging admiration for Hannibal. The Romans even built statues of him in the streets of Rome to advertise their defeat of such a worthy adversary. It is plausible to suggest that Hannibal engendered the greatest fear Rome had towards an enemy. Nevertheless, the Romans grimly refused to admit the possibility of defeat and rejected all overtures for peace; they even refused to accept the ransom of prisoners after the Battle of Cannae.

During the war there are no reports of revolutions among the Roman citizens, no factions within the Senate desiring peace, no pro-Carthaginian Roman turncoats, and no coups. Throughout the war, Roman aristocrats ferociously competed with each other for positions of command to fight against Rome's most dangerous enemy. Hannibal's military genius was not enough to really disturb the Roman political process and the collective political and military capacity of the Roman people. As Lazenby states,

It says volumes, too, for their political maturity and respect for constitutional forms that the complicated machinery of government continued to function even amidst disaster—there are few states in the ancient world in which a general who had lost a battle like Cannae would have dared to remain, let alone would have continued to be treated respectfully as head of state.

According to Livy, the Romans feared Hannibal's military genius, and during Hannibal's march against Rome in 211 BC:

a messenger who had travelled from Fregellae for a day and a night without stopping created great alarm in Rome, and the excitement was increased by people running about the City with wildly exaggerated accounts of the news he had brought. The wailing cry of the matrons was heard everywhere, not only in private houses but even in the temples. Here they knelt and swept the temple-floors with their dishevelled hair and lifted up their hands to heaven in piteous entreaty to the gods that they would deliver the City of Rome out of the hands of the enemy and preserve its mothers and children from injury and outrage.

In the Senate, the news was "received with varying feelings as men's temperaments differed", so it was decided to keep Capua under siege but to send 15,000 infantry and 1,000 cavalry as reinforcements to Rome.

According to Livy, the land occupied by Hannibal's army outside Rome in 211 BC was sold by a Roman while it was occupied. This may not be true, but as Lazenby states, "could well be, exemplifying as it does not only the supreme confidence felt by the Romans in ultimate victory, but also the way in which something like normal life continued." After Cannae, the Romans showed considerable steadfastness. As an example of Rome's confidence, after the Cannae disaster she was left virtually defenseless; however, the Senate still chose not to withdraw a single garrison from an overseas province to strengthen the city. In fact, they were reinforced and the campaigns there maintained until victory was secured; beginning first in Sicily under the direction of Claudius Marcellus, and later in Hispania under Scipio Africanus. Although the long-term consequences of Hannibal's war are debatable, this war was undeniably Rome's "finest hour".

Most of the sources available to historians about Hannibal are from Romans. They considered him the greatest enemy Rome had ever faced. Livy indicates that Hannibal was extremely cruel. Even Cicero, when he talked of Rome and its two great enemies, spoke of the "honourable" Pyrrhus and the "cruel" Hannibal. Yet a different picture sometimes emerges. When Hannibal's successes had brought about the death of two Roman consuls, he vainly searched for the body of Gaius Flaminius on the shores of Lake Trasimene, held ceremonial rituals in recognition of Lucius Aemilius Paullus, and sent Marcellus' ashes back to his family in Rome. Any bias attributed to Polybius, however, is more troublesome. Historian Ronald Mellor considers the Greek scholar a loyal partisan of Scipio Aemilianus, while H. Ormerod does not view him as an "altogether unprejudiced witness" when it came to his pet peeves, the Aetolians, the Carthaginians, and the Cretans. Nonetheless, Polybius did recognize that the reputation for cruelty the Romans attached to Hannibal might in reality have been by mistaking him for one of his officers, Hannibal Monomachus.

In the Severan period, Hannibal was portrayed as a successful military leader from history who could serve as an exemplary figure for a Roman audience. In the 13th century, Byzantine scholar John Tzetzes writes that Severus (likely Septimius Severus), being of Libyan birth, constructed a tomb of white marble for Hannibal in Libyssa. Scholars debate whether this act was intended to promote a unified North African identity, stimulate local economic interests, or link Severus with past military heroes to strengthen his legacy, reflecting a broader Severan policy of honoring local traditions and historical figures.

=== Military history ===
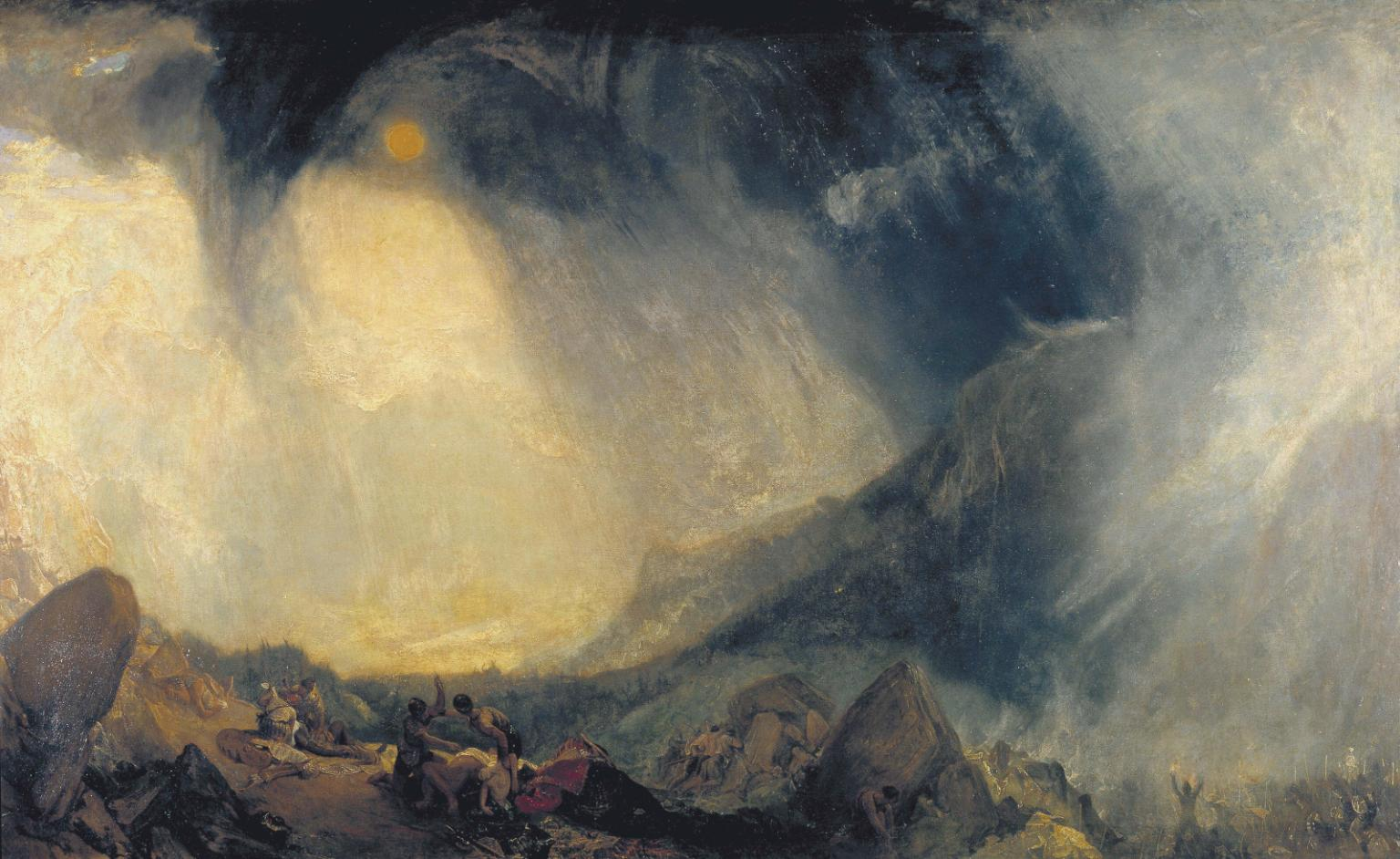
The material of legend: in Snow Storm: Hannibal and his Army Crossing the Alps (1812) J. M. W. Turner envelops Hannibal's crossing of the Alps in Romantic atmosphere.

Hannibal is generally regarded as one of the best military strategists and tacticians of all time, with the double envelopment at Cannae enduring a legacy of tactical brilliance. Military academies all over the world continue to study Hannibal's exploits, especially his victory at Cannae. According to Appian, several years after the Second Punic War, Hannibal served as a political advisor in the Seleucid Kingdom and Scipio arrived there on a diplomatic mission from Rome.

It is said that at one of their meetings in the gymnasium Scipio and Hannibal had a conversation on the subject of generalship, in the presence of a number of bystanders, and that Scipio asked Hannibal whom he considered the greatest general, to which the latter replied "Alexander of Macedonia".

To this Scipio assented since he also yielded the first place to Alexander. Then he asked Hannibal whom he placed next, and he replied "Pyrrhus of Epirus", because he considered boldness the first qualification of a general; "for it would not be possible", he said, "to find two kings more enterprising than these".

Scipio was rather nettled by this, but nevertheless he asked Hannibal to whom he would give the third place, expecting that at least the third would be assigned to him; but Hannibal replied, "to myself; for when I was a young man I conquered Hispania and crossed the Alps with an army, the first after Hercules."

As Scipio saw that he was likely to prolong his self-laudation he said, laughing, "where would you place yourself, Hannibal, if you had not been defeated by me?" Hannibal, now perceiving his jealousy, replied, "in that case I should have put myself before Alexander". Thus Hannibal continued his self-laudation, but flattered Scipio in an indirect manner by suggesting that he had conquered one who was the superior of Alexander.

At the end of this conversation Hannibal invited Scipio to be his guest, and Scipio replied that he would be so gladly if Hannibal were not living with Antiochus, who was held in suspicion by the Romans. Thus did they, in a manner worthy of great commanders, cast aside their enmity at the end of their wars.

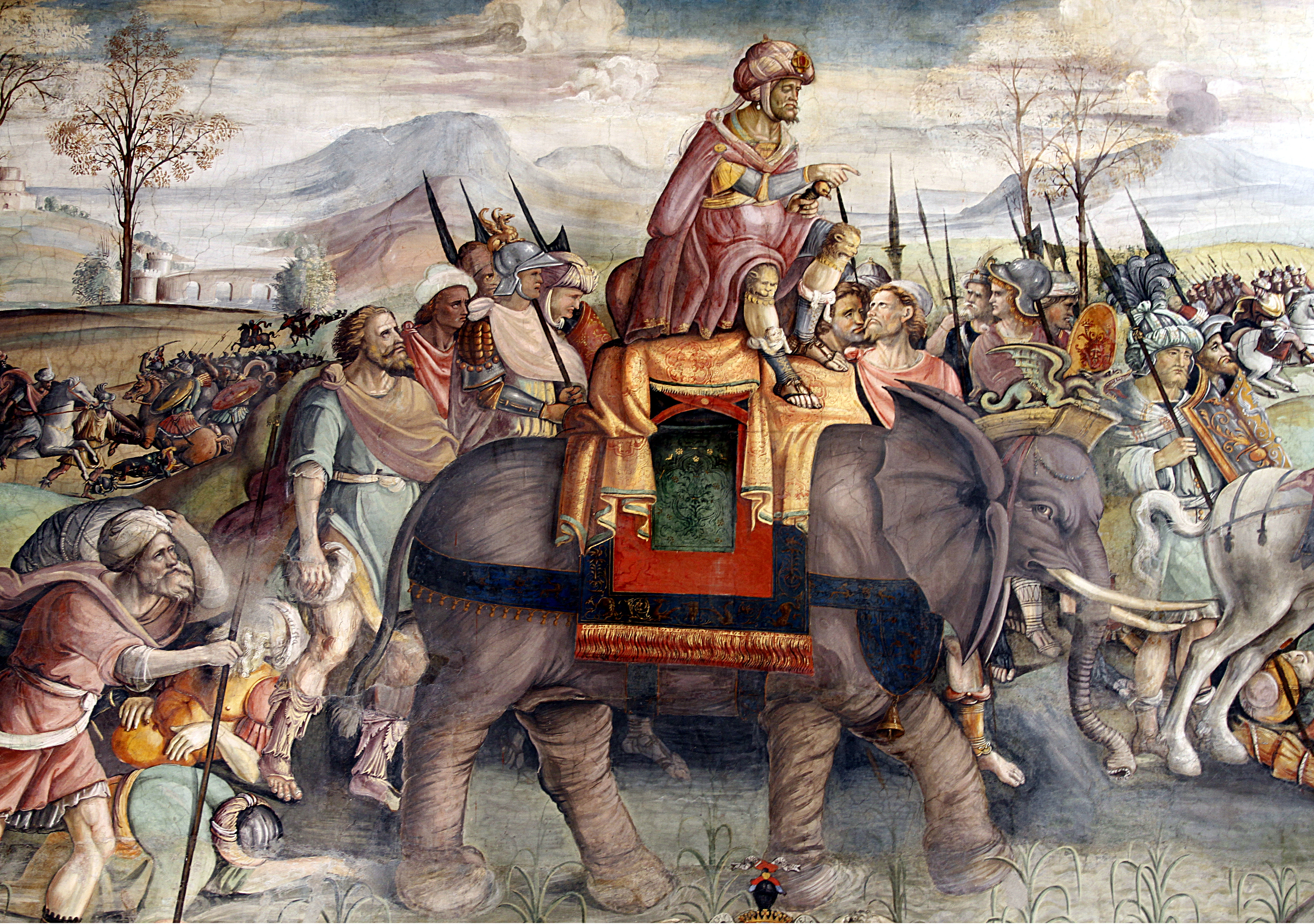
Hannibal's celebrated feat in crossing the Alps with war elephants passed into European legend: detail of a fresco by Jacopo Ripanda, c. 1510, Capitoline Museums, Rome.

Maximilian Otto Bismarck Caspari in his article in the Encyclopædia Britannica Eleventh Edition (1910–1911), praises Hannibal in these words:

As to the transcendent military genius of Hannibal there cannot be two opinions. The man who for fifteen years could hold his ground in a hostile country against several powerful armies and a succession of able generals must have been a commander and a tactician of supreme capacity. In the use of strategies and ambuscades he certainly surpassed all other generals of antiquity. Wonderful as his achievements were, we must marvel the more when we take into account the grudging support he received from Carthage. As his veterans melted away, he had to organize fresh levies on the spot. We never hear of a mutiny in his army, composed though it was of North Africans, Iberians and Gauls. Again, all we know of him comes for the most part from hostile sources. The Romans feared and hated him so much that they could not do him justice. Livy speaks of his great qualities, but he adds that his vices were equally great, among which he singles out his more than Punic perfidy and an inhuman cruelty. For the first there would seem to be no further justification than that he was consummately skillful in the use of ambuscades. For the latter there is, we believe, no more ground than that at certain crises he acted in the general spirit of ancient warfare. Sometimes he contrasts most favorably with his enemy. No such brutality stains his name as that perpetrated by Gaius Claudius Nero on the vanquished Hasdrubal. Polybius merely says that he was accused of cruelty by the Romans and of avarice by the Carthaginians. He had indeed bitter enemies, and his life was one continuous struggle against destiny. For steadfastness of purpose, for organizing capacity and a mastery of military science he has perhaps never had an equal.

Even the Roman chroniclers acknowledged Hannibal's supreme military leadership, writing that "he never required others to do what he could not and would not do himself". According to Polybius 23, 13, p. 423:

It is a remarkable and very cogent proof of Hannibal's having been by nature a real leader and far superior to anyone else in statesmanship, that though he spent seventeen years in the field, passed through so many barbarous countries, and employed to aid him in desperate and extraordinary enterprises numbers of men of different nations and languages, no one ever dreamt of conspiring against him, nor was he ever deserted by those who had once joined him or submitted to him.

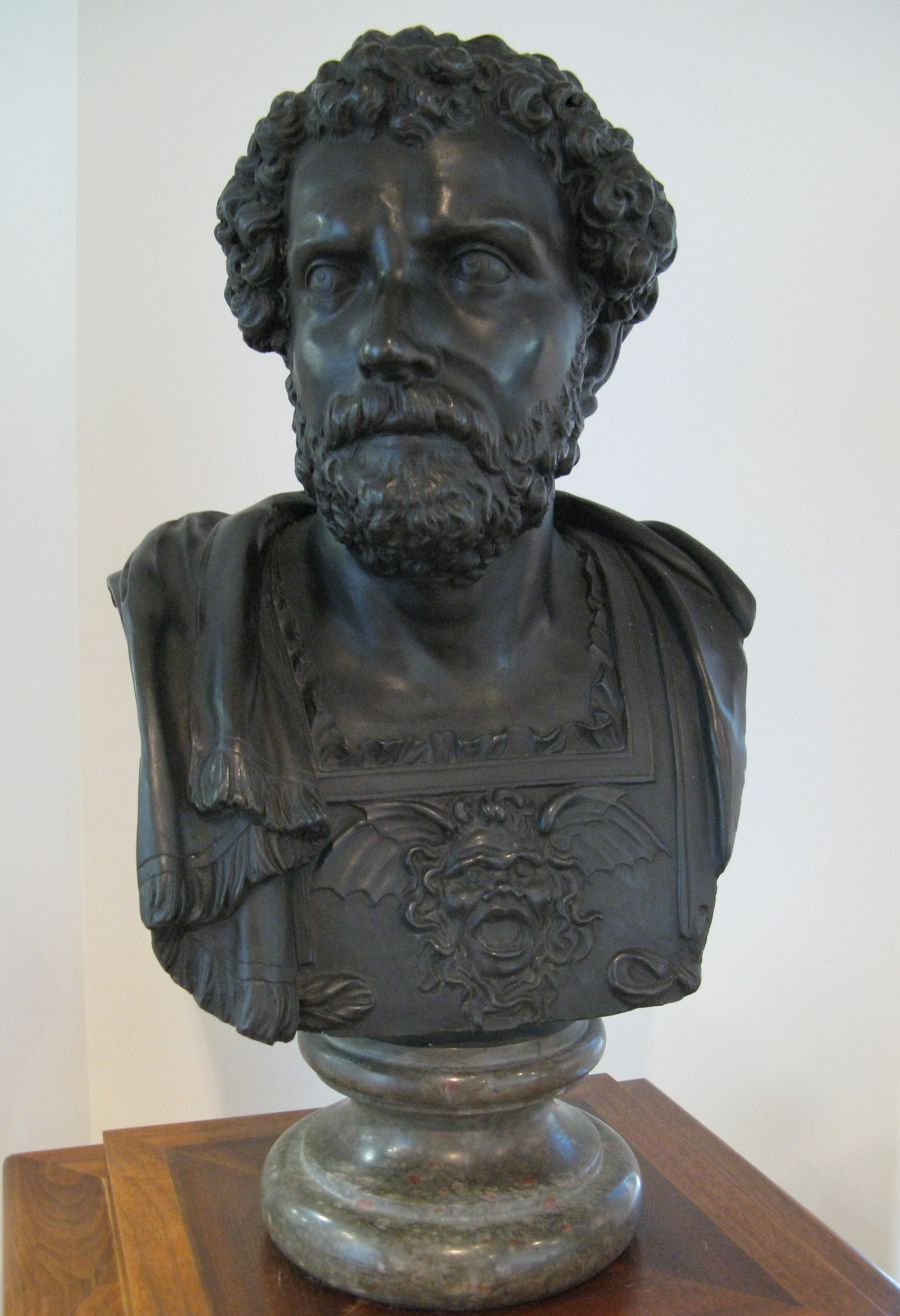
A bust of Hannibal, 17th century, Museum of Antiquities (Saskatoon)

Prior to World War I, Count Alfred von Schlieffen developed his "Schlieffen Plan" from his military studies, including the envelopment technique that Hannibal employed in the Battle of Cannae. George S. Patton believed himself a reincarnation of Hannibal—as well as of many other people, including a Roman legionary and a Napoleonic soldier. Norman Schwarzkopf Jr., the commander of the Coalition of the Gulf War of 1990–1991, claimed, "The technology of war may change, the sophistication of weapons certainly changes. But those same principles of war that applied to the days of Hannibal apply today."

According to the military historian Theodore Ayrault Dodge,

Hannibal excelled as a tactician. No battle in history is a finer sample of tactics than Cannae. But he was yet greater in logistics and strategy. No captain ever marched to and fro among so many armies of troops superior to his own numbers and material as fearlessly and skilfully as he. No man ever held his own so long or so ably against such odds. Constantly overmatched by better soldiers, led by generals always respectable, often of great ability, he yet defied all their efforts to drive him from Italy, for half a generation. Excepting in the case of Alexander, and some few isolated instances, all wars up to the Second Punic War, had been decided largely, if not entirely, by battle-tactics. Strategic ability had been comprehended only on a minor scale. Armies had marched towards each other, had fought in parallel order, and the conqueror had imposed terms on his opponent. Any variation from this rule consisted in ambuscades or other stratagems. That war could be waged by avoiding in lieu of seeking battle; that the results of a victory could be earned by attacks upon the enemy's communications, by flank-manoeuvres, by seizing positions from which safely to threaten him in case he moved, and by other devices of strategy, was not understood... [However,] for the first time in the history of war, we see two contending generals avoiding each other, occupying impregnable camps on heights, marching about each other's flanks to seize cities or supplies in their rear, harassing each other with small-war, and rarely venturing on a battle which might prove a fatal disaster—all with a well-conceived purpose of placing his opponent at a strategic disadvantage... That it did so was due to the teaching of Hannibal.

=== In modern Tunisia ===
Due to his origin and connection with the territory belonging to modern-day Tunisia, he is widely revered as a national hero in the country. Hannibal's likeness is depicted on the Tunisian five-dinar bill issued on 8 November 1993, as well as on a bill put into circulation on 20 March 2013. His name appears in the name of a private television channel, Hannibal TV. A street in Carthage, located near the Punic ports, bears his name; as does as a station on the TGM railway line: "Carthage Hannibal". Plans envisage a mausoleum and a 17-metre (56 ft) high colossus of Hannibal on the Byrsa, the highest point of Carthage overlooking Tunis.

=== Other ===
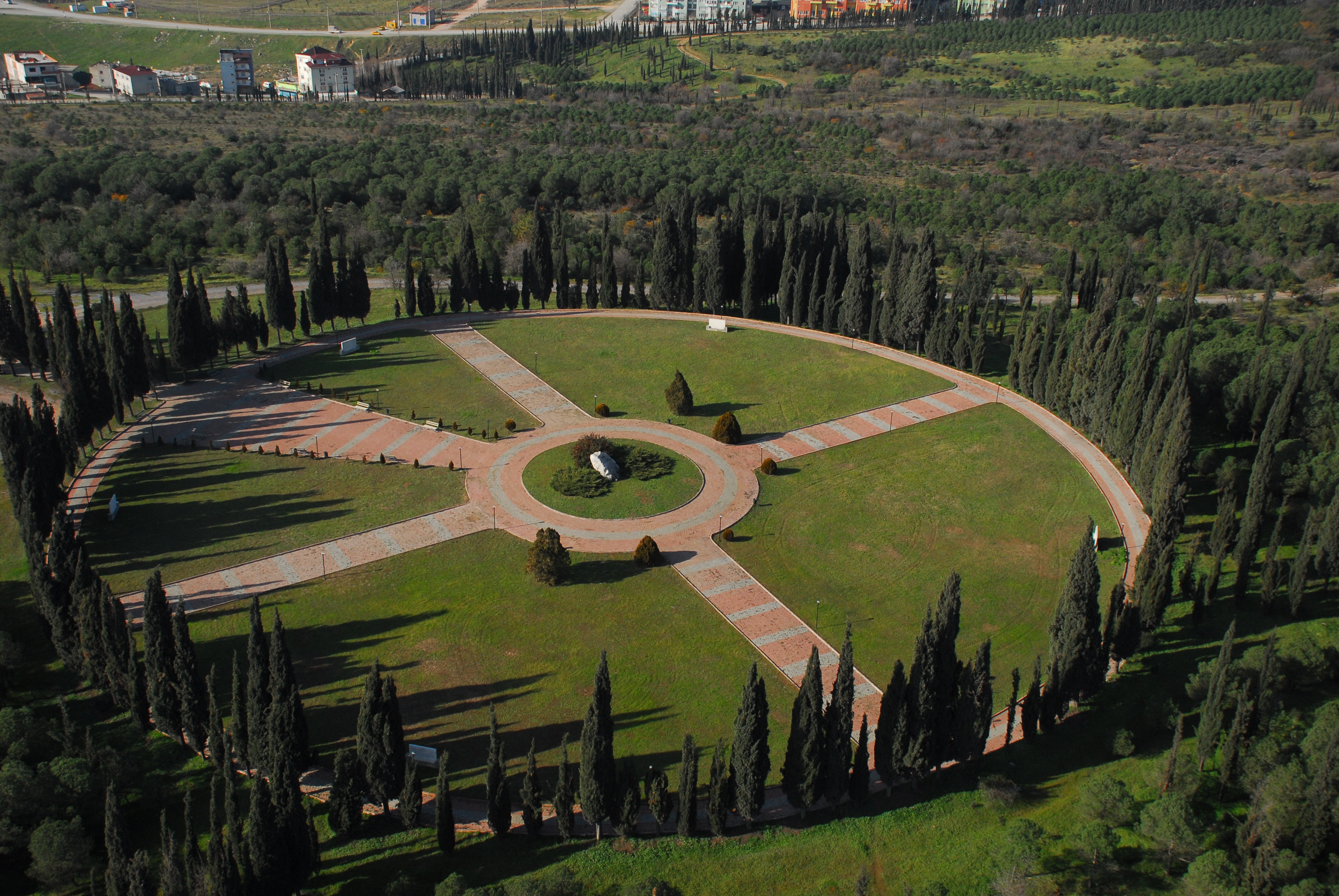
Hannibal's monumental tomb in Kocaeli, Turkey

The teenaged Sigmund Freud regarded Hannibal as a "hero"; the founder of psychoanalysis portrays an idealized image of Hannibal in his analysis of his "dreams of Rome" in The Interpretation of Dreams. Freud associates this phenomenon with the adage "All roads lead to Rome". He writes: "Hannibal and Rome symbolized for the adolescent that I was the opposition between the tenacity of Judaism and the organizing spirit of the Catholic Church".

Kocaeli in Turkey has a cenotaph built in Hannibal's memory. Even though the location of Hannibal's tomb could not be determined precisely in the studies carried out through President Atatürk's great interest, a monumental cenotaph was built in 1981 in the south of present-day Gebze as an expression of Atatürk's respect for Hannibal.

=== Popular culture ===
In November 2023, it was announced Antoine Fuqua would reunite with Denzel Washington on a film about Hannibal for Netflix, with John Logan writing the screenplay. This fell through. Another production of Hannibal Barca is in development by Ken Sibanda, based on his opera and graphic novels, Hannibal the Great: An Opera.

== Timeline ==
Timeline of Hannibal's life (248 BC – c. 183 BC)

== Battle record ==
| Allegiance | War | Year | Action |
|---|---|---|---|
| Carthaginian Empire | Barcid conquest of Hispania | 221 BC | Siege of Alithia |
| Carthaginian Empire | Barcid conquest of Hispania | 220 BC | Siege of Helmantice |
| Carthaginian Empire | Barcid conquest of Hispania | 220 BC | Siege of Arbucala |
| Carthaginian Empire | Barcid conquest of Hispania | 220 BC | Battle of the Tagus |
| Carthaginian Empire | Barcid conquest of Hispania | 219 BC | Siege of Saguntum |
| Carthaginian Empire | Second Punic War | 219 BC | Siege of Saguntum |
| Carthaginian Empire | Second Punic War | 218 BC | Battle of Rhone Crossing |
| Carthaginian Empire | Second Punic War | 218 BC | Battle of Ticinus |
| Carthaginian Empire | Second Punic War | 218 BC | Battle of the Trebia |
| Carthaginian Empire | Second Punic War | 217 BC | Battle of Victumulae |
| Carthaginian Empire | Second Punic War | 217 BC | Battle of Lake Trasimene |
| Carthaginian Empire | Second Punic War | 217 BC | Battle of Ager Falernus |
| Carthaginian Empire | Second Punic War | 217 BC | Battle of Geronium |
| Carthaginian Empire | Second Punic War | 216 BC | Battle of Cannae |
| Carthaginian Empire | Second Punic War | 216 BC | Battle of Nola |
| Carthaginian Empire | Second Punic War | 216 BC | Siege of Casilinum |
| Carthaginian Empire | Second Punic War | 215 BC | Battle of Nola |
| Carthaginian Empire | Second Punic War | 214 BC | Battle of Nola |
| Carthaginian Empire | Second Punic War | 212 BC | Battle of Tarentum |
| Carthaginian Empire | Second Punic War | 212 BC | Battle of Capua |
| Carthaginian Empire | Second Punic War | 212 BC | Battle of the Silarus |
| Carthaginian Empire | Second Punic War | 212 BC | Battle of Herdonia |
| Carthaginian Empire | Second Punic War | 211 BC | Siege of Capua |
| Carthaginian Empire | Second Punic War | 211 BC | Raid on Rome |
| Carthaginian Empire | Second Punic War | 210 BC | Battle of Herdonia |
| Carthaginian Empire | Second Punic War | 210 BC | Battle of Numistro |
| Carthaginian Empire | Second Punic War | 209 BC | Battle of Canusium |
| Carthaginian Empire | Second Punic War | 209 BC | Battle of Caulonia |
| Carthaginian Empire | Second Punic War | 208 BC | Battle of Petelia |
| Carthaginian Empire | Second Punic War | 207 BC | Battle of Grumentum |
| Carthaginian Empire | Second Punic War | 204 BC | Battle of Crotona |
| Carthaginian Empire | Second Punic War | 202 BC | Battle of Zama |
| Seleucid Empire | Roman–Seleucid War | 190 BC | Battle of the Eurymedon |
| Bithynia | Second Pergamene-Bithynian War | 184 BC | Battle of the Sea of Marmara |

== See also ==
- Military of Carthage
- Alaric I
- Arminius
- Attila
- Bato the Daesitiate
- Boiorix
- Brennus (leader of the Senones)
- Mithridates VI of Pontus
- Odoacer
- Gaiseric
- Septimius Severus, who refurbished Hannibal's tomb
- Spartacus
- Theodoric the Great
