= Illiturgis =

Ancient city in Spain

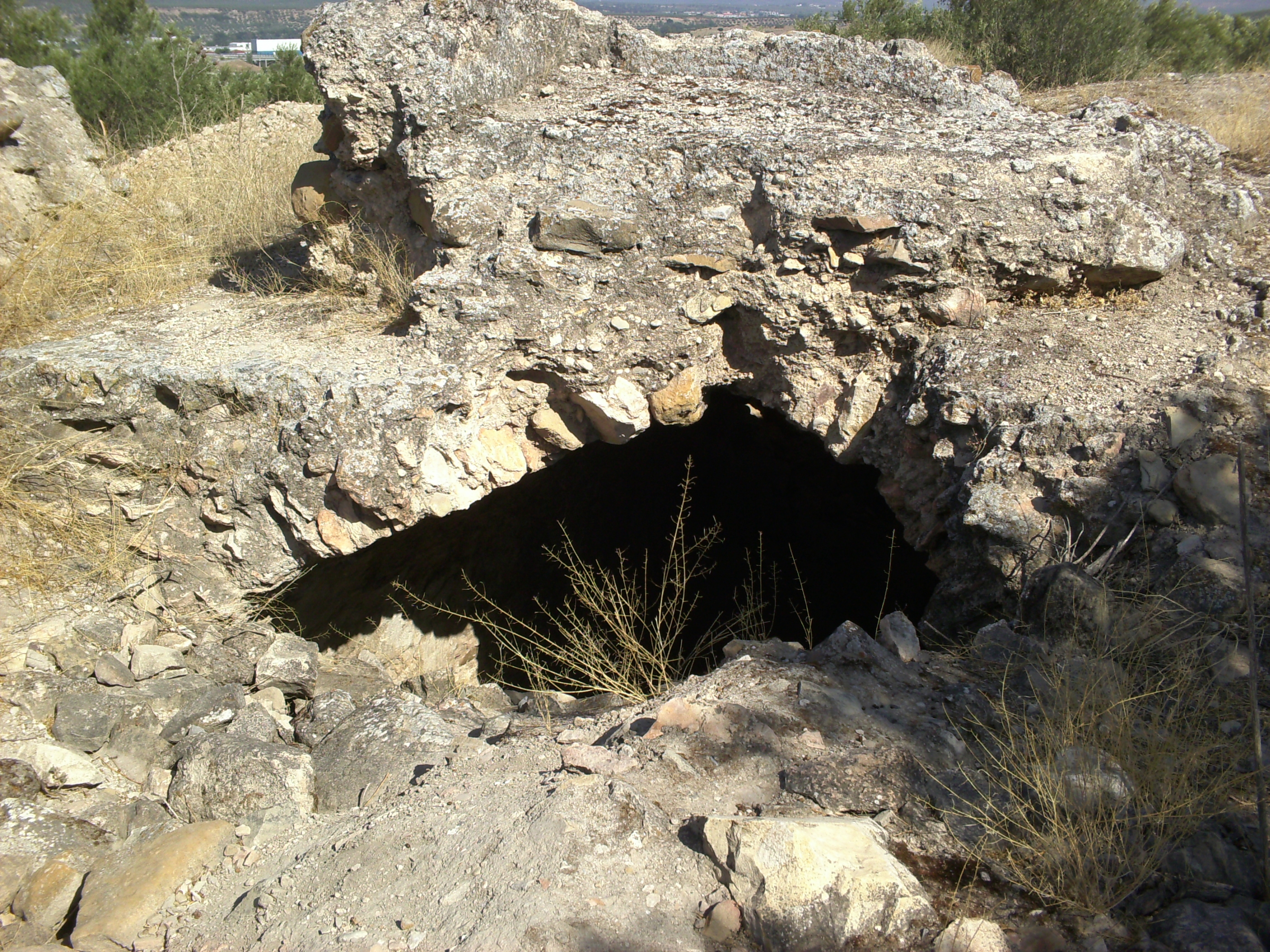
Remains of the cistern in the ancient roman city of Illiturgis

Illiturgis, also known as Iliturgi, was a city in Spain during antiquity, located on the road from Corduba to Castulo. Originally, it was located near the site of Mengíbar, but when it was destroyed the populace was relocated near present-day Andújar. It had the surname of Forum Julium during Roman times.

During the Second Punic War, it sided with the Romans, and was besieged by the Carthaginians. However, the sieges were raised. When the two Scipios, Publius and Calvus, were overthrown, Illiturgis and Castulo sided with the Carthaginians. In addition, according to Roman sources, the citizens of Illiturgis are said to have executed the Romans who had fled to the city for refuge during the war. Scipio Africanus stormed the city in 206 BC and burnt the corpses of the slaughtered townspeople. (see below a detailed description of events during the Second Punic War).

As a Roman city, Illiturgis was part of the province of Hispania Baetica, and grew in size. Saint Euphrasius of Illiturgis is said to have been its first Christian bishop. In the 7th century, Sisebut built a church over the Euphrasius' sepulcher at Illiturgis, but during the invasion of Spain by the Moors in the 8th century, Euphrasius' relics were translated to Galicia.

== Geography ==
Illiturgis was a city of Hispania Baetica and was situated on steep mountainous terrain located on the northern side of the River Baetis. It is on the road to the neighboring cities of Corduba and Castulo, which is believed to be a five-day march from Carthago Nova, modern day Cartagena, Spain. Since the city was destroyed and repopulated, it is likely that two sites share the same name. One site is believed to be on the hill Maquiz, Mengibar in Spain. After it was destroyed, the second location is believed to have been part of the area around the modern city of Andujar, where the church of St. Potenciana currently stands.

There is a major problem with the city's location in the works of Livy and Coelius. Reportedly, it was common for them to purposely substitute the names of known cities for unknown ones. For example, the site of Ilorci is most likely not equivalent to Livy's Illiturgis because it is believed that, when the Roman soldiers took refuge in Illiturgis, they actually went to the neighboring town of Ilorci instead. This is a possible theory, as it suggests that Illiturgis was much deeper in the enemy's territory which was near Mengibar, a few miles south of Bailen.

== Second Punic War ==
During the Second Punic War, Illiturgis tried to be on both the Roman and Carthaginian sides. When Rome had the upper hand in the battle for Spain, they would support Rome so as to keep themselves alive and well, this would also apply when Carthage had the advantage in Spain. However, this switching of sides did not sit well with Rome and was only made worse as the war progressed.

In 215 BC, during the Second Punic War, the Spanish city of Illiturgis had become a colony of the Roman Republic. It came under attack by Hannibal and the Carthaginian armies while the Spanish army was in dire need of provisions. Rome came to their aid by sending supplies such as clothing and food. This act would serve the Romans well, as they gained the support of the inhabitants of the city to help them defend their home against the Carthaginians. Rome was very successful in capturing three of the Carthaginian camps, ultimately causing the siege of Illiturgis to be abandoned. In the end, the Romans defeated the Carthaginians and eventually all the tribes.

During the Second Punic War, Rome had been betrayed by numerous communities within Spain, and it was clear to the Romans that these towns were well aware of their tyranny. According to Livy, out of all the cities to betray the Romans, Illiturgis was one of the most significant cities in size and in guilt to go against their authority. Prior to Africanus arriving in Spain, his father and his uncle were sent with a large Roman army composed of both mercenaries and Roman soldiers. Their ultimate goal was to take Spain and secure a method of travel to assault Carthage. However, they were divided and defeated with both Scipios killed in battle. Some survivors fled to Illiturgis in the hope of a safe refuge. The people of Illiturgis betrayed the Romans by defecting to Carthage and by killing the Roman soldiers who sought protection in their town. Hence, Scipio Africanus felt it only necessary for himself to carry out the punishment as a result of their disloyalty to the empire.

=== Destruction ===
The destruction of Illiturgis had two purposes according to Livy. One, was to avenge the lives of the soldiers that had been betrayed by the inhabitants. The other purpose was to show that Rome did not take kindly to those who betrayed them and would punish them accordingly. The young Scipio Africanus was the only one who asked to undertake the re-subjugation of Spain and in particular the cities that had betrayed Rome.

In 206 BC, Scipio marched for five days with an army to the city of Illiturgis, where he planned to seize control of the land and destroy every building and inhabitant for their wrongdoings against Rome. When Scipio arrived, the city was heavily fortified by both its natural and man made defenses, however the garrison there was smaller than what would normally be required to safeguard the city. Knowing that the Roman army would arrive, the city shut its gates to everyone on the outside. This gave the Romans the perception that the inhabitants were fearful of their treason. When the battle began, Scipio had only sent a small amount of his forces with ladders to assault the city. This assault failed and encouraged the citizens of Illiturgis to fight on. In that engagement, the people of Illiturgis had suffered heavy losses to their already small forces, while the Romans suffered relatively little losses, which is what Scipio had wanted. After this, Scipio rallied his men in an encouraging speech where he demanded that the Spaniards be punished in the most severe manner for their crimes. Launching a fresh assault with his entire force, the Romans eventually took the city walls, and then the city itself.

Africanus was angry at the city for betraying Rome and killing the Romans who took refuge there. Therefore, he ordered that every single inhabitant be put to death. This was seen as barely justifiable even in Roman times. A more usual measure would have been to kill the men and sell the women and children into slavery.

==== Castulo and Astapa ====
This destruction and slaughter sent shock-waves throughout the region. Two cities in particular decided that they would meet a similar fate if they also tried to resist, but their solutions were different.

Castulo was a neighboring city that also sat alongside the river Baetis. Once the people of the city saw how Publius Cornelius Scipio had dealt with Illiturgis and its betrayal, they feared that they would meet a similar fate. They therefore surrendered without a fight in the hope of having a lesser punishment from the Roman army.

The citizens of Astapa (nowadays Estepa) interpreted the severity of the treatment Illiturgis differently from the people of Castulo. Fearing that they would be slaughtered in a similar fashion, they resolved to kill themselves and burn the city, as well as all of its treasures. Later, there would be a controversy over whether or not Scipio had caused the mass suicide of the people of Astapa. However, Livy believes that the city had acted out of fear of facing justice in general, not because of Scipio's extreme actions at Illiturgis.
