= Sosylus of Lacedaemon =

Ancient Greek historian

Sosylus
- Σωσύλος
- Occupation: Historian
- Employer: Hannibal
- Known for: Tutoring Hannibal

Sosylus of Lacedaemon (Greek: Σωσύλος) was a Greek historian in the 3rd century BC. He would campaign alongside Hannibal throughout the Second Punic War, teaching him Greek and recording the events of his campaign.

== Biography ==
There are some disputes regarding where Sosylus was born. The predominant theory sides with his epithet, claiming that he was born in Lacedaemon. There is evidence however, that he may have been born in Ilium or Elis as stated by competing testimony from Diodorus.

=== Serving Hannibal ===
Sosylus accompanied Hannibal during the Second Punic War and is the author of the Deeds of Hannibal, a lost historical work of seven volumes; only fragments of the work are known. It is often assumed that Sosylus only recounted the first part of the war due to Battle of Ebro River being recorded in the fourth volume of the work. Sosylus taught Hannibal Greek, while also recording the events of the war. He also is believed to have served as an advisor to Hannibal.

It is possible that Polybios may have used material from Sosylus' history for his writing about Hannibal in The Histories.
