= Imilce =

Wife of Punic general Hannibal

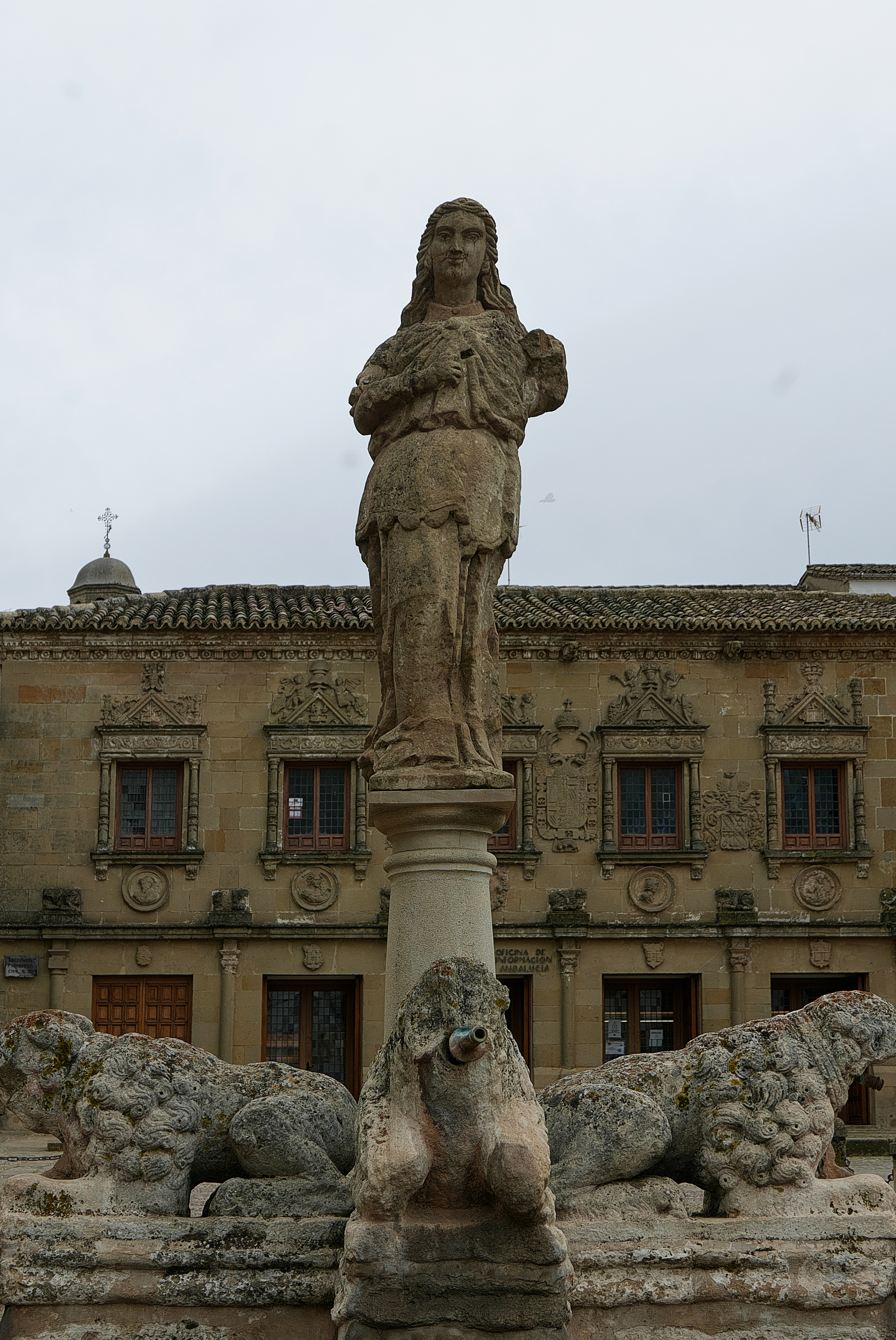
- Statue in Baeza named Himilce, princesa de Cástulo.
- Spouse: Hannibal Barca
- Children: Haspar Barca
- Family: Barcids (by marriage)

Imilce or Himilce was the Iberian wife of Hannibal Barca according to a number of historical sources.

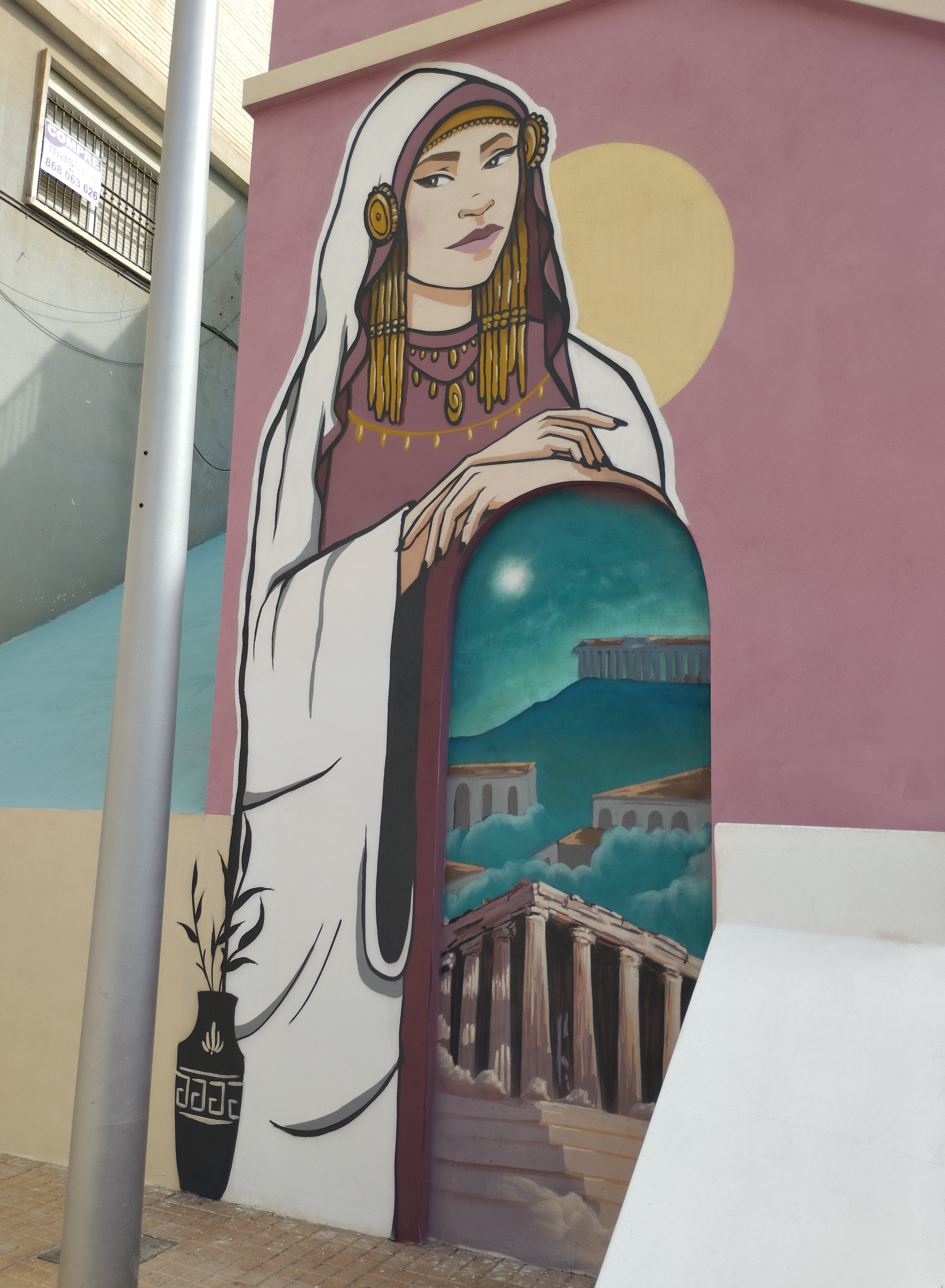
Mural portrait of Imilce in Cartagena, Spain

== History ==
Livy records that Hannibal married a woman from Castulo, a powerful Iberian city allied with Carthage. The Roman poet Silius Italicus identifies this woman as Imilce. Silius suggests a Greek origin for Imilce, but Gilbert Charles-Picard argued for a Punic heritage based on an etymology from the Semitic root m-l-k ('chief', 'king'). Silius also suggests the existence of a son, who is otherwise not attested by Livy, Polybius, or Appian. The son is thought to have been named Haspar or Aspar. According to Silius, during the Punic wars Hannibal tearfully sent Imilce and their son back to Carthage for their safety. Some historians have questioned the historicity of this event and suggested that it is an imitation of Pompey sending his wife away to Lucca for her safety during military conflict.

== Cultural depictions ==
Imilce is honored in Baeza, Andalusia with a statue as part of the Fuente de Los Leones (meaning Fountain of the Lions).

== See also ==
- List of the Pre-Roman peoples of the Iberian Peninsula
- Carthaginian Iberia
