= Castulo =

Ancient town & Roman Catholic titular see in Spain

Coordinates: 38.0359°N 3.6235°W

Castulo (Latin: Castulo; Iberian: Kastilo) was an Iberian town and bishopric (now Latin titular see located in the Andalusian province of Jaén, in south-central Spain, near modern Linares.

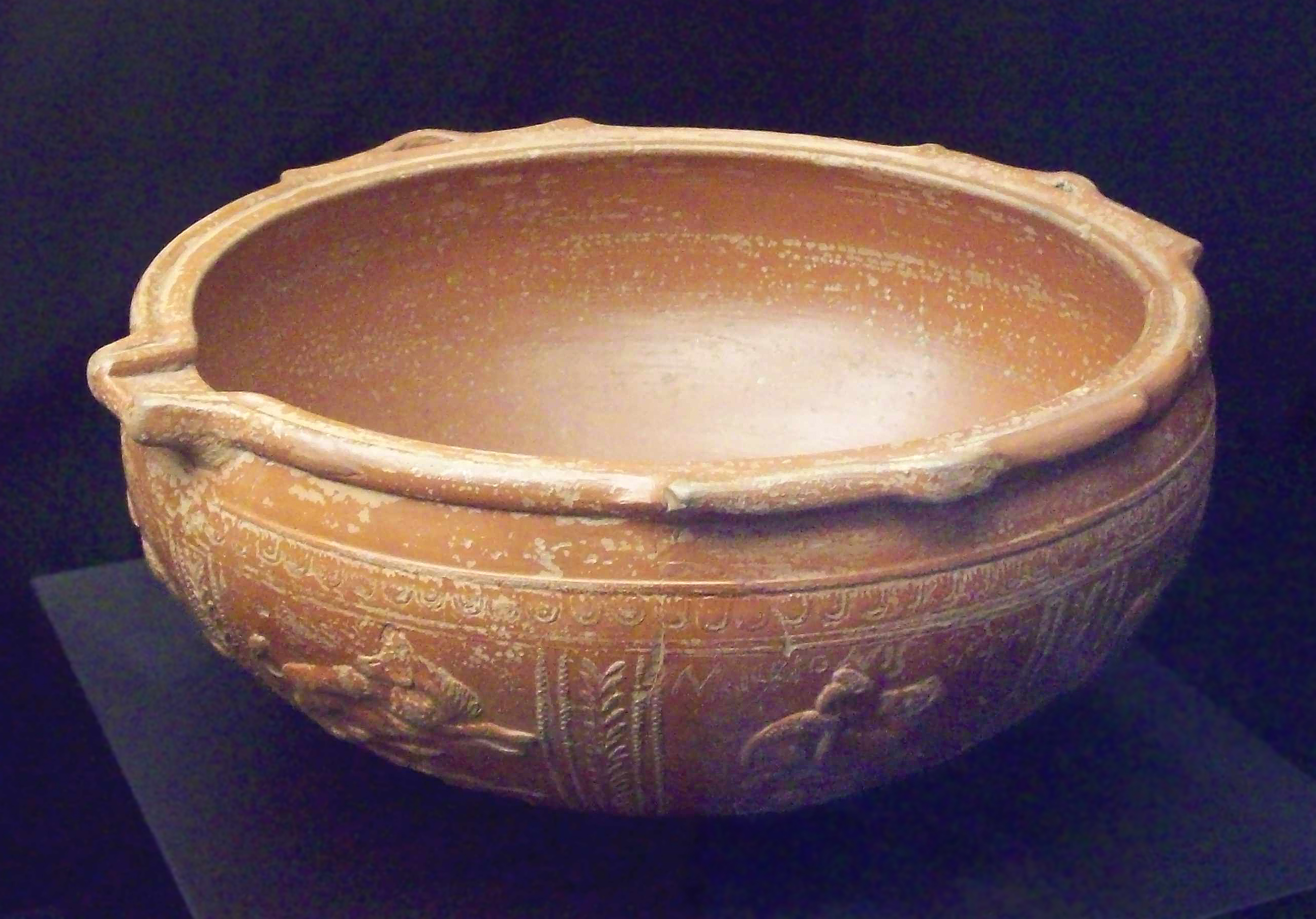
Roman bowl from Castulo, dating to the first century AD.

== History ==
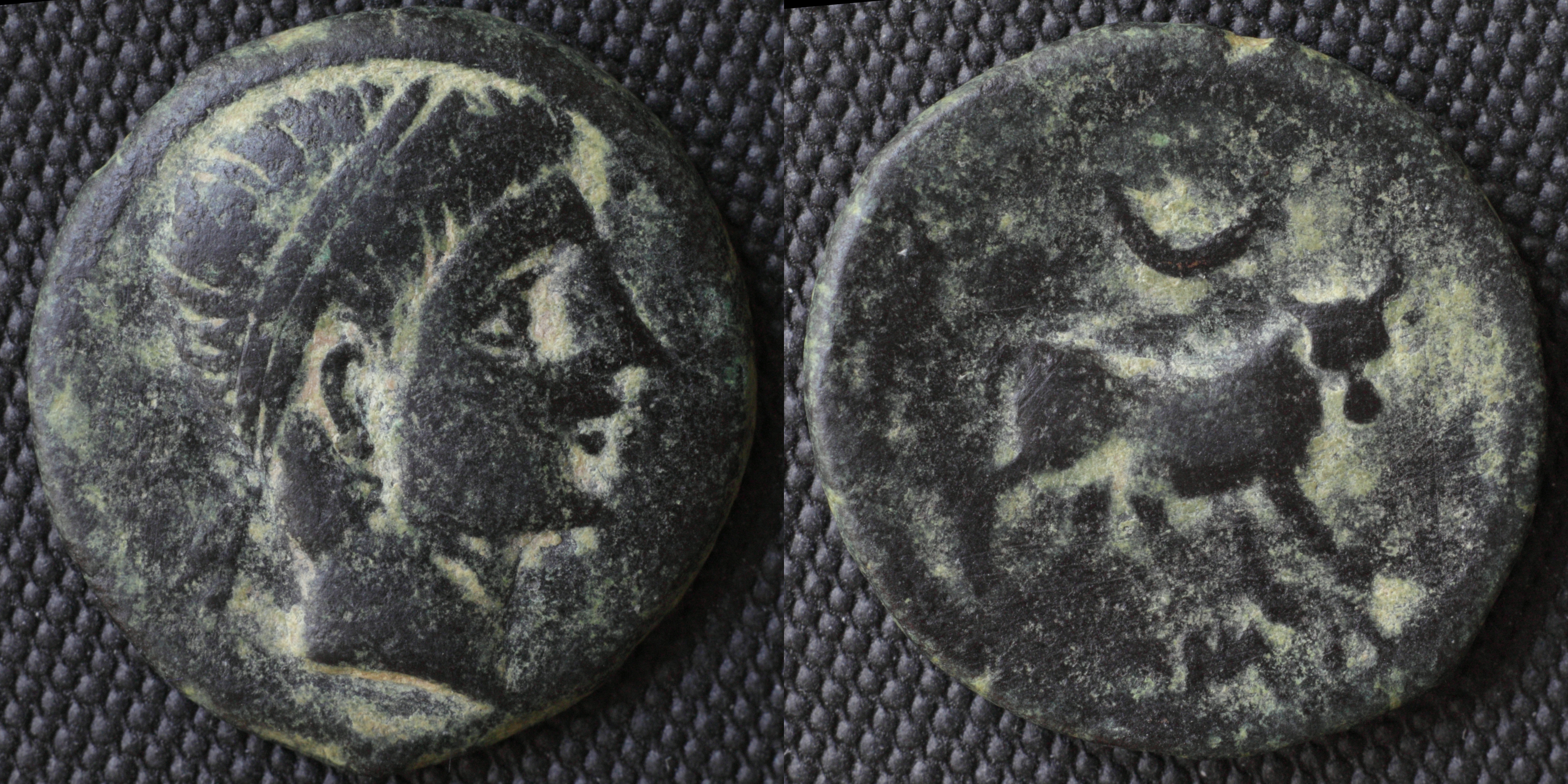

First side of the image: O: diademed head
Second side of the image: R: bull, crescent above, KAŚTILO retrograde below
bronze semis struck before 214 - 212 BC in Castulo ref.: CNH p. 331, 2-3; SNG BM Spain 1223-6

Evidence of human presence since the Neolithic period has been found there. It was the seat of the Oretani, an Iberian tribe which settled in the vicinity in the north of the Guadalquivir River beginning in the sixth century BC. According to tradition, a local princess named Himilce married Hannibal, gained the alliance of the city with the Carthaginian Empire.

It probably is the place of the ancient Castax (Ancient Greek: Κάσταξ).

In 211 BC, Castulo was the site of Hasdrubal Barca's crushing victory over the Roman army with a force of roughly 40,000 Carthaginian troops plus local Iberian mercenaries. Thereafter the Romans made a pact with the residents of city — who then betrayed the Carthaginians — and they became foederati (allied people) of Rome. According to Livy, the inhabitants of Castulo were intimidated by Scipio Africanus ordering the wholesale massacre of the inhabitants of the neighboring Illiturgis

Its medieval name was Cazlona. It lost importance even more when Andalusia fell under Islamic rule in the Middle Ages, and at the same time the nearby village of Linares grew because of its strong castle —first built as an Arab fortress, then rebuilt by the Christians after the Reconquista— overlooking the city. In 1227 the walls of Castulo were destroyed, and the town was depopulated shortly afterwards.

== Ecclesiastical history ==
A Bishopric of Castulo was established around 350 AD on territory split from the Andalusian diocese of Tucci (now also a titular see). Information about Christian bishops of Castulo appears in the first half of the fourth century AD through participation by its bishops in the Council of Elvira and that of Sardica. It may have been reabsorbed by Tucci.

The diocese reappears two centuries later, when in 589 a bishop of Castulo, which by then was under Visigoth rule and a suffragan of the Metropolitan of Toledo, took part in the third Council of Toledo. Other bishops of Castulo were at later Visigoth councils down to the tenth Council of Toledo in 656. Thereafter, Castulo is replaced as bishopric by the Diocese of Baeza,

A late-antique building at Cástulo, once interpreted as a church, has been proposed as a possible synagogue. Researchers cited its square plan, which could have accommodated a central bimah for Torah reading, a fragment of an oil lamp bearing what may be a menorah, and the absence of clearly Christian artifacts nearby.

=== Titular see ===
No longer a residential bishopric, Castulo is listed by the Catholic Church as a Latin titular see.

It was nominally restored in 1969 and since has had the following incumbents, so far of the fitting episcopal (lowest) rank with an archiepiscopal exception:

- Titular Archbishop Angel Maria Ocampo Berrio, Jesuits (S.J.) (1970.02.20 – resigned 1973.03.10) as emeritate, died 1991; previously Titular Bishop of Cynopolis in Arcadia (1942.06.23 – 1947.07.19) as Coadjutor Bishop of Socorro y San Gil (Colombia) (1942.06.23 – 1947.07.19), succeeding as Bishop of Socorro y San Gil (1947.07.19 – 1950.12.06), then last Suffragan Bishop of Tunja (Colombia) (1950.12.06 – 1964.06.20), promoted first Metropolitan Archbishop of Tunja (1964.06.20 – retired 1970.02.20)
- Enrico Bartolucci Panaroni, Comboni Missionaries (M.C.C.J.) (1973.06.14 – death 1995.02.10) as Apostolic Vicar of Esmeraldas (Ecuador) (1973.06.14 – 1995.02.10)
- Riccardo Ruotolo (1995.12.06 – death 2012.08.01) as Auxiliary Bishop of Manfredonia–Vieste–San Giovanni Rotondo (Italy) (1995.12.06 – retired 2004.02.28) and on emeritate
- Adelio Dell’Oro (2012.12.07 – 2015.01.31) as last Apostolic Administrator of Apostolic Administration of Atyrau (Kazakhstan) (2012.12.07 – 2015.05.16), next promoted first Bishop of Karaganda (Kazakhstan) (2015.01.31 – ...)
- Víctor Alejandro Aguilar Ledesma (2015.12.01 – ...), Auxiliary Bishop of Morelia (Mexico).

== See also ==
- List of Catholic dioceses in Spain, Andorra, Ceuta and Gibraltar

== Sources and external links ==
- A Brief History of Spain - Carthage and Rome, on PracticalSpain.com
- "CÁSTULO (Cazlona) Jaén, Spain." In The Princeton Encyclopedia of Classical Sites edited by R. Stillwell et al. 1976.
- GCatholic, with titular incumbent biography links
