= Battle of Petelia =

Battle of the 2nd Punic War, in 208 BC

- Part of the Second Punic War
Date	Summer 208 BC
Location	Petelia, Bruttium
Result	Carthaginian victory

Belligerents
Carthage	Rome

Commanders and leaders
Hannibal	Unknown

Strength
5,000 3,000 infantry 2,000 cavalry	3,500+

Casualties and losses
Unknown	3,500 Casualties 2,000 killed 1,500 captured

The Battle of Petelia was an ambush during the Second Punic War that took place in the summer of 208 BC near Petelia. The Carthaginian general Hannibal surprised and destroyed a large Roman detachment.

== Prelude ==
In the summer of 208 BC, the Roman consuls Marcus Claudius Marcellus and Titus Quinctius Crispinus ordered a part of the Roman garrison of Tarentum to move up and assist in an offensive against the Carthaginian-allied town of Locri. Hannibal received word from the people of Thurii of the Roman move and laid an ambush along the road from Tarentum with 3,000 infantry and 2,000 cavalry.

== Battle ==
The Carthaginian force was hidden at the foot of the hill of Petelia. The Romans failed to conduct a reconnaissance and the Carthaginians achieved complete surprise. They killed 2,000 Romans and captured 1,500. The rest of the Roman force fled cross-country back to Tarentum.

== Bibliography ==
- Livius, Titus (2006). Hannibal's War: Books Twenty-One to Thirty. Translated by J.C. Yardley, introduction and notes by Dexter Hoyos. Oxford: Oxford University Press. ISBN 0-19-283159-3.
