= Sarno (disambiguation) =

Sarno is a town and comune of Campania, Italy.

Sarno may also refer to:

- Sarno (surname), Italian surname
- Sarno (river), Italy
- Sarno Cathedral, a Roman Catholic Cathedral in the town of Sarno, Italy

== See also ==
- Battle of the Sarno, 1460
