= Torre Annunziata =

Torre Annunziata Torre Nunziata (Neapolitan)
- Comune
- Comune di Torre Annunziata
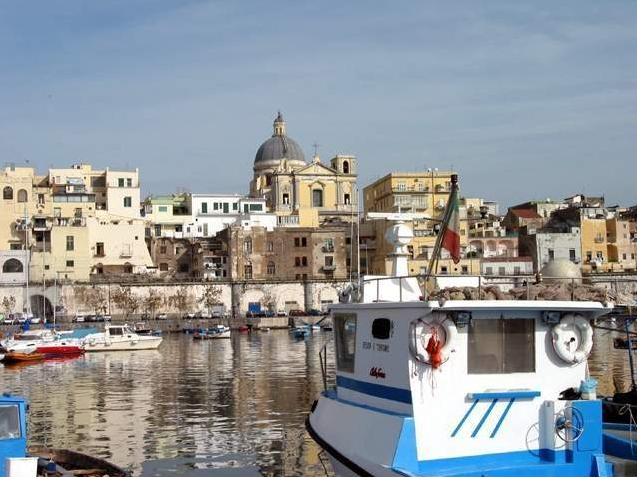
- Panorama of Torre Annunziata

- Coat of arms

- Location within Italy Location within Campania
- Coordinates: 40°45′N 14°27′E
- Country: Italy
- Region: Campania
- Metropolitan city: Naples (NA)
- Frazioni: Rovigliano

Government
  - Mayor: Corrado Cuccurullo (Democratic Party)

Area
  - Total: 7.33 km^{2} (2.83 sq mi)
- Elevation: 9 m (30 ft)

Population (1 January 2025)
  - Total: 39,719
  - Density: 5,420/km^{2} (14,000/sq mi)
- Demonym: Torresi or Oplontini (rare)
- Time zone: UTC+1 (CET)
  - Summer (DST): UTC+2 (CEST)
- Postal code: 80058
- Dialing code: 081
- Patron saint: Madonna of the Snow
- Saint day: 22 October and 5 August
- Website: Official website

UNESCO World Heritage Site
- Official name: Torre Annunziata; Villa A; Villa B
- Part of: Archaeological Areas of Pompei, Herculaneum and Torre Annunziata
- Criteria: Cultural: (iii)(iv)(v)
- Reference: 829
- Inscription: 1997 (21st Session)
- Area: 1.7 ha (4.2 acres)
- Buffer zone: 2.63 ha (6.5 acres)

Torre Annunziata (Italian: [ˈtorre annunˈtsjaːta]; Neapolitan: Torre Nunziata) is a comune (municipality) in the Metropolitan City of Naples, in the Italian region of Campania. It is located on the Gulf of Naples, at the foot of Mount Vesuvius.

The municipality lies on the innermost part of the Gulf of Naples, in a narrow coastal strip between Vesuvius and the Tyrrhenian Sea. It is included in the Vesuvius "red zone", the area planned for preventive evacuation in the event of renewed volcanic activity. To the south, the municipal territory reaches the mouth of the Sarno River, within the area of the Sarno River Regional Park.

The town stands above the remains of ancient Oplontis, a Roman settlement buried by the eruption of Vesuvius in AD 79. The archaeological area of Oplontis, in Torre Annunziata, forms part of the UNESCO World Heritage Site "Archaeological Areas of Pompeii, Herculaneum and Torre Annunziata", inscribed in 1997.

== Toponymy ==
The name Torre Annunziata is connected with a chapel dedicated to the Annunciation which, according to local historical tradition, was founded in 1319 together with a hospice. A defensive tower was later built to protect the church and the surrounding lands, giving rise to the settlement's name.

The medieval form Turris Annunciatae di Scafati is recorded in relation to the growth of the settlement around the old chapel and watchtower.

== History ==
The city was destroyed in the Vesuvius eruption of 79 AD and in 1631. The city was once the seat of important ironwork (Deriver, Dalmine), food processing and pasta industries. Today industries still active include naval, armament and pharmaceutical ones.

The archaeological site of Oplonti is a UNESCO World Heritage Site since 1997.

In antiquity the locality was marked on the Tabula Peutingeriana with the symbol used for thermal sites and was known as Oplonti. Greek settlers and later Etruscans were present in the area from the 8th century BC; towards the end of the 5th century BC, Campania came under Samnite control before the Roman conquest in 89 BC.

After the eruption of AD 79, the area entered a long period of decline and was later known as Silva Mala. In 1319, Charles, Duke of Calabria granted land at Aversa to Guglielmo di Nocera, Puccio Franconi di Napoli, Andrea Perrucci di Scafati and Matteo di Avitaya; they founded a church dedicated to the Virgin of the Annunciation, a small monastery and a hospice at a place called La Calcarola.

The eruption of 1631 again devastated the area, but reconstruction began soon afterwards. Under Charles of Bourbon, industrial development was encouraged by the foundation in 1758 of the Royal Arms Factory, later linked to the Stabilimento militare Spolette.

The town was called Gioacchinopoli between 1810 and 1815, during the rule of Joachim Murat in Naples. In the Bourbon restoration period the railway from Portici was extended to Torre Annunziata and later towards Calabria. The port works were completed in 1871, supporting trade based on the import of grain and coal and the export of pasta.

In 1928 the municipality of Pompei was created, and Torre Annunziata ceded territory including La Civita di Valle and Pontenuovo. Further administrative changes in 1946 reduced the territory of the former larger municipality.

In the late 20th century, the town was also associated with episodes of organized crime. On 26 August 1984, eight people were killed in Torre Annunziata in a massacre linked to the Camorra. The journalist Giancarlo Siani, who investigated links between local clans, was murdered in Naples in 1985.

== Symbols ==
The municipal statute uses the official Italian title Città di Torre Annunziata, granted by royal decree on 10 September 1936 and entered in the records of the heraldic authorities on 24 August 1938.

The municipal coat of arms was described by decree of the head of government on 28 January 1938: on an azure field, a natural castle, opened in black, with Guelph merlons and flanked by two towers, with a silver star above. The municipal banner was granted by royal decree of 11 January 1940.

== Geography ==
Torre Annunziata borders with the municipalities of Boscoreale, Boscotrecase, Castellammare di Stabia, Pompei, Torre del Greco and Trecase. Trains from Torre Annunziata Centrale rail station operate to Naples and Pompei.

The General Catalogue of Italian Cultural Heritage describes the historic centre of Torre Annunziata as an old coastal town on the southern slopes of Vesuvius, facing the low coast of the Gulf of Naples. The same record describes the municipal territory as flat and notes the historical combination of agriculture, fishing, industry, trade, thermal activity and seaside tourism.

== Economy ==
The economy of Torre Annunziata was historically linked to fishing, maritime trade, industry and pasta production. The pasta tradition gave the town a strong identity within the so-called arte bianca, an Italian expression referring to activities connected with flour, bread and pasta.

Among the brands associated with this tradition is Voiello, founded in 1879 as a shop in Torre Annunziata and acquired by Barilla in 1973. The town also preserves artisan pasta producers such as Setaro, linked to the traditional production of dried pasta.

Pastificio F.lli Setaro describes itself as an artisan pasta factory active since 1939. According to the company's history, Nunziato Setaro acquired a 19th-century volcanic-stone building in that year in order to preserve artisan pasta production in Torre Annunziata. The firm describes its production as based on semolina from durum wheat, water, bronze drawing and slow low-temperature drying.

The port of Torre Annunziata retains a commercial and industrial function. It is currently linked to the logistics of cereals, flours, food commodities and general or break-bulk cargo.

Another important element of local industrial history is the former Stabilimento militare Spolette, heir to the Royal Arms Factory founded in 1758 by Charles of Bourbon. The Italian Ministry of Culture describes it as a large industrial complex of about 80,000 m^{2} (860,000 sq ft) that was one of the main factories for bladed weapons and firearms in the Kingdom of the Two Sicilies.

== Main sights ==
On the Tabula Peutingeriana, Torre Annunziata is called Oplonti.

In the communal territory, one of the richest Roman villas has been excavated. Dating to the 1st century BC, it probably belonged to the gens Poppaea, and is known as Villa Poppaea.

The archaeological area of Oplontis preserves important remains of Roman suburban buildings buried by the eruption of Vesuvius in AD 79. The Archaeological Park of Pompeii describes Oplontis as one of the most significant monumental testimonies of the Pompeian suburbs.

Villa Poppaea is noted for its wall paintings, gardens, private baths and a large swimming pool measuring 61 by 17 m (200 by 56 ft), added during the expansion of the complex in the 1st century AD.

The site also includes the so-called Villa B, or Villa of Lucius Crassius Tertius, near Villa Poppaea. Unlike the latter, Villa B had a more economic and commercial function, with spaces used for storage and the distribution of goods.

UNESCO includes the villas of Torre Annunziata in the World Heritage Site "Archaeological Areas of Pompeii, Herculaneum and Torre Annunziata". According to UNESCO, the villas of Torre Annunziata preserve some of the best surviving wall paintings of the Roman period.

Beyond Oplontis, the town preserves places linked to its industrial and port history, including the former Stabilimento militare Spolette and the historic port area.

Among the non-archaeological historic buildings is the Basilica Ave Gratia Plena, sanctuary of Maria Santissima della Neve. The Italian General Catalogue of Cultural Heritage traces its origin to the old chapel at La Calcarola; the church was declared a Marian sanctuary in 1954 and received the title of minor basilica on 21 July 1979.

Another notable building is Palazzo Criscuolo, the historic seat of the municipality. The municipal administration describes it as an 18th-century palace associated with the Criscuolo family, later used for municipal offices and now also for cultural and public events.

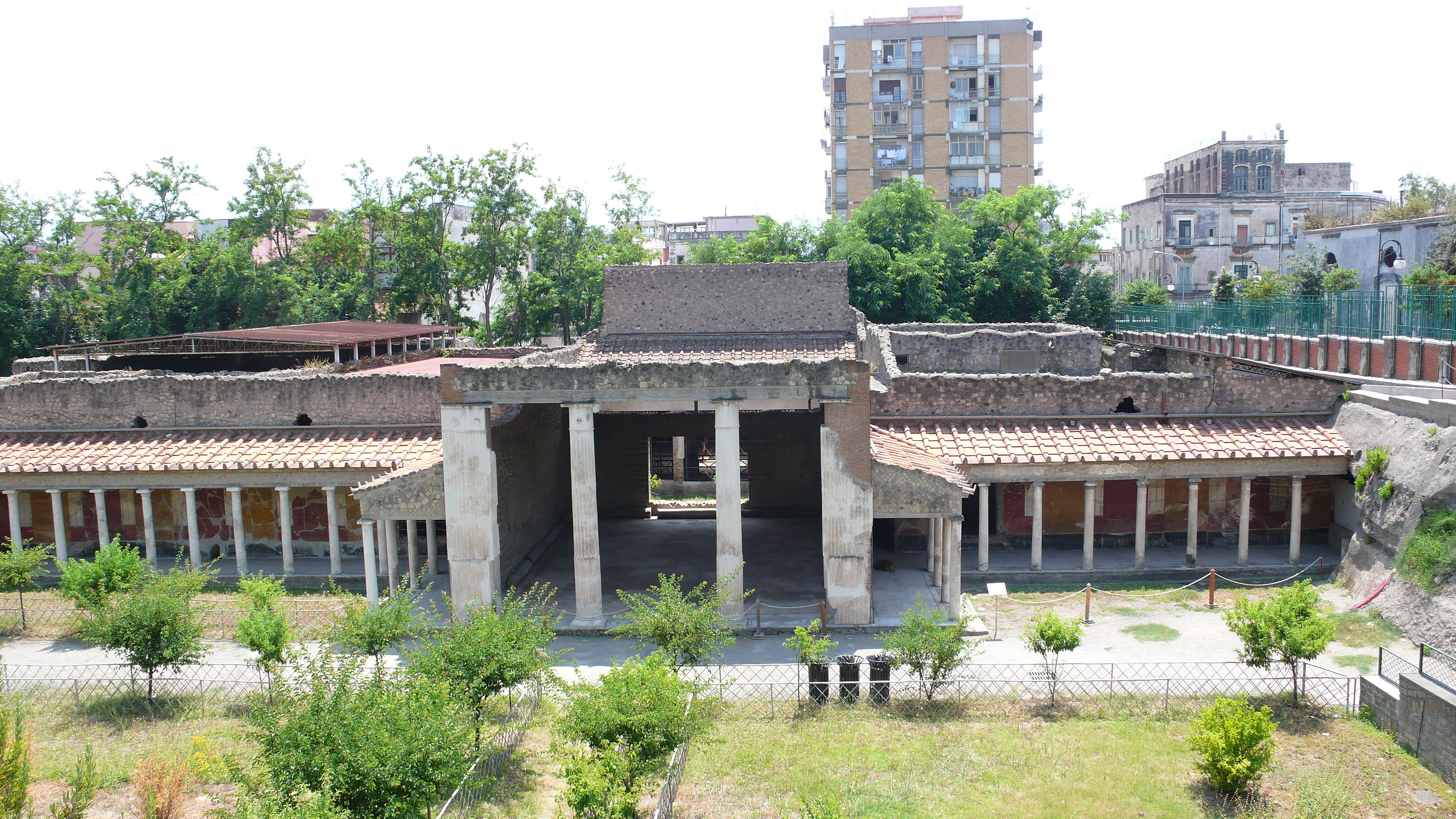
Archaeological areas of Pompeii, Herculaneum and Torre Annunziata.

== Transport ==
Torre Annunziata is served by road links along the Vesuvian coastal corridor, including the A3 Naples-Salerno motorway.

The town has rail connections through Torre Annunziata Centrale railway station, part of the Rete Ferroviaria Italiana network. The Torre Annunziata-Oplonti station, managed by Ente Autonomo Volturno, is part of the Vesuvian lines of the Circumvesuviana network.

The port of Torre Annunziata, on the Gulf of Naples, continues to handle cereals, flour and general goods, reflecting its historical connection with the town's food and industrial economy.

== Culture and traditions ==
=== Madonna of the Snow ===
Devotion to the Madonna of the Snow is linked to a local tradition according to which a Marian image was found on 5 August 1354 by fishermen from Torre Annunziata in the waters near the Scoglio di Rovigliano. The image is preserved in the town's basilica.

According to the Italian General Catalogue of Cultural Heritage, the old Marian image long remained hidden by a painted cloth, was rediscovered and restored in 1872, and was crowned by decree of the Vatican Chapter on 22 October 1922. The same source notes that the image has been invoked in local tradition during Saracen raids, famines and eruptions of Vesuvius.

The celebration on 5 August includes a historical re-enactment of the finding of the image at sea, a procession from the basilica to the port, and a maritime procession with a copy of the icon. The town also commemorates 22 October as a votive feast connected with the protection traditionally attributed to the Virgin during the 1822 eruption of Vesuvius.

The municipality also recognizes a fair called Festa della Madonna della Neve, normally held around 5 August and 22 October.

== Sport ==
Torre Annunziata is home to Savoia 1908, a football club based in the town. In the 2025–26 season, the Lega Nazionale Dilettanti listed Savoia in Serie D Group I, the fourth level of Italian football.

Savoia plays its home matches at the Stadio Alfredo Giraud, a municipal stadium in Piazzale Gargiulo. The stadium website describes the ground as owned by the Comune di Torre Annunziata, with a capacity of about 10,000 spectators, a 112 by 70 m (367 by 230 ft) pitch and an artificial surface installed during renovation works in 2010. The ground was inaugurated as the municipal stadium on 25 January 1962 and was renamed in June 1981 after Alfredo Giraud, a former Savoia captain and vice-president of the club's 1924 Italian championship runner-up side.

The club's most notable historical result came in the 1923–24 season, when Savoia reached the national championship final and finished runner-up to Genoa.

Professional footballer Ciro Immobile was born in Torre Annunziata on 20 February 1990. The Italian Football Federation notes that he made his Serie A debut with Juventus in 2009, later played for several Italian and foreign clubs, and became a regular Italy international during the 2010s.

The town is also associated with boxing through Irma Testa, born in Torre Annunziata in 1997. Olympedia lists her as an Italian Olympic and Youth Olympic boxer, with a silver medal at the 2014 Summer Youth Olympics and a bronze medal in the women's featherweight event at the 2020 Summer Olympics. The Italian National Olympic Committee described Testa's Tokyo 2020 bronze as the first Olympic medal won by an Italian woman in boxing. Treccani also records Testa's European featherweight title in 2019 and her world title in New Delhi in 2023.

Boxing has a local institutional base in Boxe Vesuviana. The magazine of the Italian Boxing Federation reported that the club was founded in 1960 and has been affiliated with the federation continuously since 1964; the same source described a 2024 mural at the gym depicting Torre Annunziata boxers who had competed at the Olympic Games: Ernesto Bergamasco, Pietro Aurino, Alfonso Pinto and Irma Testa.

Other team sports are also represented locally. The Naples committee of the Italian Volleyball Federation lists ASD Vesuvio Oplonti Volley as a Torre Annunziata club; for the 2025–26 season it recorded a men's team in Serie C and a women's team in Serie D. Basketball is represented by Basketorre 2009; the Campania committee of the Italian Basketball Federation listed Basketorre 2009 in its 2025–26 Under-19 men's Gold calendar, with home fixtures at IISS Marconi in Torre Annunziata.

Given the town's coastal position, nautical sports are also present. The Lega Navale Italiana has a Torre Annunziata delegation based at the western pier area of the port and lists sailing courses among its activities.

== Notable people ==
- Dino De Laurentiis, film producer
- Alberto Nocerino, footballer
- Alfredo Donnarumma, footballer
- Ciro Immobile, footballer
- Irma Testa, boxer

== Sources ==
Chisholm, Hugh, ed. (1911). "Torre Annunziata" . Encyclopædia Britannica. Vol. 27 (11th ed.). Cambridge University Press.
