= Sarno (surname) =

Sarno is an Italian surname. Notable people with the name include:

- Derek Sarno, American chef
- Devin Sarno (born 1966), American musician
- Domenic Sarno (born 1963), American politician
- Geraldo Sarno (1938–2022), Brazilian documentarist, screenwriter, and film director
- Hector Sarno (1880–1953), American film director
- Jacopo Sarno (born 1989), Italian actor and singer
- Jay Sarno (1922–1984), American businessman
- John E. Sarno (1923–2017), American medical writer and physician
- Joseph W. Sarno (1921–2010), American film director and screenwriter
- Kelly Norris Sarno (born 1966), Canadian American business person
- Louis Sarno (1954–2017), American non-fiction writer and musicologist
- Michael Sarno (born 1958), American mobster
- Moody Sarno (1914–1997), American football player and coach
- Peter Sarno (born 1979), Canadian ice hockey player
- Peter H. Sarno (born 1954), American writer
- Vanessa Sarno (born 2003), Filipino weightlifter
- Vincenzo Sarno (born 1988), Italian association football player
- Sabato de Sarno (born 1980s), Italian fashion designer
- Alexandrea Owens-Sarno (born 1988), American actress

== See also ==
- Sarno (disambiguation)
