= Villa Poppaea =

Ancient Roman villa

- Villa Oplontis, Villa A
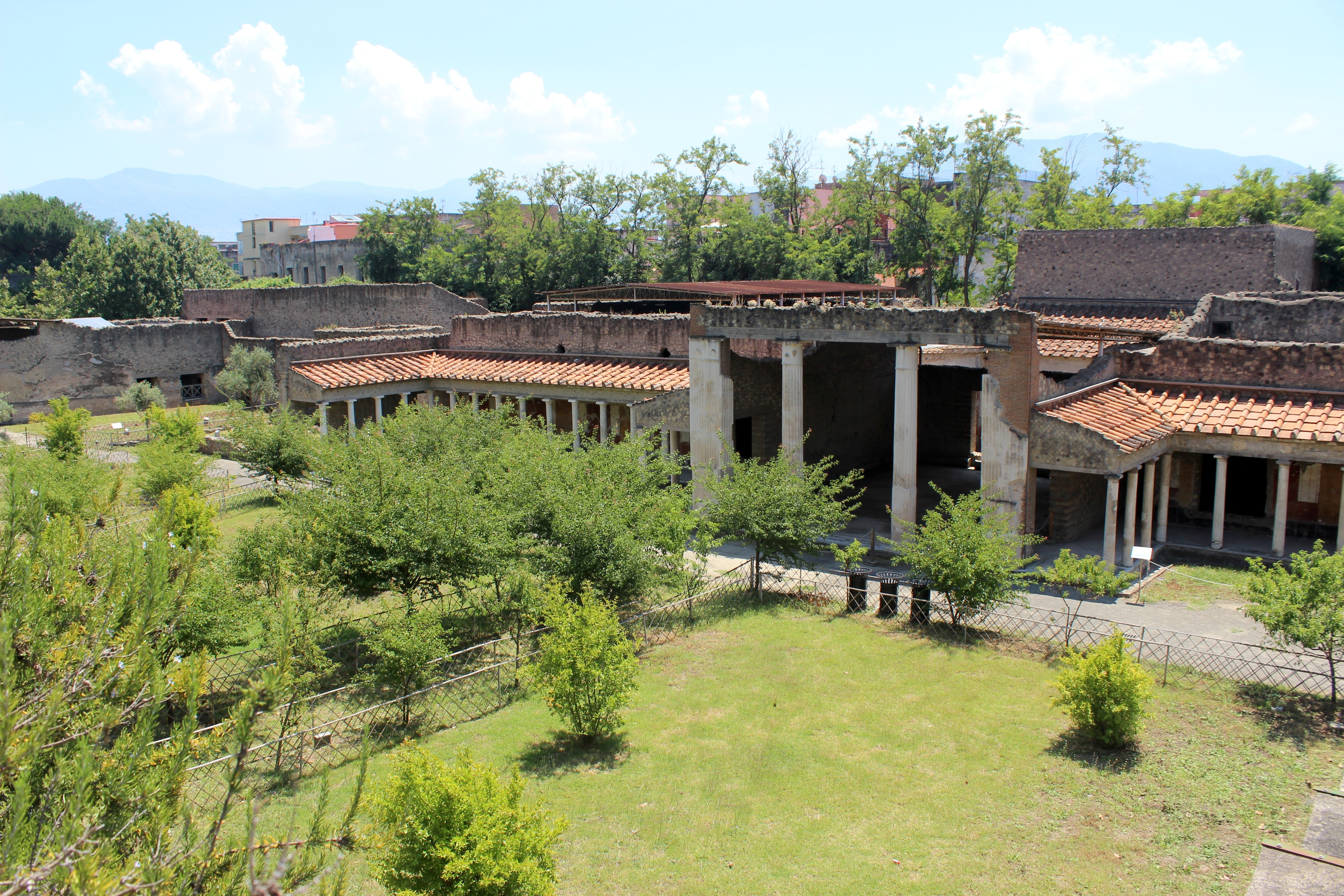
- The Villa Poppaea as seen from the garden in front
- Interactive map of Villa Poppaea
- 40°45′26″N 14°27′9″E
- Type: Roman villa
- Location: Torre Annunziata, Province of Naples, Campania, Italy
- Part of: Oplontis

Site notes
- Management: Soprintendenza Speciale per i Beni Archeologici di Napoli e Pompei
- Website: Oplontis (in Italian and English)

UNESCO World Heritage Site
- Official name: Archaeological Areas of Pompeii, Herculaneum, and Torre Annunziata
- Type: Cultural
- Criteria: iii, iv, v
- Designated: 1997 (21st session)
- Reference no.: 829-006
- Region: Europe and North America

The Villa Poppaea is an ancient luxurious Roman seaside villa (villa maritima) located in Torre Annunziata between Naples and Sorrento, in Southern Italy. It is also called the Villa Oplontis or Oplontis Villa A as it was situated in the ancient Roman town of Oplontis while Oplontis Villa B was discovered nearby in 1973.

It was buried and preserved in the eruption of Vesuvius in 79 AD, like the nearby cities of Herculaneum and Pompeii, about 10 m (33 ft) below modern ground level.

The quality of the decorations and construction suggests that it was owned by the Emperor Nero and a pottery shard bearing the name of a freedman of Poppaea Sabina, the second wife of the emperor Nero was found at the site, which suggests the villa may have been her residence when she was away from Rome and which gives it its popular name. However, due to a lack of evidence, modern scholarship has cast doubt on whether she ever owned or resided in the villa.

It was sumptuously decorated with fine works of art. Its marble columns and capitals mark it out as being especially luxurious compared with others in this region which usually had stuccoed brick columns.

Many artifacts from Oplontis are preserved in the Naples National Archaeological Museum.

== Site ==
It was one of the luxury villas built along the entire coast of the Gulf of Naples in the Roman period, such that Strabo wrote:

"The whole gulf is quilted by cities, buildings, plantations, so united to each other, that they seem to be a single metropolis."

The villa was originally built on a shelf 14m above sea level and above the sea shore, giving it a beautiful view over the Bay of Naples. It is known that other buildings lay near the shore line below, possibly baths, and at Lido Azzurro nearby the ancient coastline has been found along with traces of Roman baths that may have been public.

The limits of the villa have not yet been found as they are covered by modern buildings.

== History ==
The villa was first built in the 50s BC and then expanded in stages. The oldest part of the house centres around the atrium(1) with triclinium (public dining room) and other reception rooms. In 1-15 AD the baths in the Third-Style were added to the northwest of the atrium centred on a small peristyle with fountain.

The villa was extended to the east in the age of Claudius (r.41–54 AD) with the addition of a large swimming pool (piscina), bordered on the south and east by trees. Triclinia and peristyles with colonnaded porticoes framed formal gardens and various guest reception and service rooms. Smaller winter gardens were decorated with remarkable frescoes. The baths near the atrium were also remodeled into a group of entertainment rooms in the Fourth-Style.

Like everywhere else in the region the villa was damaged in the earthquake of AD 62 and parts of the villa were rebuilt with Third-Style frescoes of as high quality as the earlier ones. Renovation and repairs were still being made until its last moments as, for example, some of the columns were found dissembled and garden sculptures away from their proper location indicates, and tools were found on the site.

The power of the eruption and the weight of ash above made roofs and walls collapse, columns to break and be thrown sideways so that on excavation many walls were difficult to reassemble. Many frescoes were found in pieces where wall facings had collapsed during or shortly before the eruption.

== Description ==
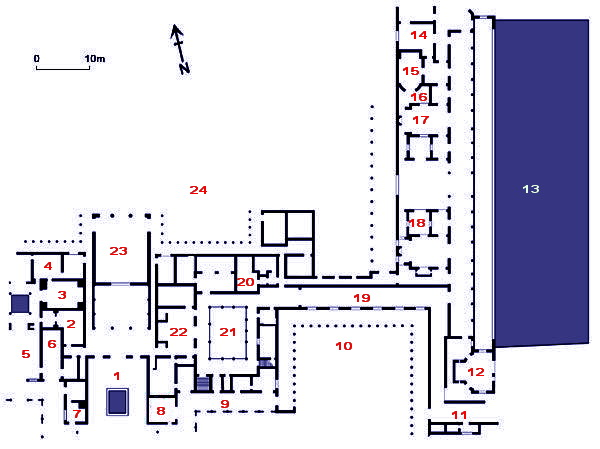
Plan of the Villa Poppaea: 1-Atrium, 3-Caldarium, 4-Tepidarium, 5-Oecus, 6-Triclinium, 7-Cubiculum, 10-Peristyle, 12-Oecus, 13-Piscina, 15-Viridarium, 20-Latrine, 21-Peristyle, 22-Lararium, 24-Garden

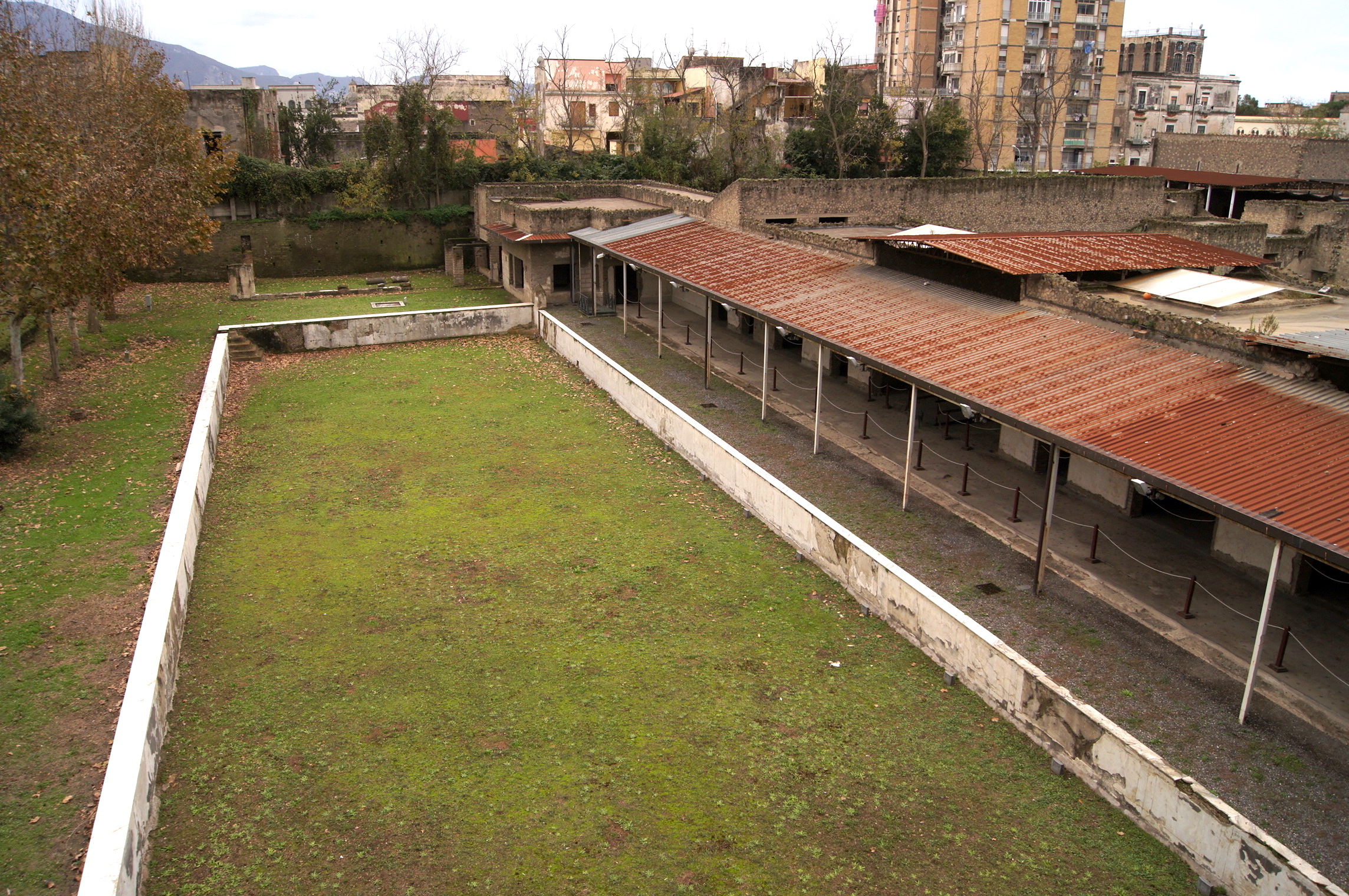
Swimming pool

The seaside villa was purportedly characterised by “rituals of reception and leisure” through both its physical space and its decoration. Over 100 rooms have been uncovered so far.

Around the peristyle (21) painted in Fourth-Style stripes was the service area with workrooms and dormitories on the upper floor for slaves, a latrine, a kitchen and a lararium. In its southwest corner a tunnel descends from this area via a series of terraces to the ancient sea shore 14 m below.

Some 40 marble sculptures were found, forming one of the most extensive collections of statues, busts and other marble ornaments known in the entire region. Among these was a group of centaurs and centauresses found in the west portico facing the north garden. Many of them also served as fountains and were intended to surround the pool but were found away from their proper position.

Mosaic floor pavements occur throughout the Villa.

== Frescoes ==
Like many of the frescoes that were preserved due to the eruption of Mount Vesuvius, those decorating the walls of the Villa Poppaea are striking both in form and in colour.

The Villa's earliest frescoes are some of the best examples of the illusionistic Second Style, while later renovations and additions are marked by high-quality paintings of the Third and Fourth Styles. The Second Style frescoes, also called the Architectural Style BC, include feigned architectural features such as trompe-l'œil windows, doors, and painted columns. The Second Style paintings in the Villa Poppaea date to around 60-50 BC, and are found in five of the villa's rooms. These have been identified as from the "Boscoreale workshop", artists working in and around the Bay of Naples around 50 BC, through pigment analysis and stylistic comparisons.

Much attention has been paid to the allusions to stage painting (scenae frons) in the Villa Poppaea frescoes, particularly those in Room 23.

=== Atrium (1) ===
The atrium is the largest room in the Villa, with higher walls and bigger frescoes than other surrounding rooms. It and the triclinium share similar complex perspective systems, with paintings depicting two layers of depth: a set of columns in the front, and an enclosed landscape behind. The east and west walls of the atrium are symmetrical, and the paintings contain wood inlay and silver decorative elements. Also on the wall were niches, racks, and ledges for displaying objects, suggesting the hall was dedicated to a prince.

Passageways south of the atrium are decorated with painted landscapes containing hills, rivers, shepherds, and fishermen.

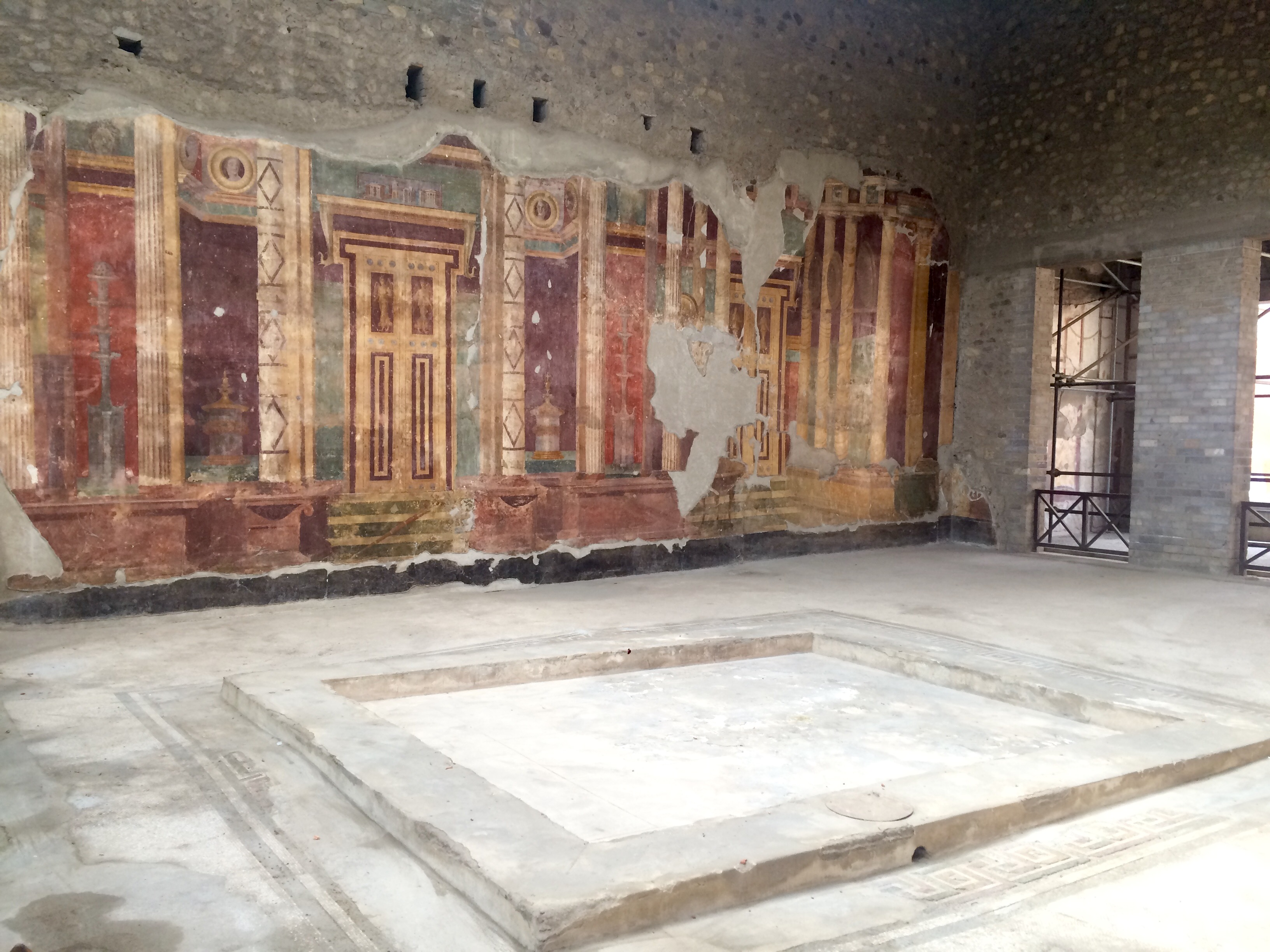

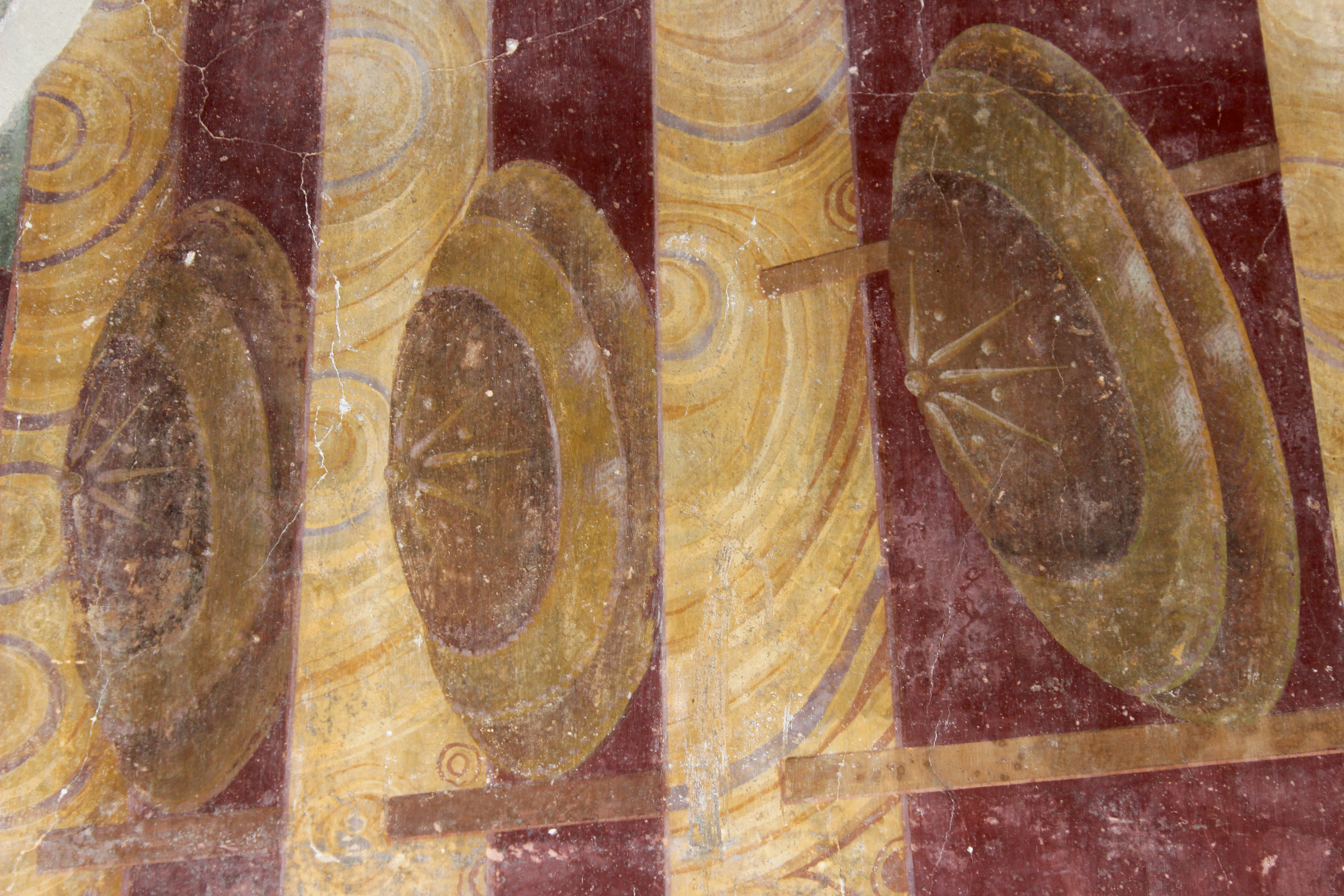

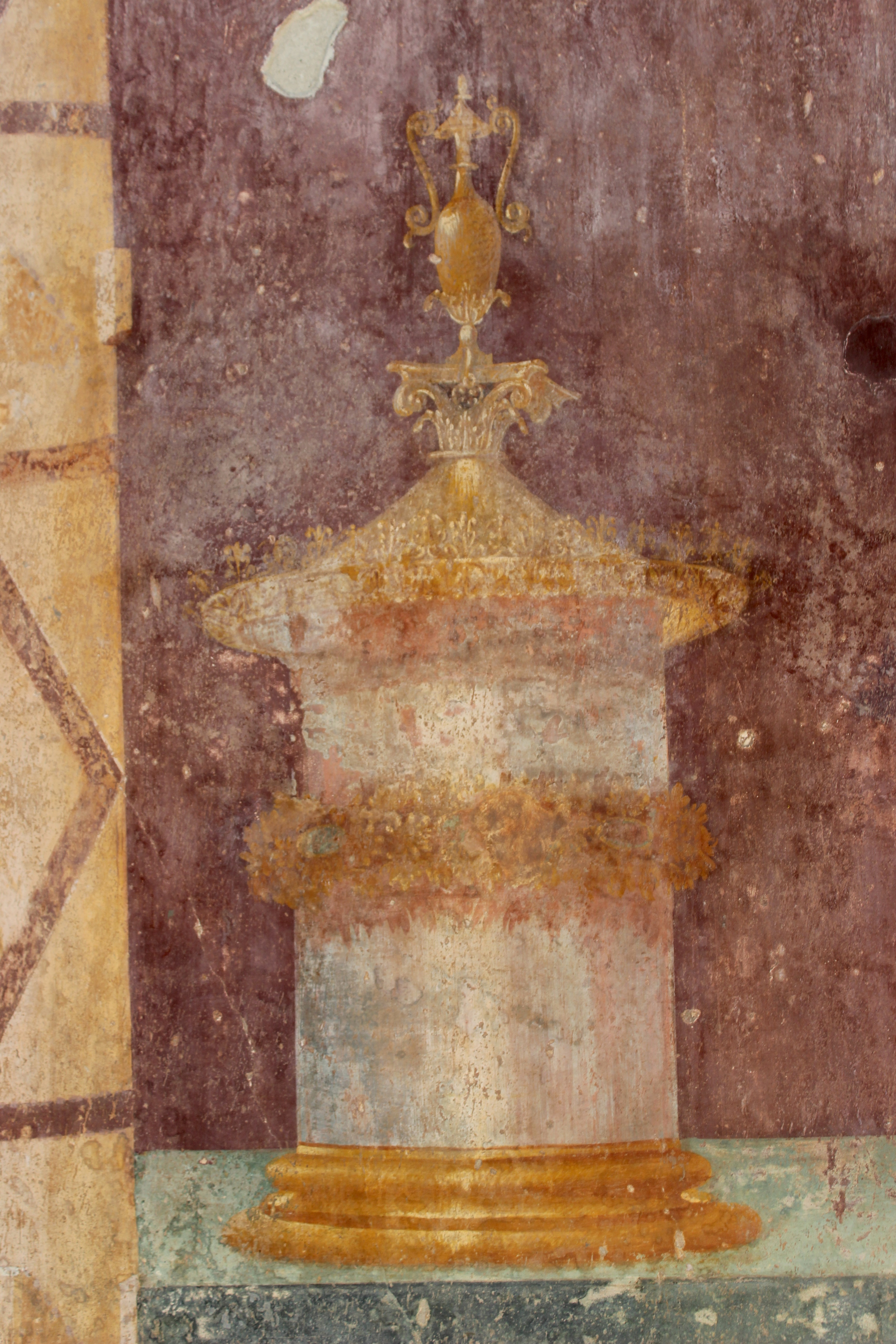

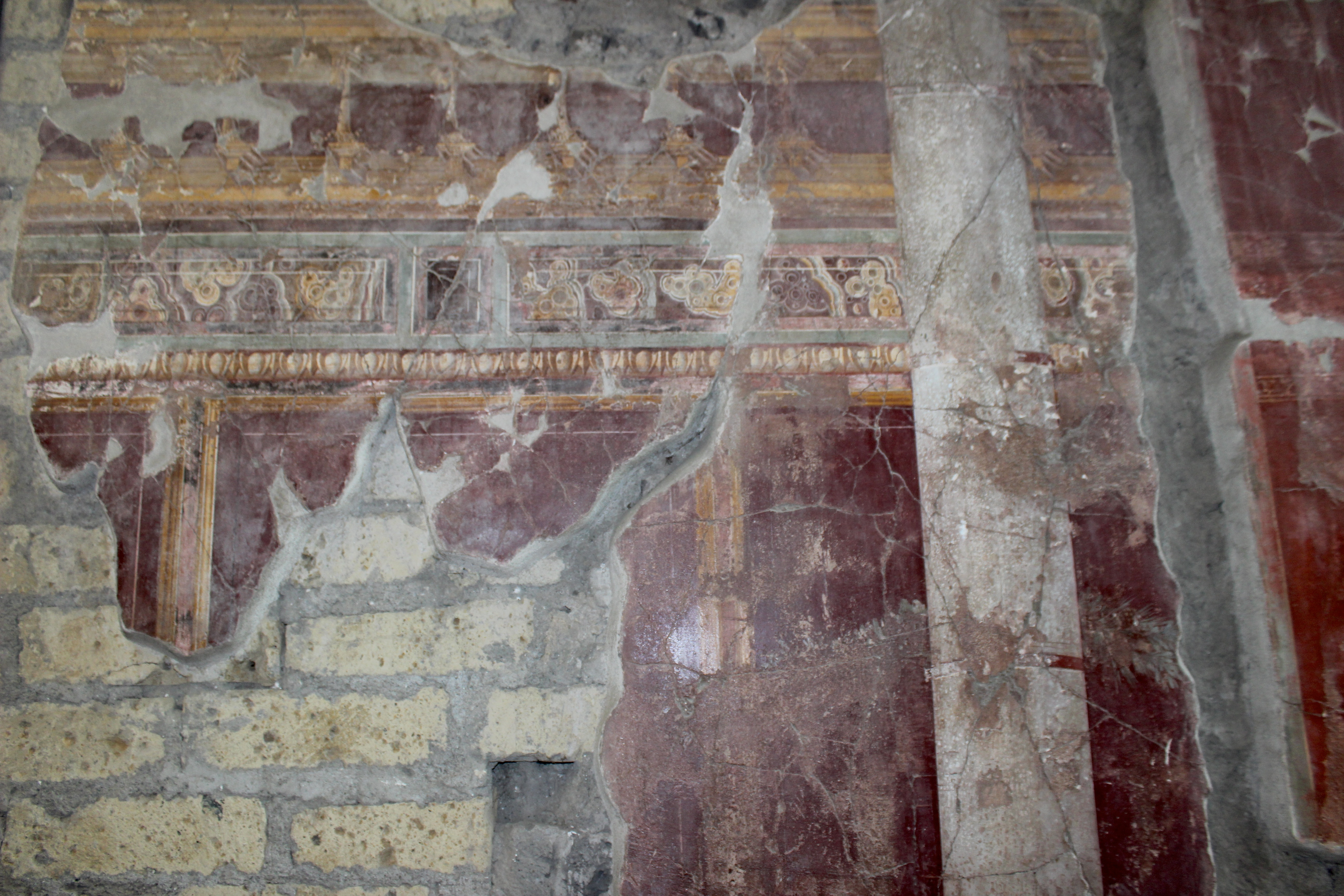

=== Triclinium (6) ===
Third Style and Fourth Style restoration work appears in multiple rooms that were originally painted in the Second Style. Structural damage in the triclinium necessitated repainting, and the artist repairing it worked in the Third Style. The room north of the cubiculum was restored in same manner.

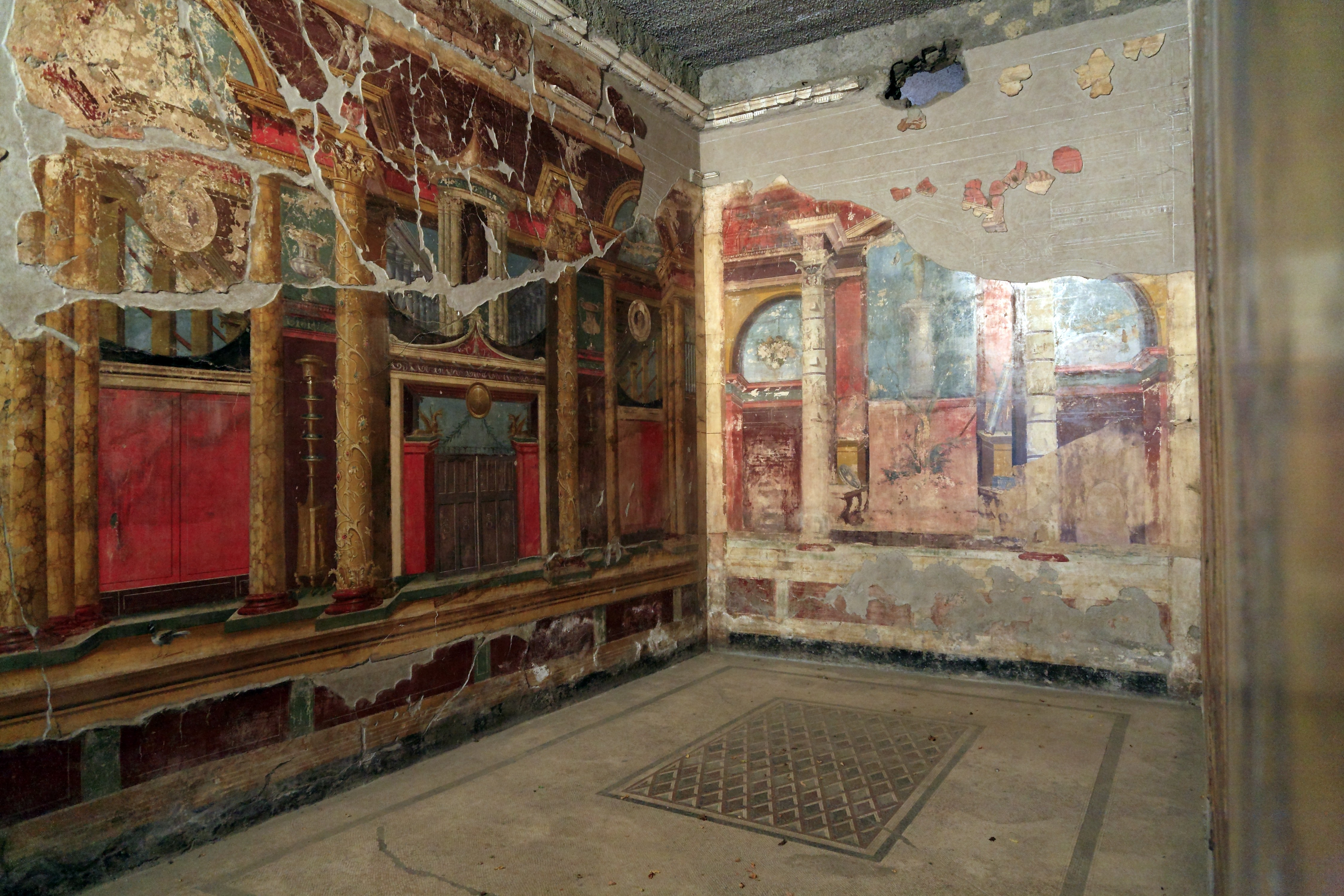

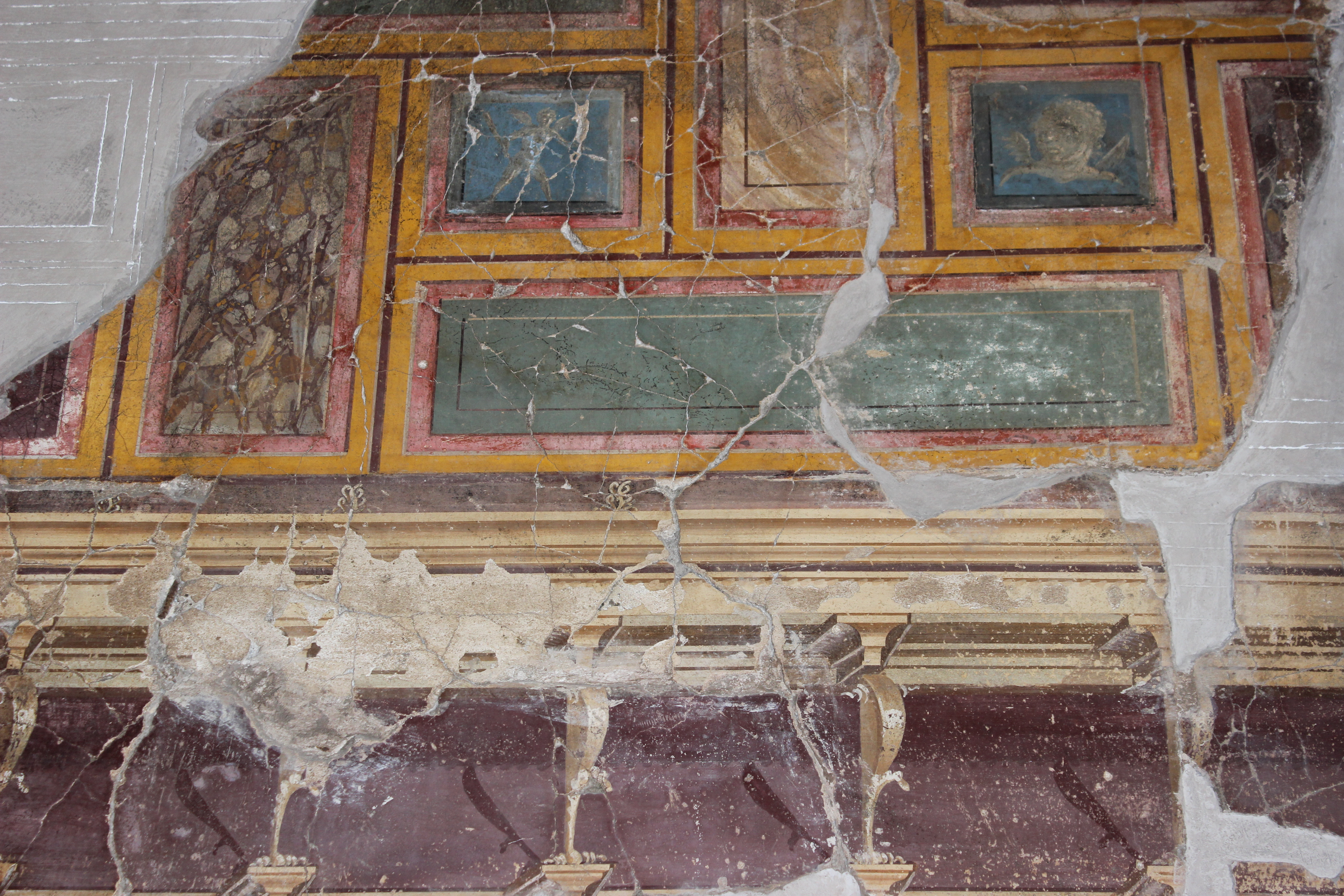

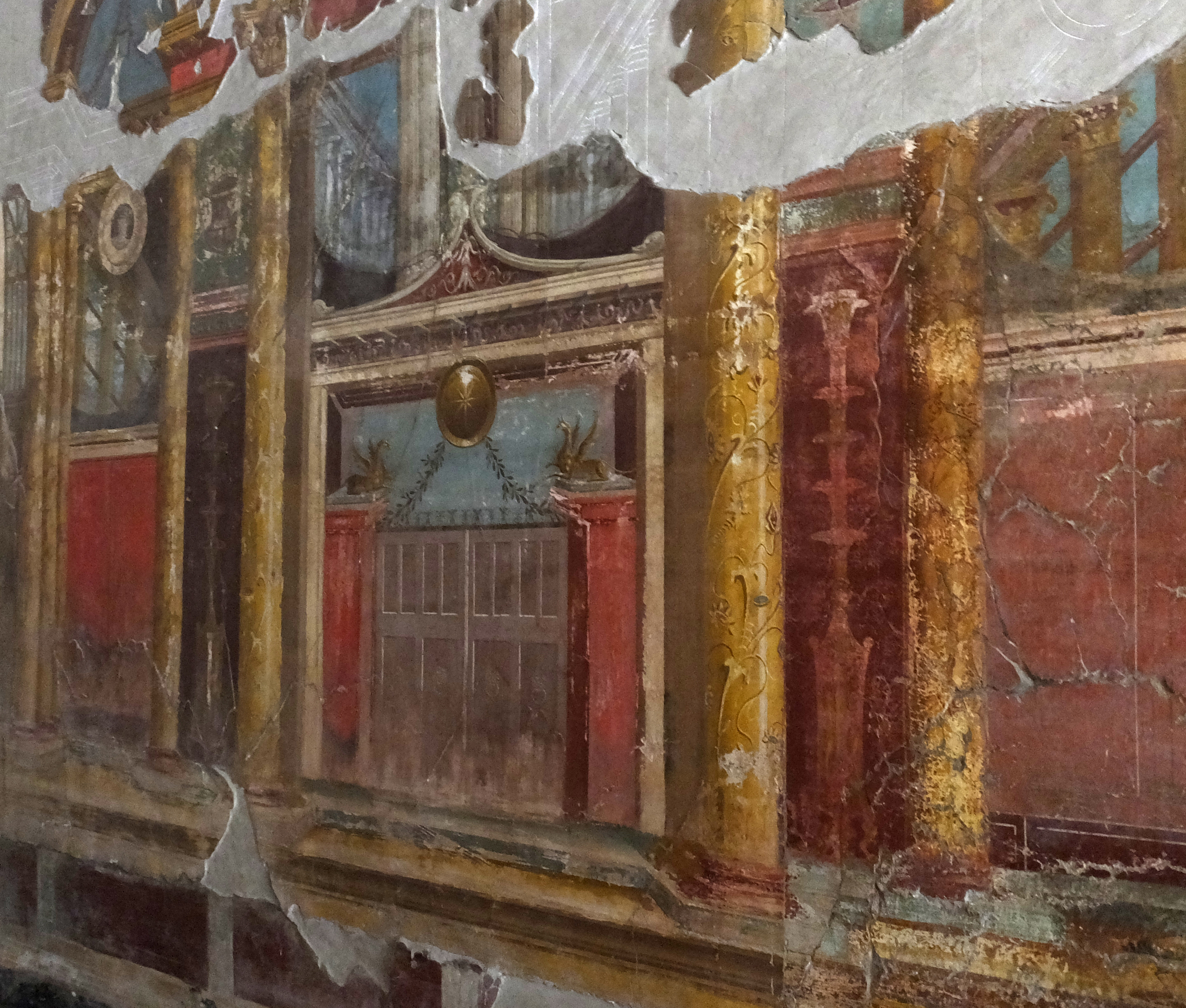

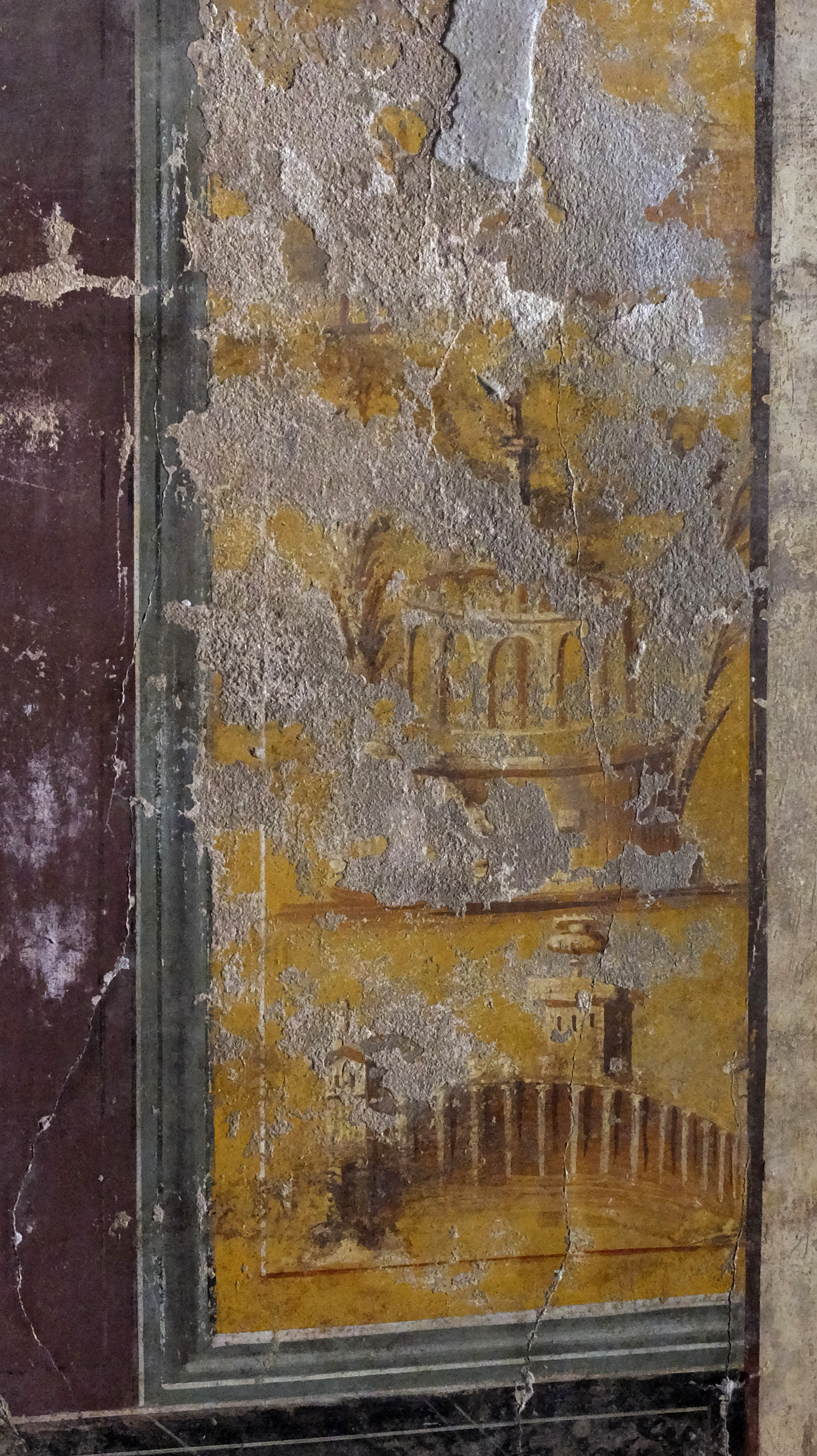

=== Oecus (5) ===
Immediately to the west of the triclinium is a large oecus, known as the "Peacock Hall" from its remarkable fresco, which was the main living room of a Roman house. The room is painted in the Second Style. The surviving east wall depicts a central archway leading to a landscape and includes details such as a theatre mask and peacock, with columns and architectural elements framing the scenes.

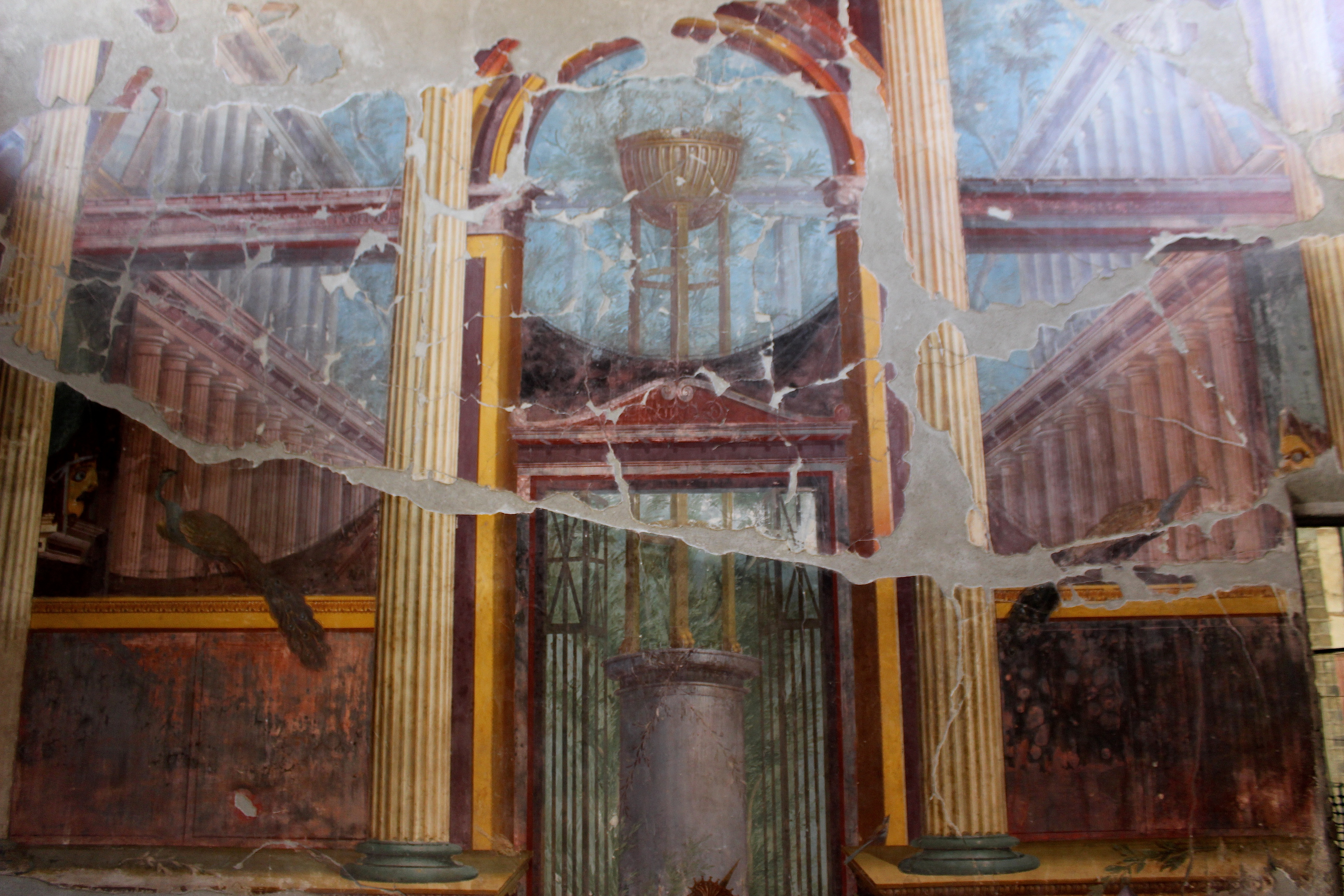
Oecus east wall

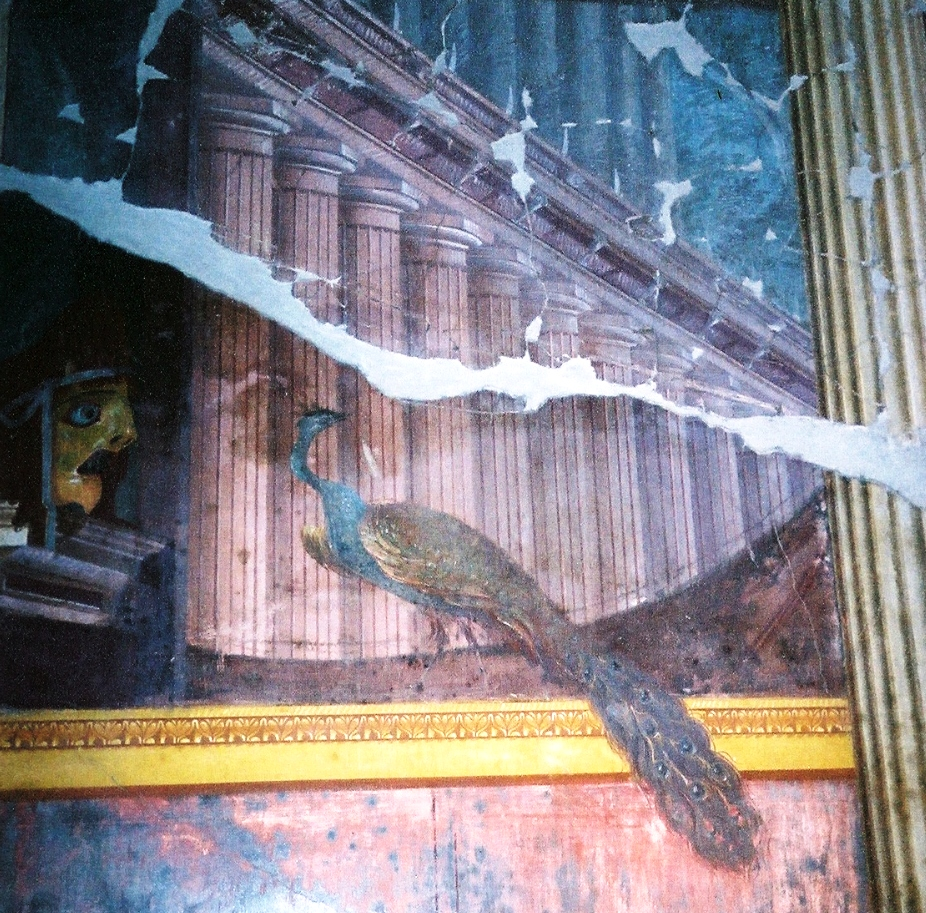

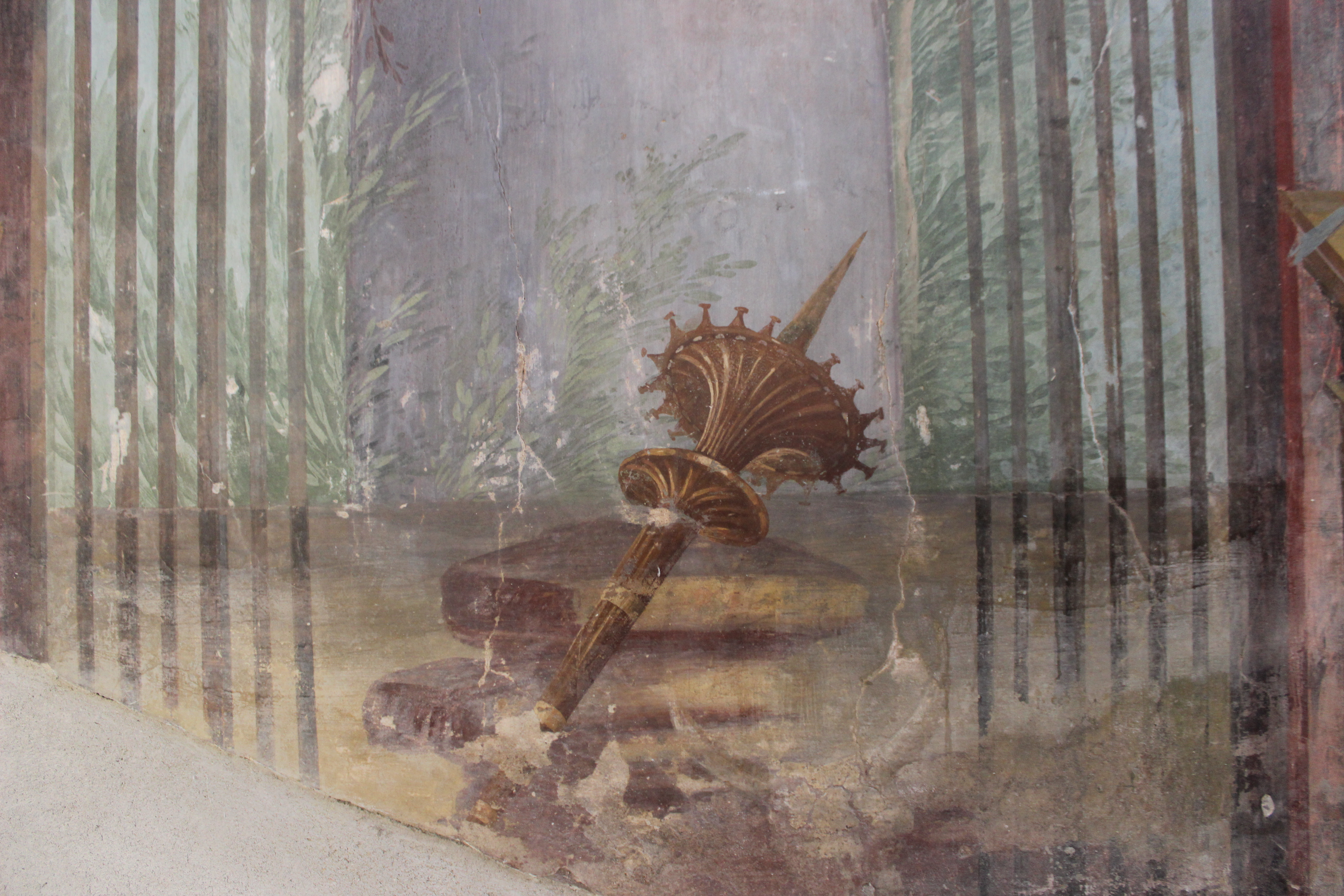

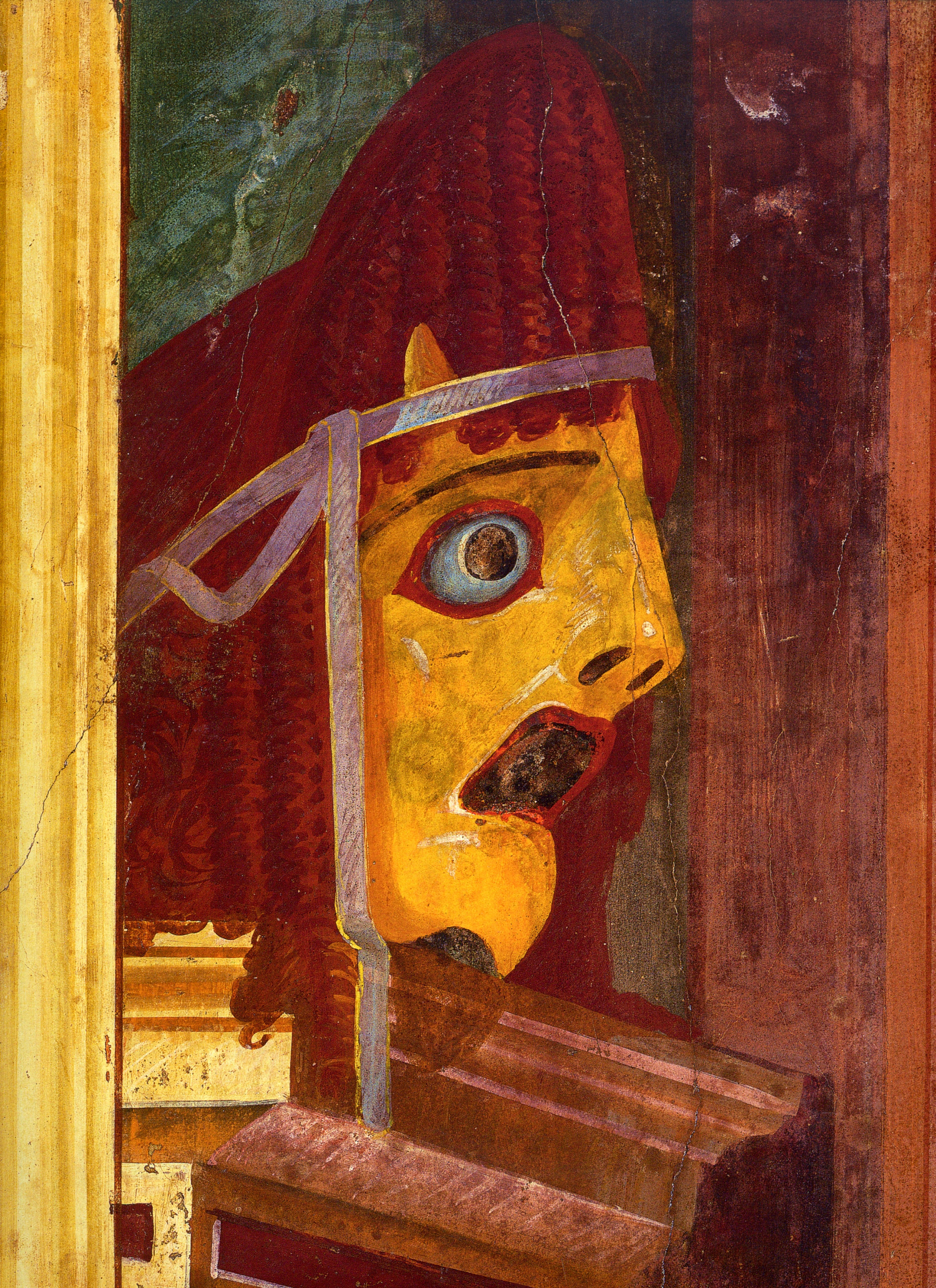

=== Caldarium (3) ===
Frescoes in the caldarium depicting Hercules in the Garden of the Hesperides are painted in the "Third Style" (also called the Ornate Style) dating to ca. 25 BC-40 AD. Attention to realistic perspective is abandoned in favour of flatness and elongated architectural forms which “form a kind of shrine" around a central scene, which is often mythological.

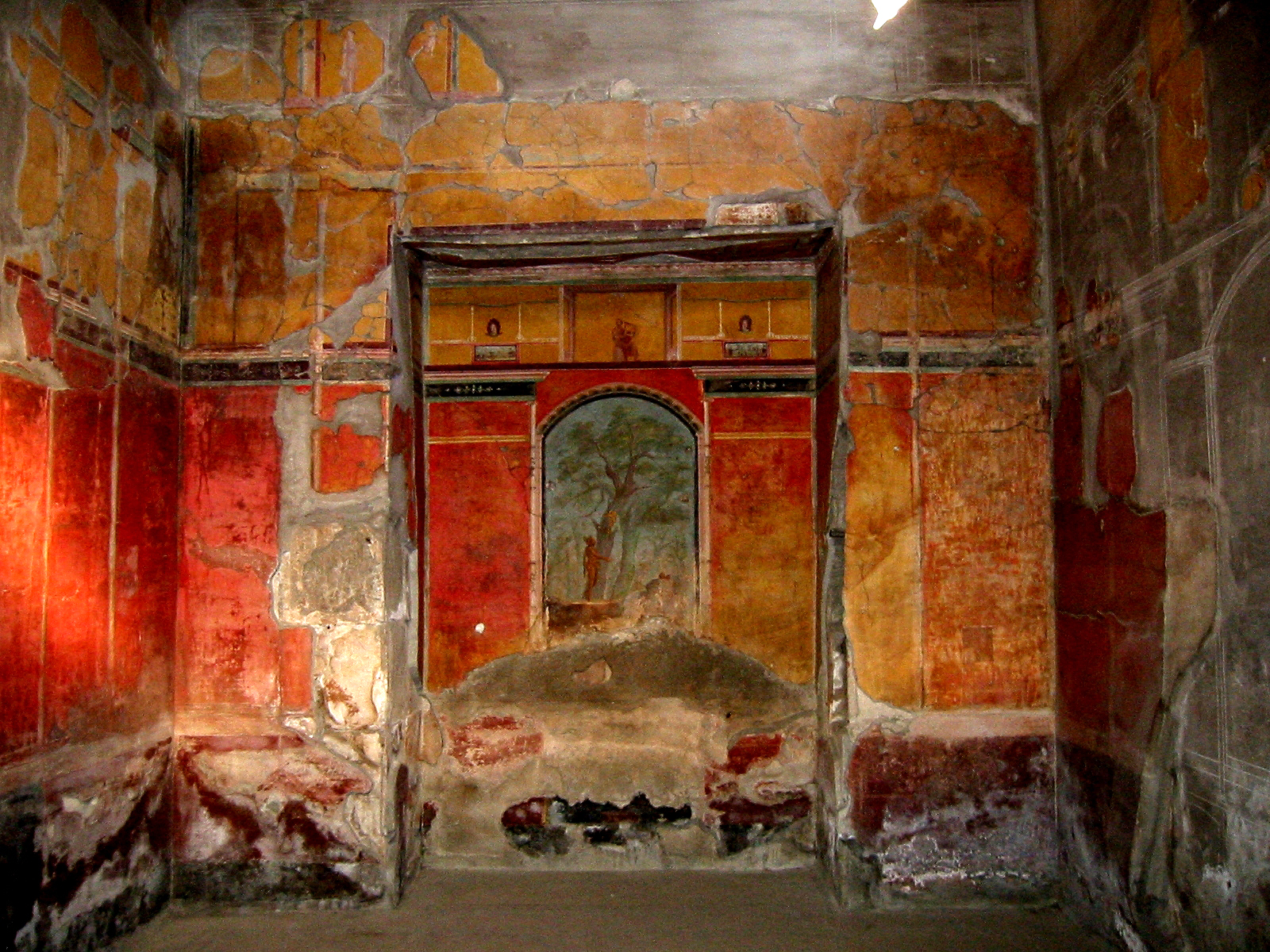

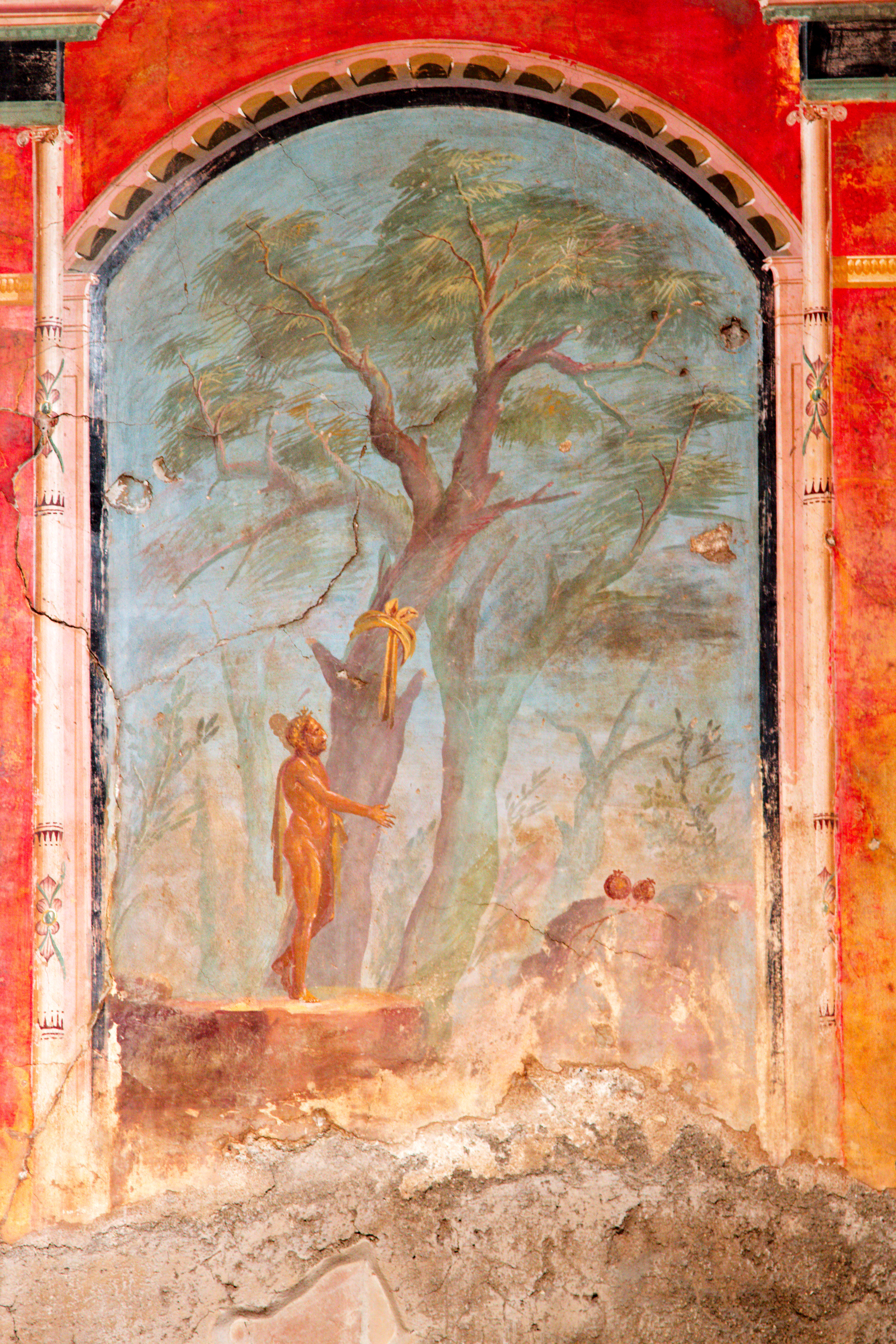

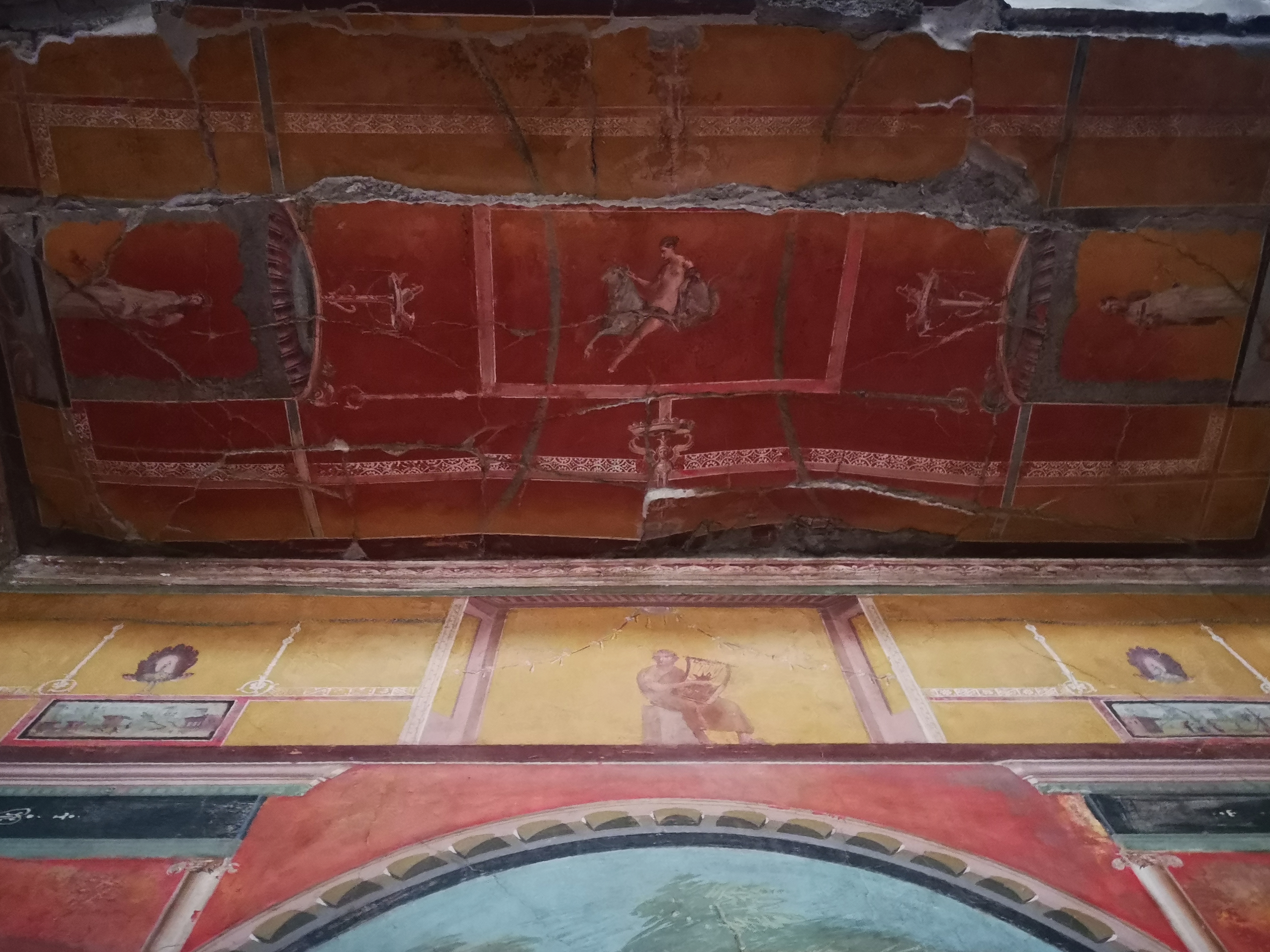

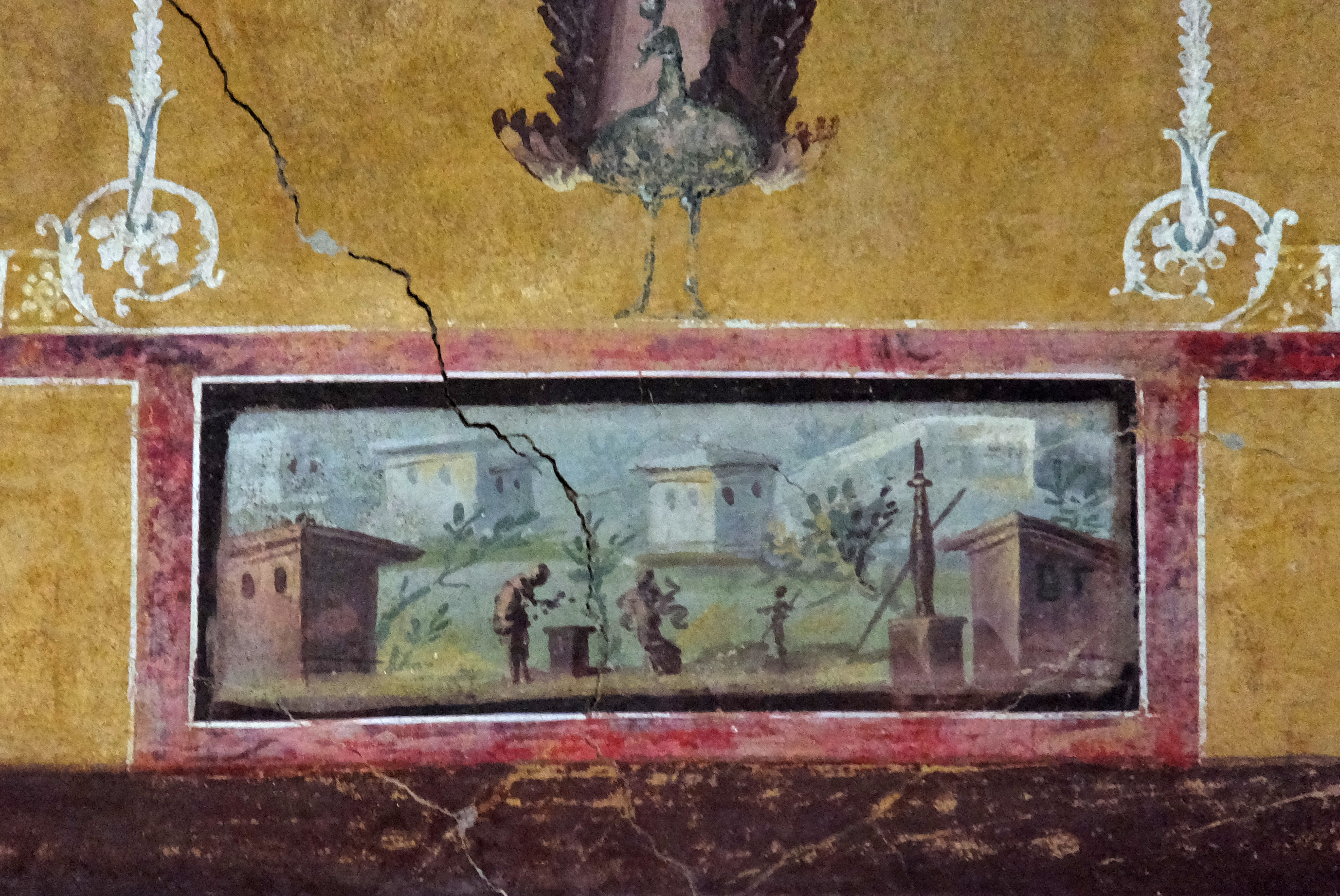

=== Lararium/Sacrarium (27) ===
This is a large windowed room containing the household shrine, and directly overlooking the so-called rustic courtyard, but connected via a corridor to the residential sector centred around the atrium. The room was built in the late Republican era, as demonstrated by the preserved tessellated floor with a carpet of black and white crosses, and was preserved and redecorated in the Fourth Style in the last years of the villa's life. On the rear wall is a large rectangular niche, against the back wall of which is set a large plastered masonry base decorated with an imitation of polychrome marble cladding.

This shrine, like many other examples in the vicinity e.g. at the Villa San Marco at Stabiae, was placed in very emphatic position in a transitional area between the "public" quarters and the commercial and servant quarters of the villas, underscoring its dual function as a private place of worship and also as an official and highly visible expression of the owner's religiosity.

== Gardens ==
By 1993, 13 gardens had been discovered, among which was a peristyle garden in the original portion of the villa. Other gardens include an enclosed garden, multiple courtyard gardens or viridaria, and a larger east garden. The site shows evidence of extensive landscaping, with features such as rows of shade trees and hedges.

In the peristyle garden (10), a large shade tree next to a fountain was found, as well as a sundial, a rake, a hoe, and a hook. The enclosed garden on the grounds, visible from the Villa's atrium, featured wall paintings of plants and birds, and evidence of fruit trees growing in the garden's corners. One courtyard garden also featured wall paintings depicting fountains.

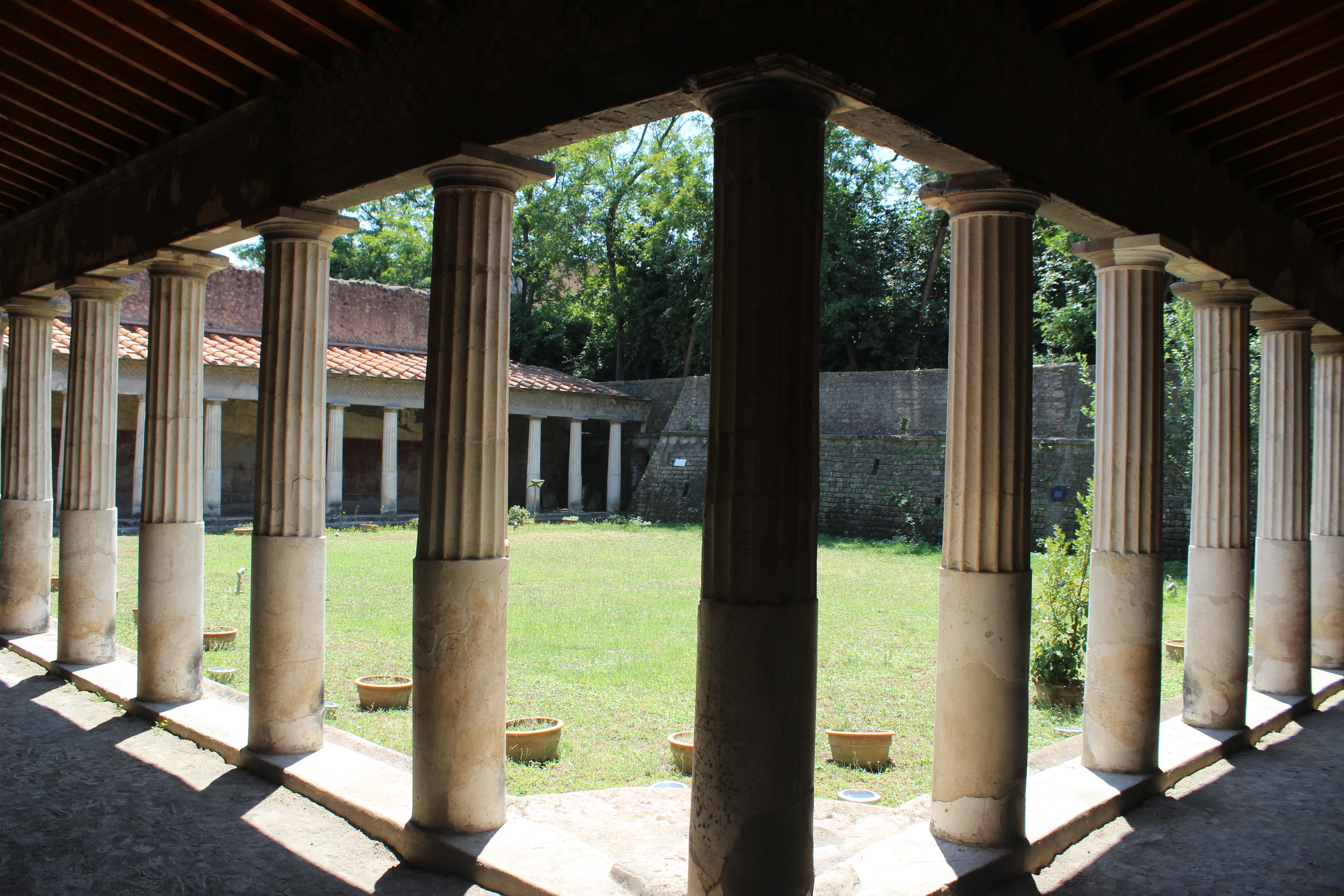
Peristyle garden

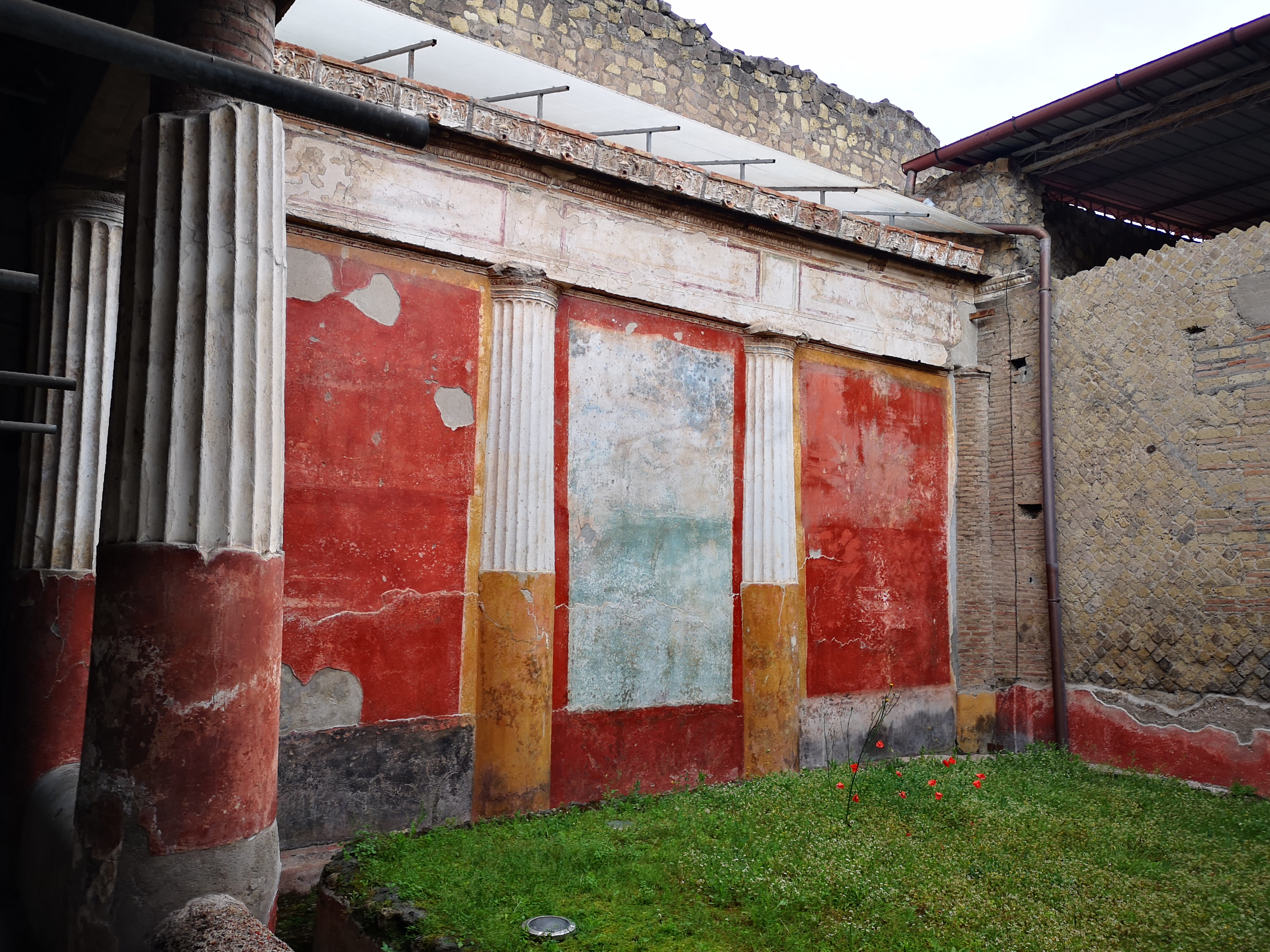
Viridarium

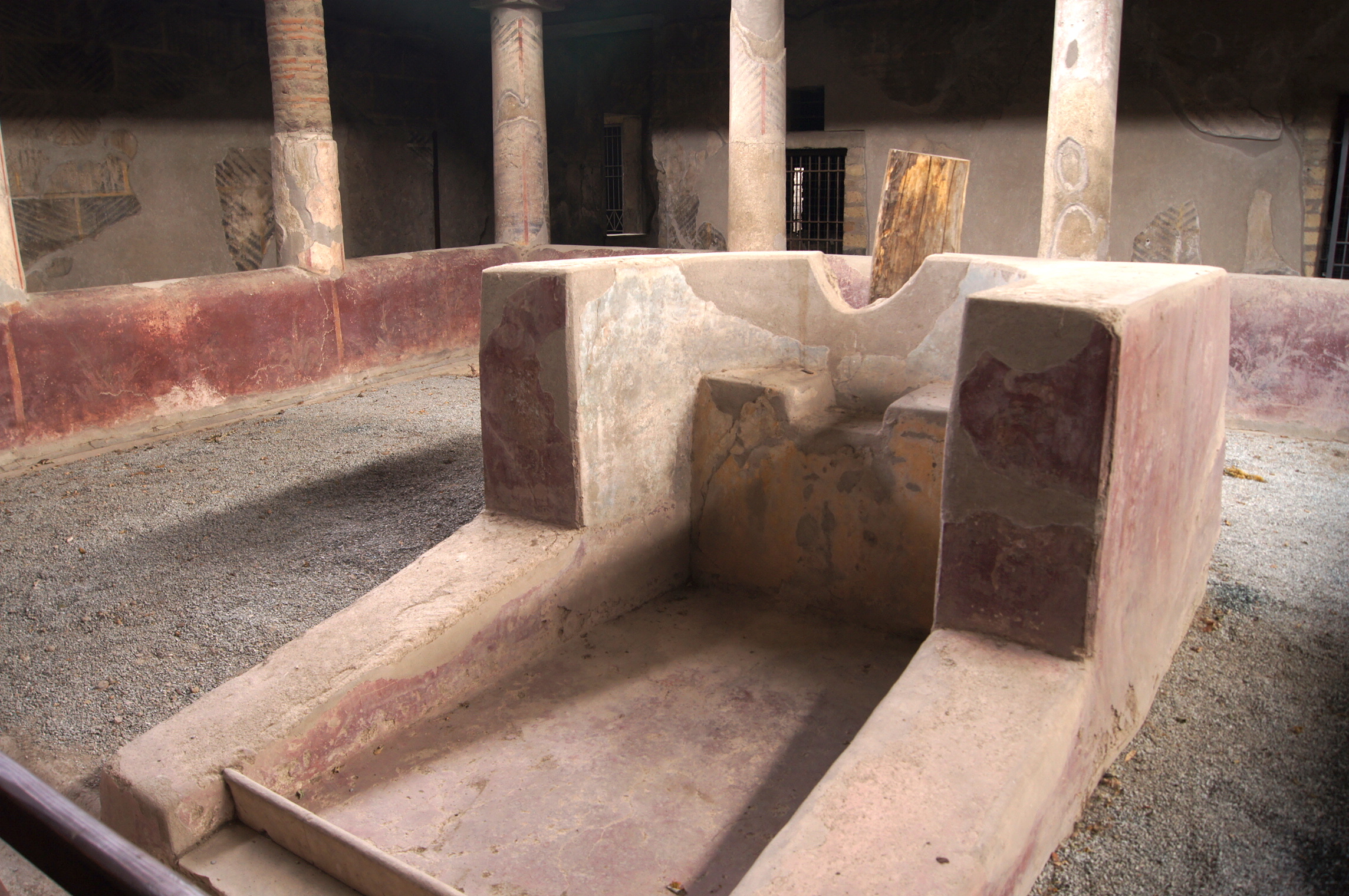
Fountain in garden

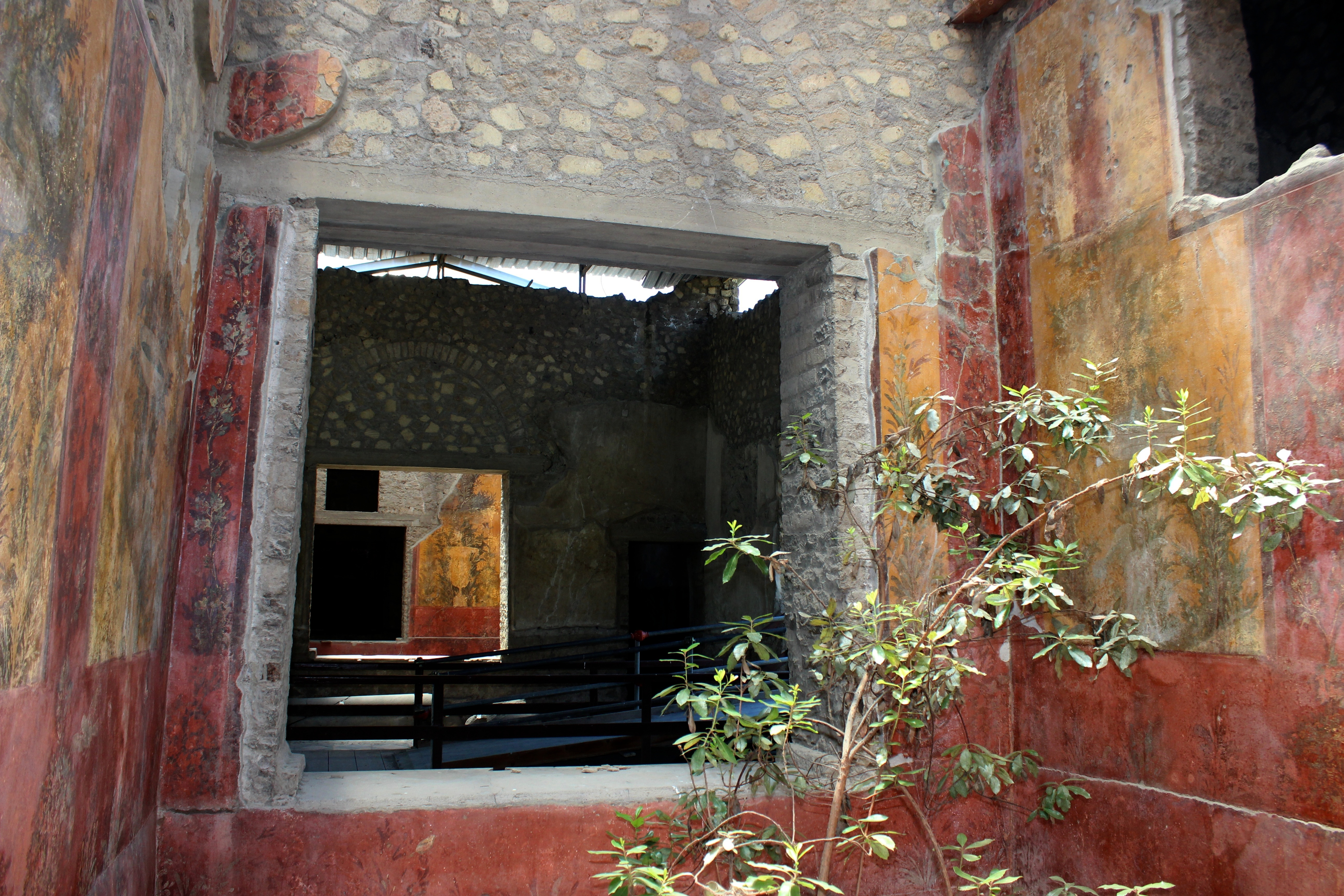
Viridarium (18)

The larger park-like east garden extends from the back of the villa. Cavities that had once housed the roots of large trees were discovered and found to have once held plane trees. The extent of this particular garden is unknown but likely was impressively large as a fifty meter-long pool was found in this garden. Adjacent to the pool, several statue bases have been uncovered as well.

Also found were the remains of tree stumps which were shown to be olives.

Other trees at the Villa Poppaea were also identified, including lemon and oleander; a carbonized apple found on the site indicates the former presence of apple trees. Modern-day replanting of the Villa's gardens was undertaken only after the gardens' original plant types and location were known.

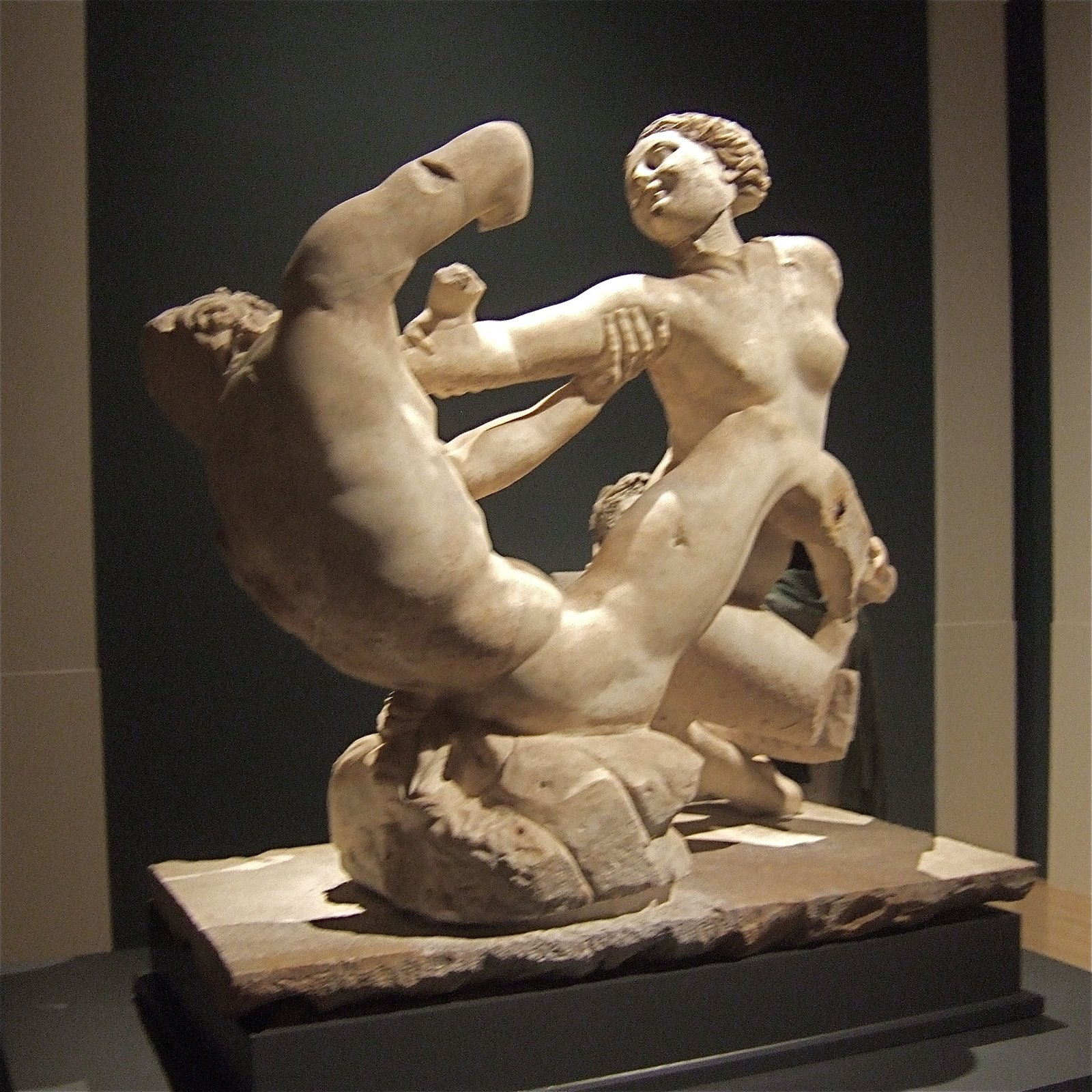
Satyr & Hermaphroditus

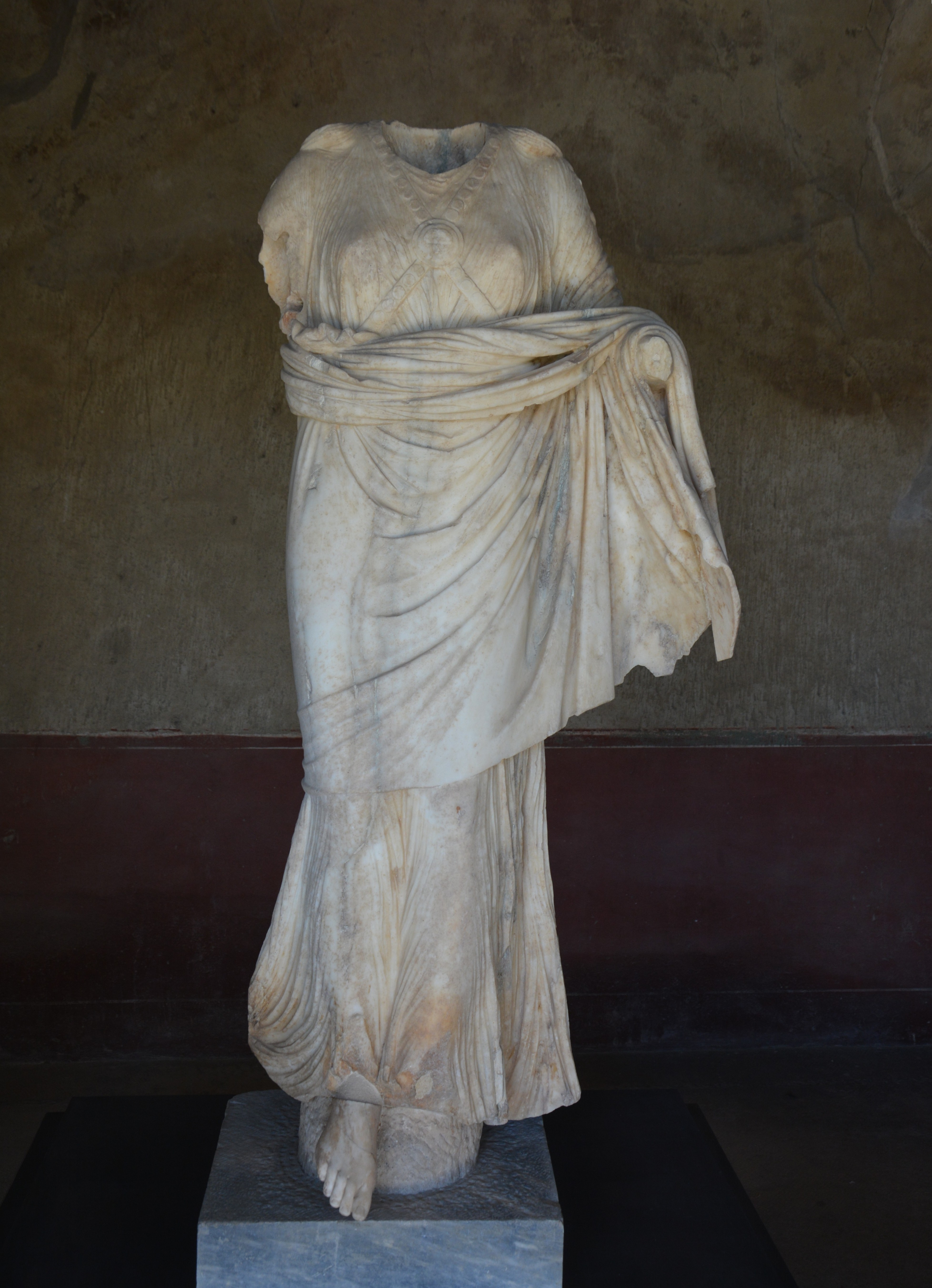

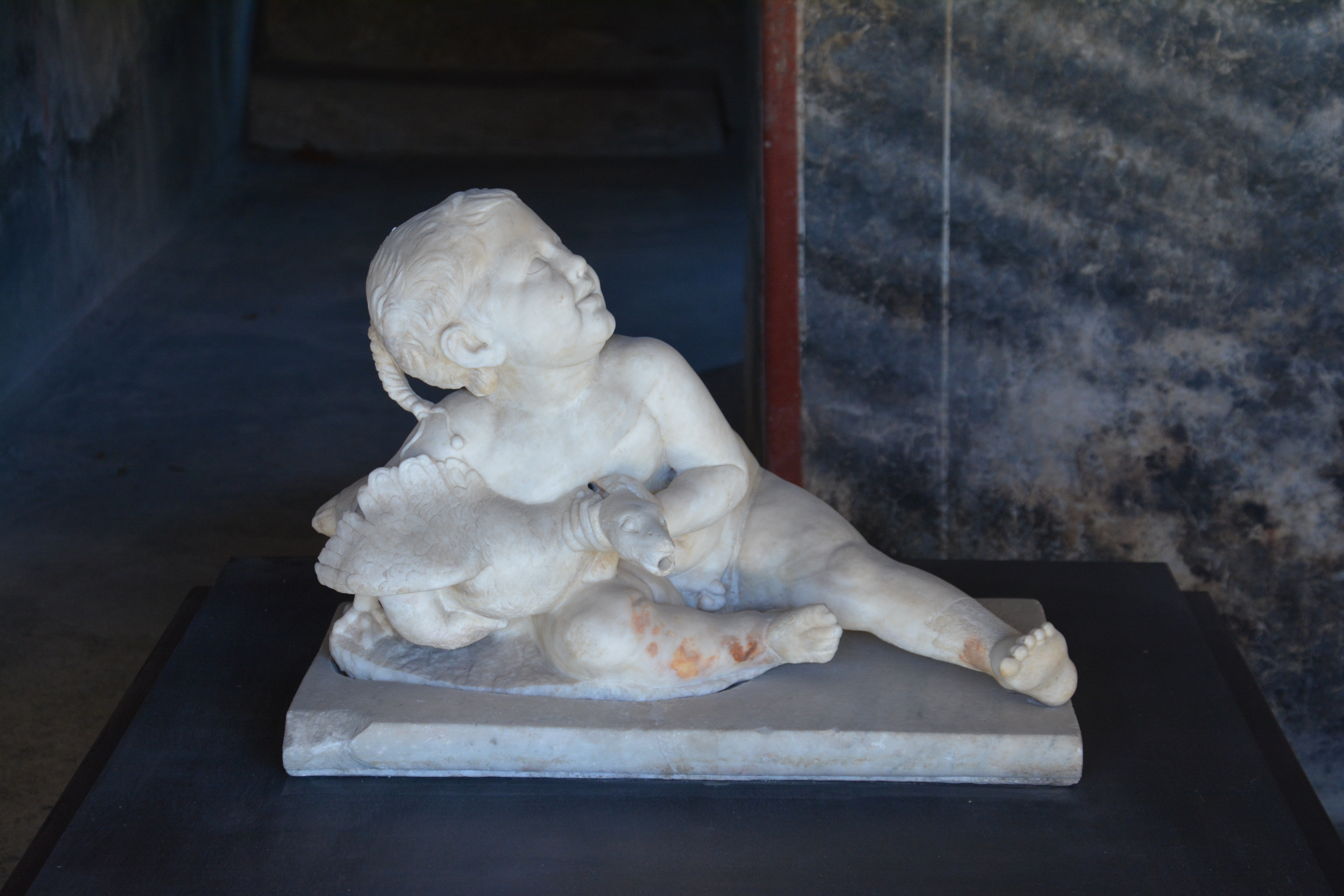

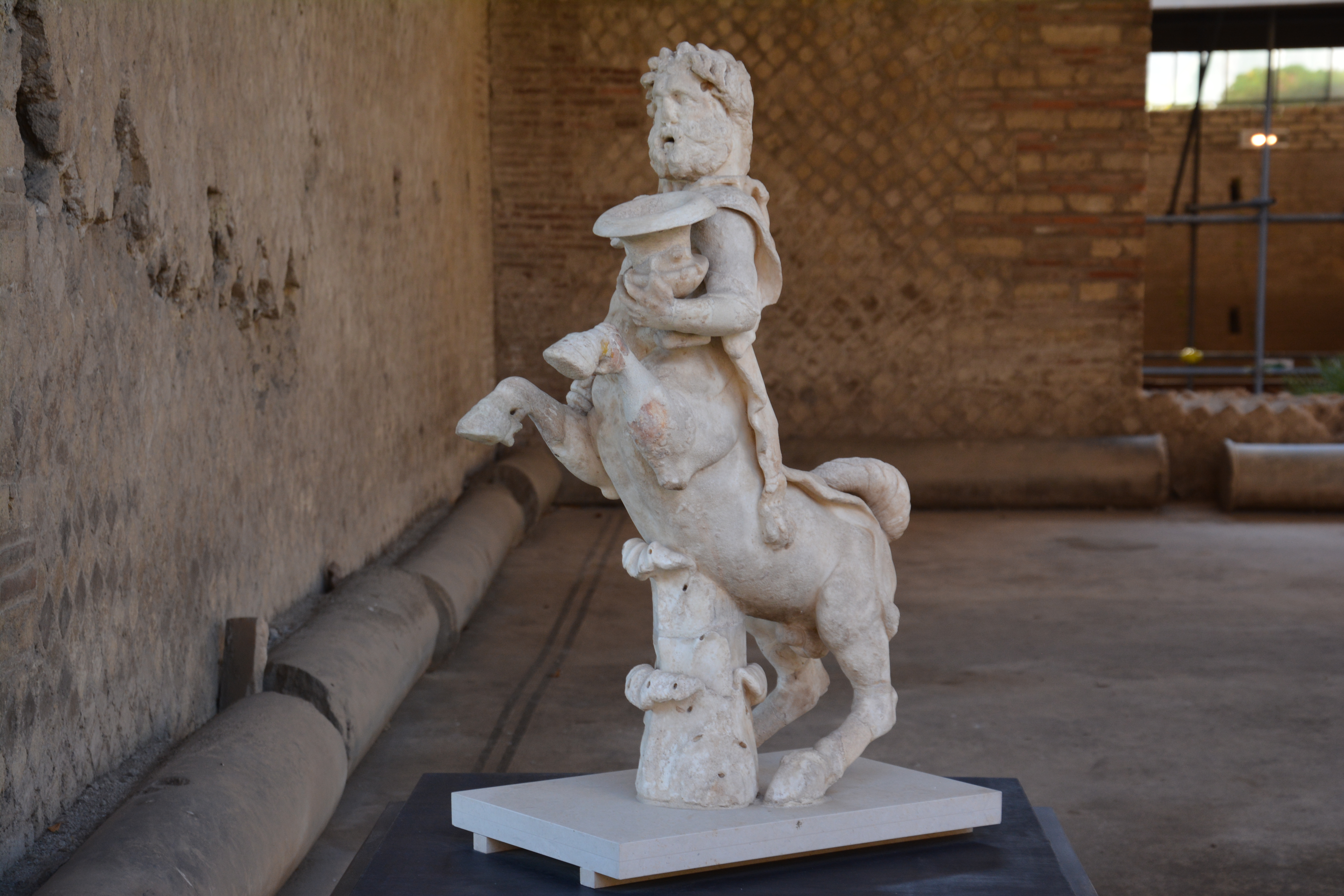
centaur

== Rediscovery and excavation history ==
The Villa of Poppaea was first discovered in the eighteenth century during the construction of the Sarno aqueduct which still cuts through the centre of the villa, but no recognition of the site was made. In 1785 the Spanish architect Francesco La Vega explored this area (known as Le Mascatelle) with tunnels and found beautiful objects but soon gave up due to toxic gases.

In 1839–40 excavations in tunnels were restarted by Michele Rusca using La Vega's publications using the tunnelling technique employed at Herculaneum and removing several paintings. He discovered for the first time the extent and quality of the building including two peristyles, mosaics and garden area. He had to stop due to lack of funds.

Official excavations were done from 1964 until the mid-1980s, at which point the site was excavated to its current level. It was during this final round of excavations that the massive swimming pool, measuring 60 by 17 metres, was unearthed. The villa's southernmost portions have been left unexcavated because of the physical limitations of the complex, which has been compromised by its position beneath the modern city of Torre Annunziata and the Sarno aqueduct.

In 2025 new excavations aimed at protecting and consolidating the existing rooms on the western side of the site have so far brought to light more outstanding frescoes, the quality of which indicates planned decoration intended to impress visitors.

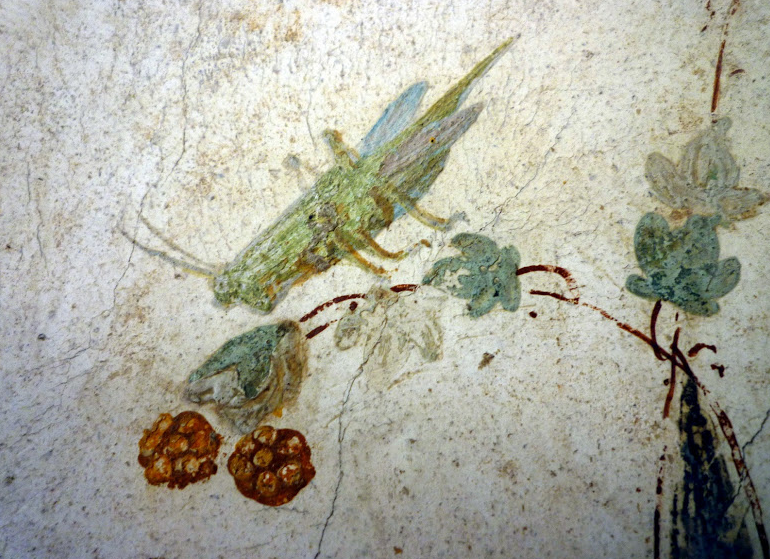
Portico of piscina

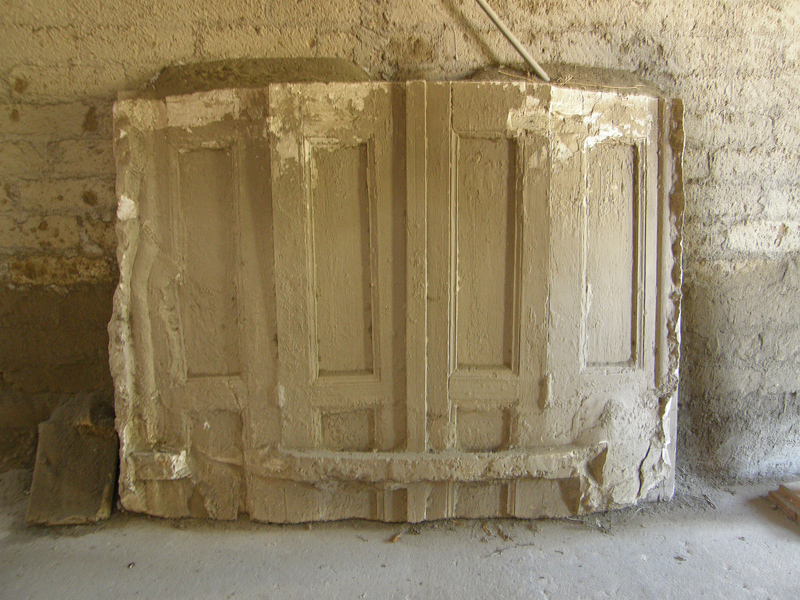
cast of wooden shutters

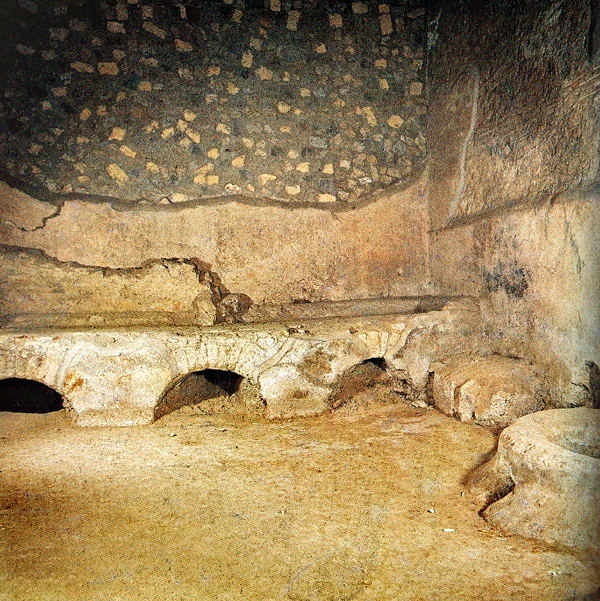
kitchen

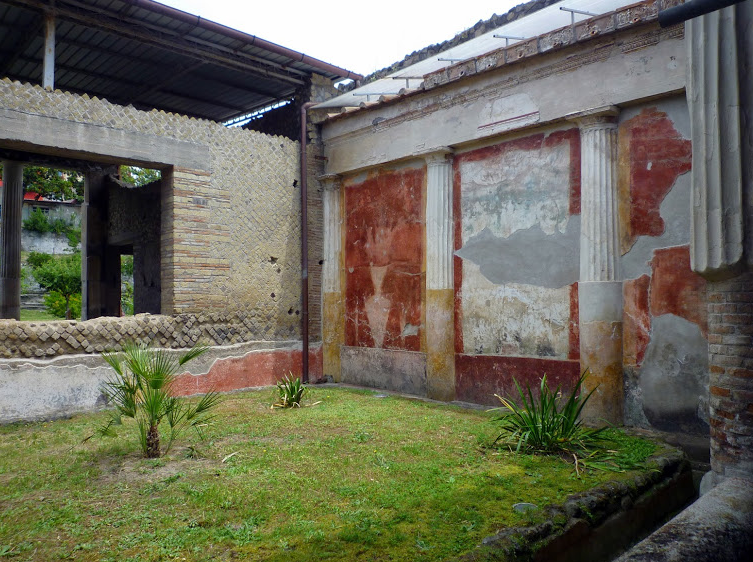
Garden north of atrium

== Nearby villa ==
Nearby is the so-called Villa of L. Crassius Tertius (Oplontis Villa B), partially excavated between 1974 and 1991. In contrast to the sumptuously decorated Villa Poppaea, this villa is a rustic, two-story structure with many rooms left unplastered and with tamped earth floors.

This villa was not deserted at the time of the eruption: the remains of 54 people were recovered in one of the rooms of the villa, perishing in the surge that hit Oplontis. With the victims were found many of their belongings, including fine jewelry, silverware, and coins in the amount of 10,000 sesterces, the second largest by value found in the Vesuvian region after that of Boscoreale.

Some of the rooms seem to have been used for manufacturing, and others were storerooms, while the upper floor contained the living quarters of the house. These circumstances, along with more than 400 amphorae recovered in the excavations, indicate the property was devoted to the production of wine, oil, and agricultural goods. The discovery of a series of weights seems to confirm this theory; a bronze seal found at the site preserved the name of Lucius Crassius Tertius, apparently its last owner.

== Sources ==
- Berry, Joanne (2007). The Complete Pompey. New York City; New York: Thames & Hudson. ISBN 978-0-500-05150-4.
- Bowe, Patrick (2004). Gardens Of The Roman World. Los Angeles, California: J. Paul Getty Museum. ISBN 978-0-7112-2387-5.
- Civale, Anna (2003). "Oplontis". In Guzzo, Pier Giovanni (ed.). Tales from an Eruption: Pompeii, Herculaneum, Oplontis. Milan: Electa. pp. 72–79. ISBN 978-88-370-2363-8.
- Clarke, John R. (1991). The Houses of Roman Italy, 100 B.C.–A.D. 250: Ritual, Space, and Decoration. Berkeley, California: University of California Press. ISBN 978-0-520-08429-2.
- Coarelli, Filippo, ed. (2002). Pompeii. Translated by Patricia A. Cockram. New York City, New York: Riverside Book Company. ISBN 978-1-878351-59-3.
- Jashemski, Wilhelmina Mary Feemster (1979). The Gardens of Pompeii: Herculaneum and the Villas Destroyed by Vesuvius. Vol. 1. New Rochelle: New York: Caratzas Brothers. ISBN 978-0-89241-096-5.
- Jashemski; Feemster, Wilhelmina Mary (1993). The Gardens of Pompeii: Herculaneum and the Villas Destroyed by Vesuvius. Vol. 2 (1st ed.). New Rochelle: New York: Caratzas Brothers. ISBN 978-0-89241-125-2.
- MacDougall, Elisabeth B., ed. (1987). Ancient Roman Villa Gardens. Dumbarton Oaks Colloquia on the History of Landscape Architecture. Vol. 10. Washington, DC: Dumbarton Oaks Research Library and Collection. ISBN 978-0-88402-162-9.
- Wallace-Hadrill, Andrew (1994). Houses and Society in Pompeii and Herculaneum. Princeton, New Jersey: Princeton University Press. ISBN 978-0-691-02909-2.
