= Battle of Nola =

The Battle of Nola may refer to the following engagements at Nola, Italy:

- Battle of Nola (216 BC), during the Second Punic War
- Battle of Nola (215 BC), during the Second Punic War
- Battle of Nola (214 BC), during the Second Punic War
- Battle of Nola (89 BC), during the Social War between Romans and rebels
- Battle of the Sarno (1460), at which John of Anjou defeated Ferdinand of Naples

== See also ==
- Nola
