= Alberto Nocerino =

Italian footballer (born 1975)

Personal information
- Date of birth: 20 December 1975 (age 50)
- Place of birth: Torre Annunziata, Italy
- Height: 1.77 m (5 ft 9 1/2 in)
- Position: Defender

Youth career
- Savoia

Senior career*
Years	Team	Apps	(Gls)
1992–2000	Savoia	129	(4)
1996	→ Leonessa Altamura (loan)	26	(0)
2000–2001	Crotone	24	(0)
2001–2002	Cosenza	0	(0)
2002	Lecco	9	(0)
2002–2005	Benevento	69	(2)
2005–2010	Cavese	135	(4)
2010–2011	Avellino	12	(0)
2011–2012	Viterbese	0	(0)
- * Club domestic league appearances and goals

Alberto Nocerino (born 20 December 1975) is an Italian former football defender.

== Appearances on Italian Series ==
Serie B : 55 Apps, 2 Goals

Serie C1 : 213 Apps, 5 Goals

Serie C2 : 98 Apps, 2 Goals

Total : 366 Apps, 9 Goals
