= Battle of the Sarno =

Battle in Campania, Italy

Battle of the Sarno River
- Part of the War of Neapolitan Succession (1459–1465)
Date	7 July 1460
Location	Plain at the mouth of the Sarno River, south of Mount Vesuvius, Kingdom of Naples (modern-day Campania, Italy)
Result	Angevin victory

Belligerents
John II of Anjou and dissatisfied barons	Ferdinand I's forces

Commanders and leaders
John II of Anjou Dissatisfied barons	Ferdinand I

Casualties and losses
Unknown	Unknown, only 20 men survived

The Battle of the Sarno (7 July 1460), also known as the Battle of Nola, was a decisive defeat of the forces of Ferdinand, king of Naples, by his dissatisfied barons supporting the claim of John of Anjou, duke of Lorraine. It was fought in the plain at the mouth of the Sarno River in Campania, south of Mount Vesuvius. John's forces were strengthened by reinforcements from Jacopo Piccinino, who on the 27th defeated papal and Milanese forces under Alessandro Sforza and Federigo of Urbino near San Fabiano.

Ferdinand escaped with only twenty men but, with the help of Pope Pius II, the duke of Milan, the Albanian lord Skanderbeg, and the king of Aragon, was ultimately able to defeat John at the battle of Troia on 18 August 1462 and off Ischia in 1465.

== See also ==
- Battle of Nola (disambiguation)
