= Peter H. Sarno =

American writer and teacher

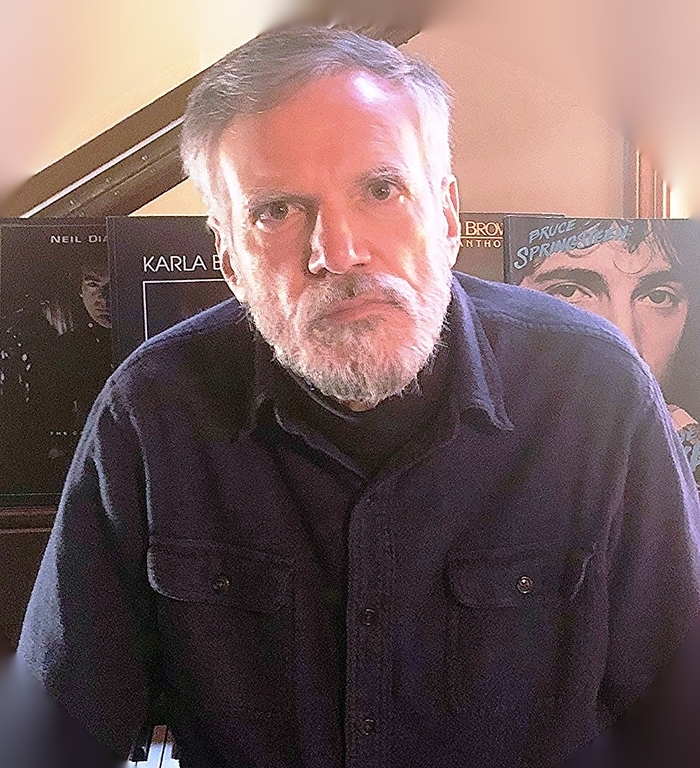
- Born: March 31, 1954 (age 72); Lynn, Massachusetts
- Education: Harvard University, ALB University of Massachusetts Boston, MA
- Occupations: Novelist; Short-story writer; Teacher; Editor; Journalist
- Spouse: Nanette Sarno

Peter H. Sarno (March 31, 1954) is an American novelist, short story writer, journalist, editor, and teacher.

== Early life and education ==
Sarno was born in Lynn, Massachusetts, and raised in nearby Revere, Massachusetts. He attended Salem State University and received a bachelor's degree from Harvard Extension School, later enrolling in graduate courses at Boston University before earning a Master of Arts from the University of Massachusetts Boston. While a graduate student at UMass Boston, Sarno won the Donald E. Cookson prize in non-fiction.

== Career ==
Sarno taught computer courses at Northern Essex Community College and literature and memoir courses at the University of Massachusetts Boston. His work has appeared in The Boston Globe, Music World, Gannett newspapers, GateHouse Media, and other outlets.

In 2011, Sarno founded PFP Publishing. That house subsequently released works by Roland Merullo, Craig Nova, Suzanne Strempek Shea, Elizabeth Searle, Steve Forbert, Sterling Watson, Tony Eprile, Jaime Clarke, Beth Harrington, Lloyd Schwartz, Askold Melnyczuk, and other authors. Of that effort, Michael Upchurch of the Seattle Times wrote, "Craig Nova’s 1989 masterpiece, Tornado Alley, is back in both e-book and physical formats, thanks to PFP Publishing, the brainchild of Peter Sarno, a University of Massachusetts literature instructor who’s making out-of-print classics available so he can—for one thing—keep teaching them."

According to Shelf Awareness, Sarno's vision of a publisher's mission is deeply rooted in his own reading life: "Starting with a novella I found in Stone Soup Books in Camden, Maine, I fell in love with the work of Andre Dubus, eventually getting my hands on all his stuff—fiction and nonfiction alike. And, I thought, why is it that I didn't know him, hadn't been introduced to his work before? So I assigned his books to my students, several of whom would end up choosing Dubus as the focus of their final projects. Later I found out via Ted Delaney's documentary The Times Were Never So Bad and other sources how David Godine was the first to take a chance on Dubus and how Andre remained loyal to him when the big houses came calling. It helped me to think of publishing in a different way — with a small 'p'. And, I thought of the achievements of Godine, Askold, Joe Torra, William_Corbett_(poet) and others, realizing the noble and important efforts publishers make—spreading the word, supporting the artists. If it weren't for Godine Publishing (and an independent bookstore in Maine), I wouldn't have 'discovered' Dubus. If it weren't for Askold Melnyczuk, I wouldn't have read Merullo."

"There's a need for strong, creative, and honest literary fiction out there,” said Sarno. "Unfortunately, many of the larger publishing firms are no longer interested in that kind of work or they can no longer afford to be interested in that kind of literature. This is not only a shame for established and dedicated authors—but how will new talents emerge and be nurtured if it simply becomes a numbers game and you’re only as good as your last book? I believe this void can be filled by small, artist-friendly and technologically savvy publishing firms like ours."

Sarno cites Ann Beattie, Andre Dubus, and Richard Russo as some of his influences. His novel Visions of Johanna was published in 2022. It was named one of the "Best Reviewed Books of September" by IndieReader and one of the "20 Favorites From 2022 That You’ve Probably Never Heard Of" by BookTrib. Of that book, Kirkus Reviews said ,"Johanna and Matt's romance is deep and intense…Sarno, an award-winning nonfiction author, literature professor, and journalist, paints an evocative portrait of New York and Boston in the '80s…The details of Matt's backstory are rich and intriguing." In a starred review, Booklist wrote, "Sarno’s beautifully written literary novel concerns an unlikely pairing…The author skillfully portrays Matt, drawing readers into the story with his use of metaphor and lush language…As the story reaches its affecting conclusion, readers may even shed a tear or two."

In Fall 2026, Sarno published A River of Memory—the first book of the proposed River trilogy. Kirkus Reviews wrote, "What keeps the drama engaging is Sarno’s knack for miniaturist character detail…Perceptive and, at times, strikingly elegant…An even-handed, imaginative, and skillfully written portrayal of an artist’s journey to wholeness." Publishers Weekly BookLife called it "A moving novel powered by family secrets, self-discovery, and forgiveness" and in a starred review, BlueInk said, "With layered characters, both charming and flawed, the author’s writing is deceptively simple, somehow managing to be lilting and poetic, yet devoid of pretension…This is a lovely, carefully drawn tale—one that readers will hate to see come to an end."

== Personal life ==
Sarno and his wife, Nanette, live in Rockport, Maine. He has two sisters: Laura and Linda, as well as a brother, Paul.

== Bibliography ==
=== Novels ===
- Visions of Johanna (2022)
- A River of Memory (2026)

=== Short stories ===
- "Invitations: A Story of Thanksgiving" (2014)

=== Audio Books ===
- "Invitations: A Story of Thanksgiving" (2024)
