= Sarno (river) =

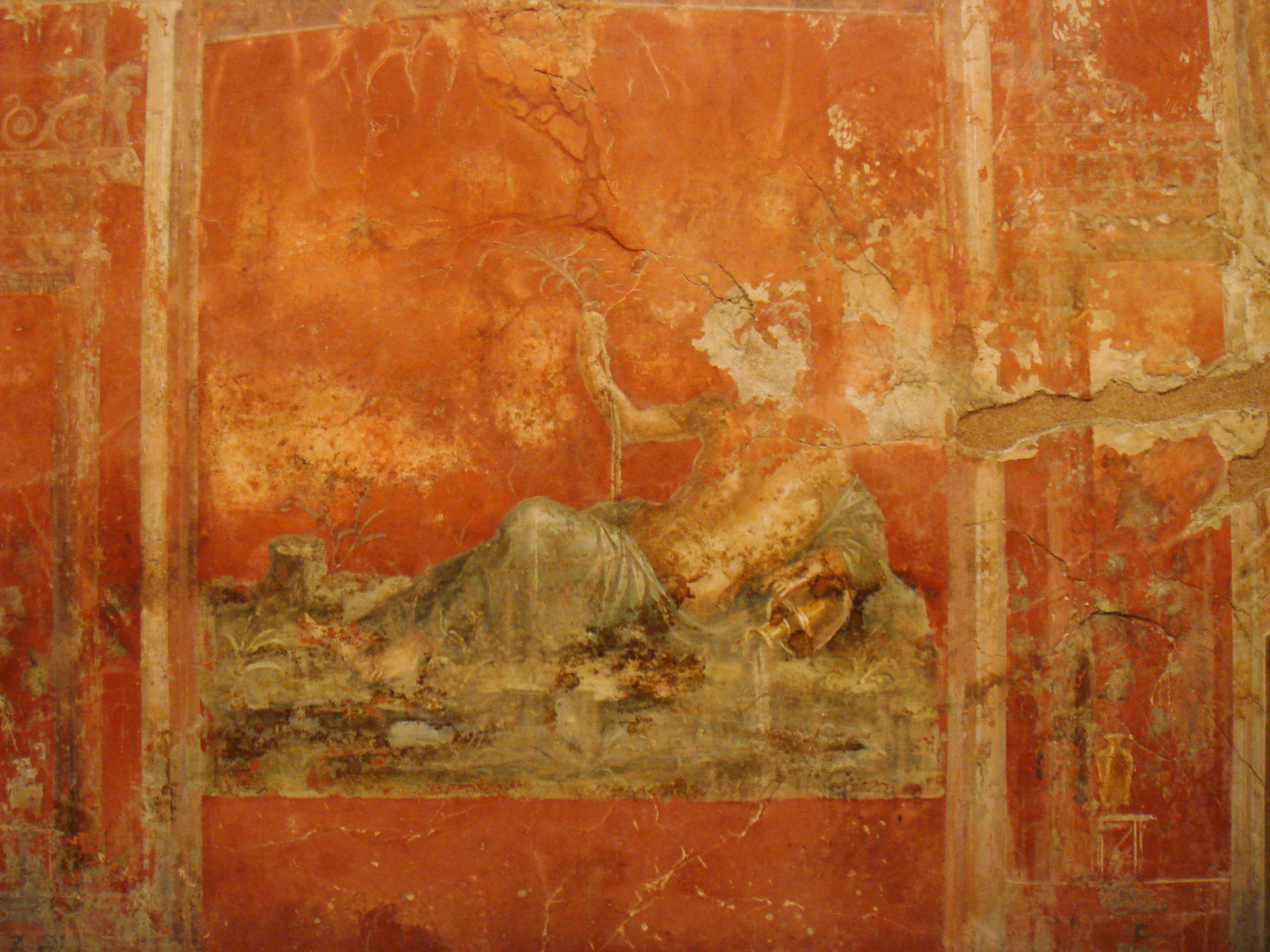
- Personification of Sarno in Pompei

Location
- Country: Italy

Physical characteristics
- Source
  - location: Above Sarno
  - elevation: 30 m (98 ft)
- Mouth: Tyrrhenian Sea
  - location: Bay of Naples, near Pompeii
  - coordinates: 40.7285°N 14.4692°E
- Length: 24 km (15 mi)
- Basin size: 715 km^{2} (276 sq mi)
- Discharge
  - average: 10 m^{3}/s (350 cu ft/s) at Scafati

The Sarno, known as Sarnus to the Romans, is a stream that passes through Pompeii to the south of the Italian city of Naples. It is considered the most polluted river in Europe. It flows about 24 kilometres (15 mi) from the base of Mt. Sarno to the Bay of Naples, collecting water from the Solofrana and Cavaiola tributaries during the course of its flow.

It is still partially used for irrigation, as well as the transportation of goods and fishing. It is part of the Sarno river basin, which covers about 715 square kilometres (276 mi^{2}).

The Sarno is one of the most polluted rivers in Europe, due to agricultural waste and insufficiently treated industrial wastewater.

There are about 500 small industrial units in the area that still emit pollution. Water treatment plants have been installed; however, they do not work at full capacity. The mouth of the river continues to make bathing in the sea impossible, despite numerous protests.

The plain at the mouth of the river was the site of the Battle of the Sarno, fought in 1460.
