= Siege of Arpi =

- Part of the Second Punic War
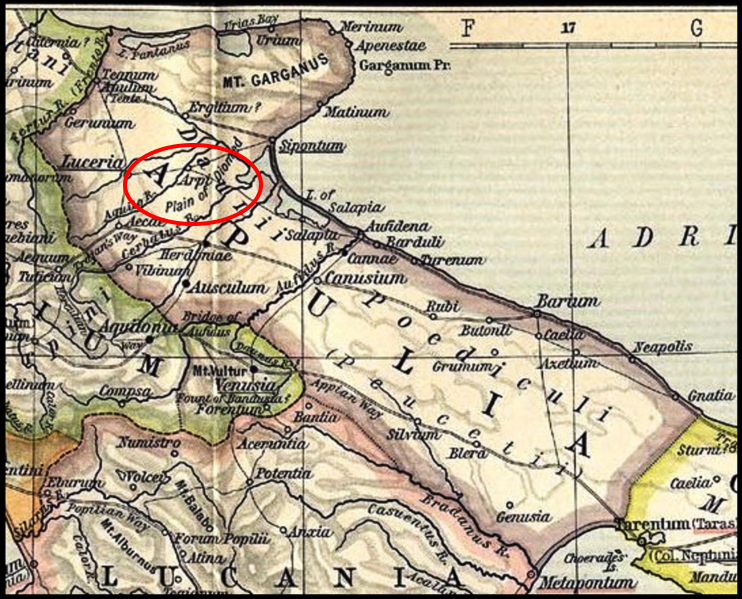
- Arpi
Date	213 BC
Location	Arpi, Italy
Result	Roman victory

Belligerents
Roman Republic	Carthage

Commanders and leaders
Quintus Fabius	Hannibal

Strength
2 legions and 2 Ala (20,000 men)	5,000 Carthaginians; 3,000 soldiers of Arpi

Casualties and losses
Unknown	Unknown

The siege of Arpi took place in 213 BC by the Romans against the inhabitants of Arpi. The Roman forces were commanded by the consul Quintus Fabius Maximus, who managed to convince the inhabitants of the city to go over to the Romans' side, driving out the Carthaginians.

== Background ==
After the crushing victory at Cannae (216 BC), Hannibal achieved his first important results political-strategic. Some centers began to abandon the Romans, like Campani, Atellani, Calatini, part of Apulia, the Samnites (excluding the Pentri), all the Bruzi, the Lucanians, the Uzentini and almost the entire Greek coast, the Tarentini, those of Metaponto, of Crotone, of Locri and all the Cisalpine Gauls, and then Compsa, together with the Hirpini. However, Neapolis did not surrender and remained faithful to Rome.

In the following years Annibale went to Apulia several times. In 215 BC, after being defeated at Nola, he placed the winter camps right near Arpi. The consul Quintus Fabius Maximus Verrucosus then ordered the younger consul, Tiberius Sempronius Gracchus, to conduct his legions from Cuma to Lucera in Apulia, and sent the praetor Marcus Valerius Laevinus to Brundisium with the army that he had with him previously in Lucera, tasking him with defending the coasts of the Salento countryside and supervising the movements of Philip V of Macedonia in view of a possible war with Macedonia.

Roman campaigns after the Battle of Nola, 215 BC

The following year (214 BC), Hannibal left Arpi to return to Campania, followed by Tiberius Gracchus, who moved his army from Luceria to Beneventum; meanwhile the son of Fabius Maximus, the praetor Quintus Fabius Maximus Verrucosus, was ordered to leave for Apulia and replace Gracchus there. After spending the winter in Arpi, Hannibal returned to Mount Tifata in the territory of Capua, while Hanno was deployed in Bruttium; the Carthaginian leader ordered Anno to go back north and unsuccessfully launched a third attack on Nola; the attempt to take Puteoli was also rejected. Hannibal had understood how, faced with the prudence of the opposing commanders and the number of his enemies, it was now impossible to achieve other great field victories, he was probably counting on the help of the motherland and of Philip V However, Hannibal continued to fight fiercely, showing great skill even in this new, predominantly defensive phase of the war. However, the Romans achieved some successes, reconquering Compulteria, Telesia, Compsa in Samnium, Aecae in Apulia. At the end of the fifth season of the war, the Carthaginian commander headed for Taranto, hoping that at least this city would betray the Romans.

=== Casus belli ===
The following year (213 BC) saw, once again, the war against Hannibal entrusted to the two consuls of the year: Quintus Fabius Maximus Verrucosus had Apulia, accompanied by his father Quinto, of whom he was legatus, while Sempronius Gracchus, Lucania.

In the camp of Suessula where the two Fabis had stopped, ready to leave for Apulia, a citizen of Arpi, Dasio Altinio, came secretly at night with three of his slaves. The citizen promised the consul to hand over the city to him in exchange for a reward. During the war council that followed, some advised Fabius to beat him with rods and put him to death as a deserter, since after the battle of Cannae, Dasio had switched to Hannibal's side, dragging Arpi into the rebellion. And now that Rome seemed to be reborn he was willing to "give a new betrayal in return to those who had been betrayed".

He was always with one party while at the same time sympathizing with the other, a disloyal ally, an inconstant enemy.

Fabio, the father, believed instead that, given the particular moment of the war, it was necessary to consider Dasio Altinio, not an enemy but not even an ally, keeping him on probation in some faithful city, not far from the camps. And only once the war was over, it would be decided what to do, whether to punish him or forgive him. Now it was more necessary than ever to prevent Rome from being abandoned by other cities, allowing them to bind themselves to the Carthaginians. In the end his opinion received everyone's approval. Altinius was handed over to the ambassadors of Cales who were ordered to keep for him a large quantity of gold that he had brought with him. And when in Arpi they learned that he had been forcibly removed, many overcome by fear sent ambassadors to Hannibal. Hannibal then, taking the opportunity to appropriate the substances of such a rich man, he summoned Altinius' wife and children and after knowing how much gold and silver was left in the house, he had them burned alive.

== Siege ==
The consul Fabio, leaving from Suessula, set out to attack Arpi. He set up camp nearly 500 paces (750 meters) from the city walls. He carefully analyzed the position of the city and its fortifications, realizing that the part best defended by the walls was also the least guarded. He therefore decided to launch the assault precisely at this point.

Having prepared everything to attack the city, he chose the best of his centurions from the whole army, placing the bravest tribunes at their head and assigned them 600 soldiers. He ordered them to take the stairs at the agreed signal for the fourth watch (between three and six in the morning). Here there was a door low and narrow that led to a little-used street, in an almost deserted part of the city. The consul ordered them that, once they had scaled the walls, they would unhinge the door from the inside to allow the other departments of the Roman army to enter, after an agreed horn signal. The undertaking was then helped by the fact that around midnight it began to rain heavily, forcing the sentries to move away from their positions to take refuge in the nearby buildings. And even the sound of the pouring rain prevented the din of those who forced the door from being heard.

And when the Romans took possession of the gate, the cornicines blew the trumpets to give the signal to the consul. Fabius then ordered his men to take the banners out of the camps and shortly before dawn he entered the city through the unhinged gate. The inhabitants of Arpi woke up, now that the rain had stopped and dawn could be glimpsed. There were about five thousand of Hannibal's men garrisoned in the city, while the inhabitants of Arpi had three thousand.

The Carthaginians were the first to meet the Romans. Initially the battle was fought in the darkness of the narrow streets. Later the citizens of Arpi and the Romans began to talk to each other. The former were asked why they, who were Italians, had preferred to ally themselves with the Carthaginians, making Italy a tributary of Africa. Finally the praetor of Arpi was brought before the consul. Having given the Romans the necessary reassurances of loyalty, suddenly the inhabitants of Arpi turned their weapons against the Carthaginians, in favor of the Romans. Even the Iberians who were just under 1,000, handed over their insignia to Fabius without placing any conditions, except that of asking the Romans to allow the Carthaginian garrison to leave the city of Arpi unharmed. The gates were then opened and the Carthaginians were able to reach Salapia, where Hannibal was.

== Consequences ==
Thus Arpi, without any massacre, except for the death of the only traitor, returned to the Romans as an ally. The Iberian troops were assigned a double ration of wheat.

== Sources ==
- Theodor Mommsen (2001). Storia di Roma antica. Milano: Sansoni. ISBN 978-88-383-1882-5.
- Howard Hayes Scullard (1992). Storia del mondo romano. Dondazione di Roma alla distruzione di Cartagine. Milano: BUR. ISBN 88-17-11574-6.
- Giovanni Brizzi (1997). Storia di Roma. 1. Dalle origini ad Azio. Bologna: Patron. ISBN 978-88-555-2419-3.
