= Nicola Napolitano =

Nicola Napolitano may refer to:

- Nicola Napolitano (brigand) (1838–1863), also known by the nickname of Caprariello, brigand in the area of Avellino
- Nicola Napolitano (footballer) (born 1983), Italian football midfielder
