= Vulcano Buono =

Il Vulcano Buono
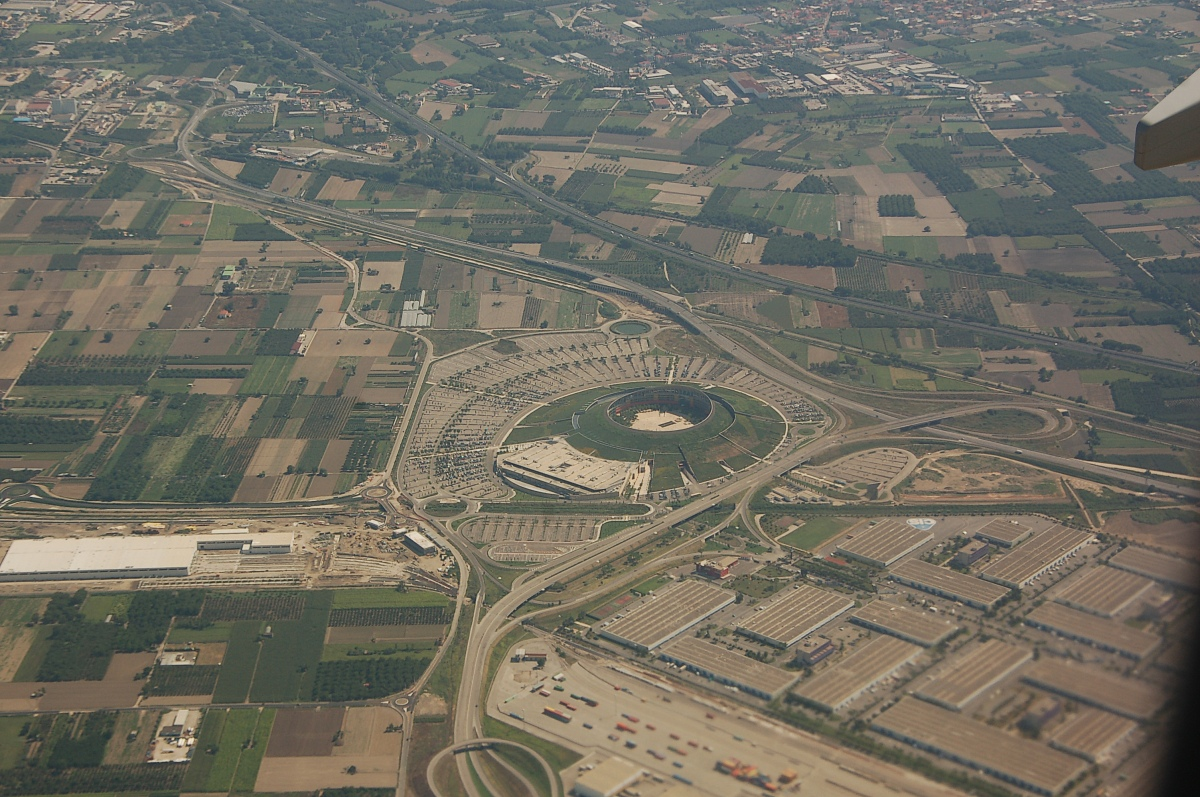
- Vulcano Buono
- Location: Nola, Italy
- Coordinates: 40.949761°N 14.487920°E
- Opened: December 7, 2007
- Architect: Renzo Piano
- Website: www.vulcanobuono.it

Il Vulcano Buono (Italian: The Good Volcano) is a shopping mall and leisure center located in Nola, near the frazione of Polvica, Italy. Inaugurated on December 7, 2007, it was designed by renowned Italian architect Renzo Piano.

== Overview ==
The complex is a large multi-center consisting of a five star hotel, a spa with a gym and an indoor pool, a multiplex cinema and a gallery, double-height of 155 shops and several restaurants and bars. At the center there is a large circular square, which resembles the Naples' Piazza del Plebiscito and is used for concerts and events. The lobbies of the entrances consist of large squares connected to each other by avenues named after famous Neapolitan actors such as Antonio de Curtis (Totò), Massimo Troisi, Tina Pica and Pupella Maggio, while the upper floor is connected via escalators and elevators.

== Architecture ==
The architectural aspect of the building consists of a set of solid circles, each of them having a different slope, which fuse to form a volcano-structure which imitates the look of Vesuvius. The upper edge of the volcano-like structure has a height that varies from 25 to 41 meters, with a total diameter of 320 meters. The central square of 160 meters in diameter is divided into three concentric zones, the internal with a stage dedicated to shows and concerts, the medium reserved to the shops and the external zone that crowns the building consisting of a large park filled with pine trees.

From the outside, except for the five different entrances (called Capri, Sorrento, Amalfi, Positano and Ischia), the building is practically invisible as an architectural work as the reinforced concrete roofs are covered with soil, grass and bushes, effectively hiding the structure.

The project started in 1995, and works began in 2002. It was completed in 2007 at a cost of 180 million euros, partly covered by regional funding for reconstruction and development. The entire establishment occupies an area of approximately 500,000 m^{2} (5,400,000 sq ft), the floor area is 150,000 m^{2} (1,600,000 sq ft), and there are parking lots for 8,000 cars. The building hosts the largest photovoltaic roof system in Europe.

In 2007, the then President of Italy Giorgio Napolitano praised the structure, referring to it as "a marvellous face of Naples", "an amazing project" and "an example for Italy and for Europe".
