= Nola =

Town in Naples, Campania, Italy

- Comune
- Comune di Nola
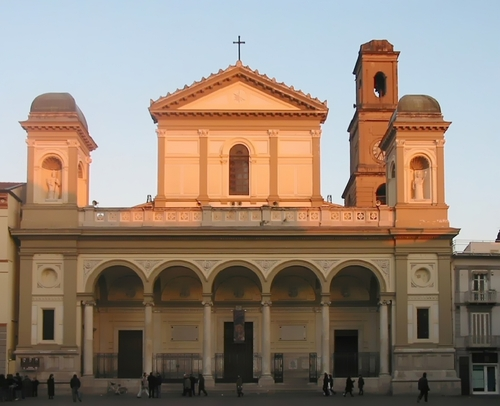

- Location within Italy Location within Campania
- Coordinates: 40°55′34″N 14°31′39″E
- Country: Italy
- Region: Campania
- Metropolitan city: Naples (NA)

Area
  - Total: 39.19 km^{2} (15.13 sq mi)

Population (2018-01-01)
  - Total: 34,467
  - Density: 879.5/km^{2} (2,278/sq mi)
- Time zone: UTC+1 (CET)
  - Summer (DST): UTC+2 (CEST)
- Patron saint: St. Felix Martyr
- Saint day: January 14
- Website: comune.nola.na.it

Nola is a city and comune in the Metropolitan City of Naples, Campania, southern Italy. It lies on the plain between Mount Vesuvius and the Apennines. It is traditionally credited as the diocese that introduced bells to Christian worship.

== History ==
=== Prehistory ===
Excavations at Nola-Croce del Papa have uncovered extensive evidence of a small village quickly abandoned at the time of the Avellino Eruption in the 17th century BC. This powerful eruption from Mount Vesuvius caused the inhabitants to leave behind a wide range of pottery and other artefacts. The foundations of their buildings are also preserved in imprints among the mud left by the eruption.

=== Antiquity ===
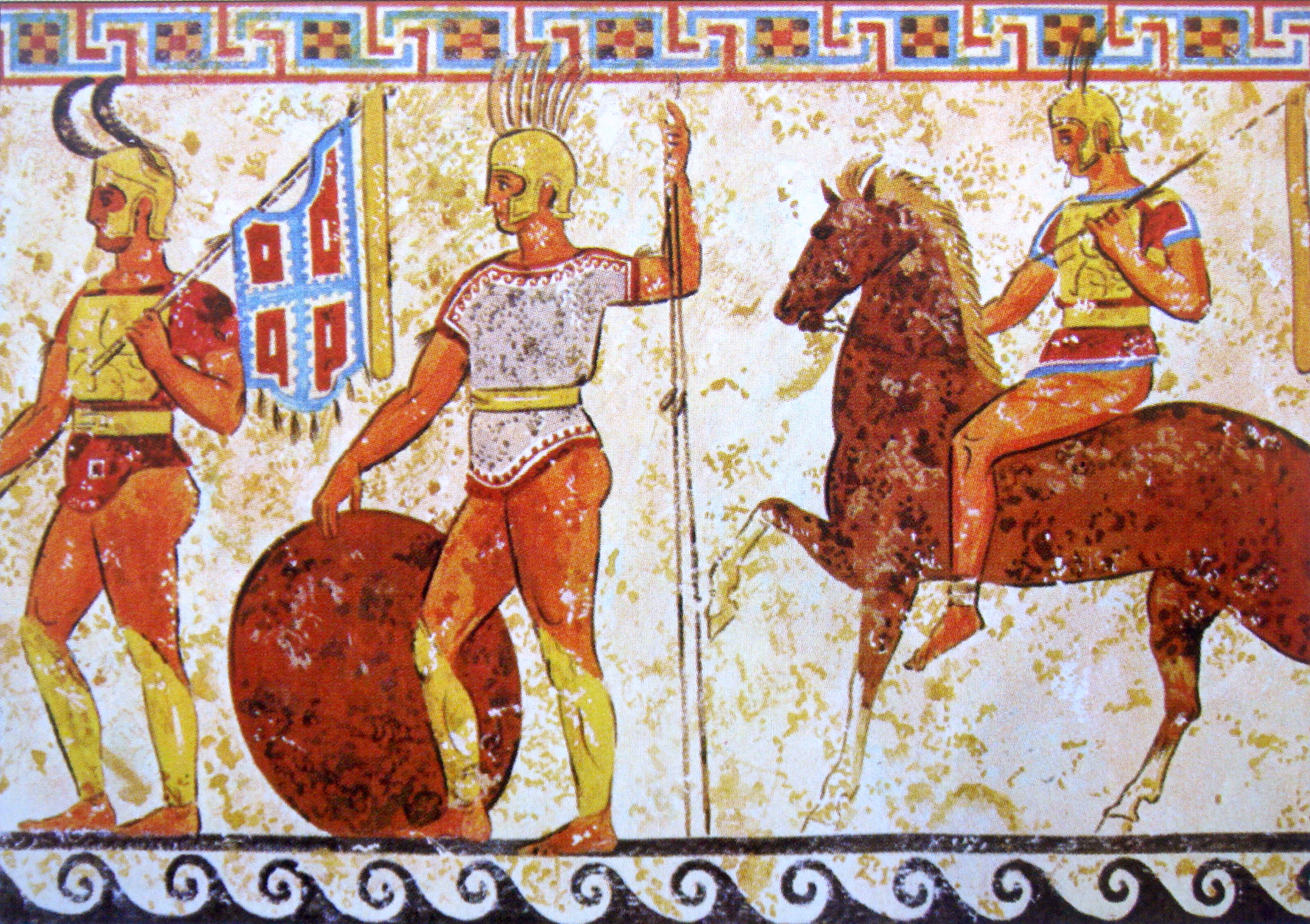
Samnite soldiers from a tomb in Nola 4th century BC

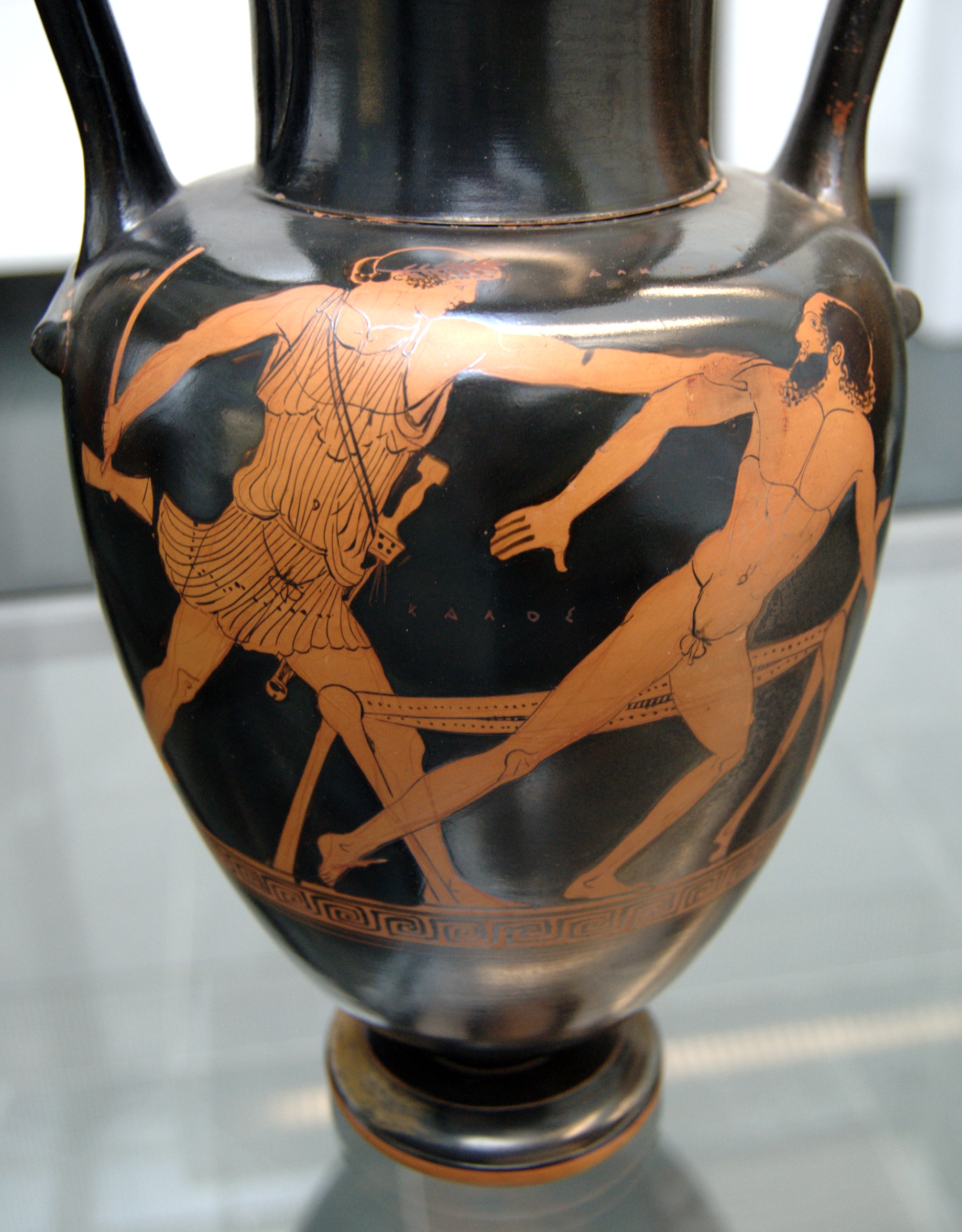
Greek vase showing Theseus and Prokroustes, from Nola 470–460 BC (Staatliche Antikensammlung, Munich)

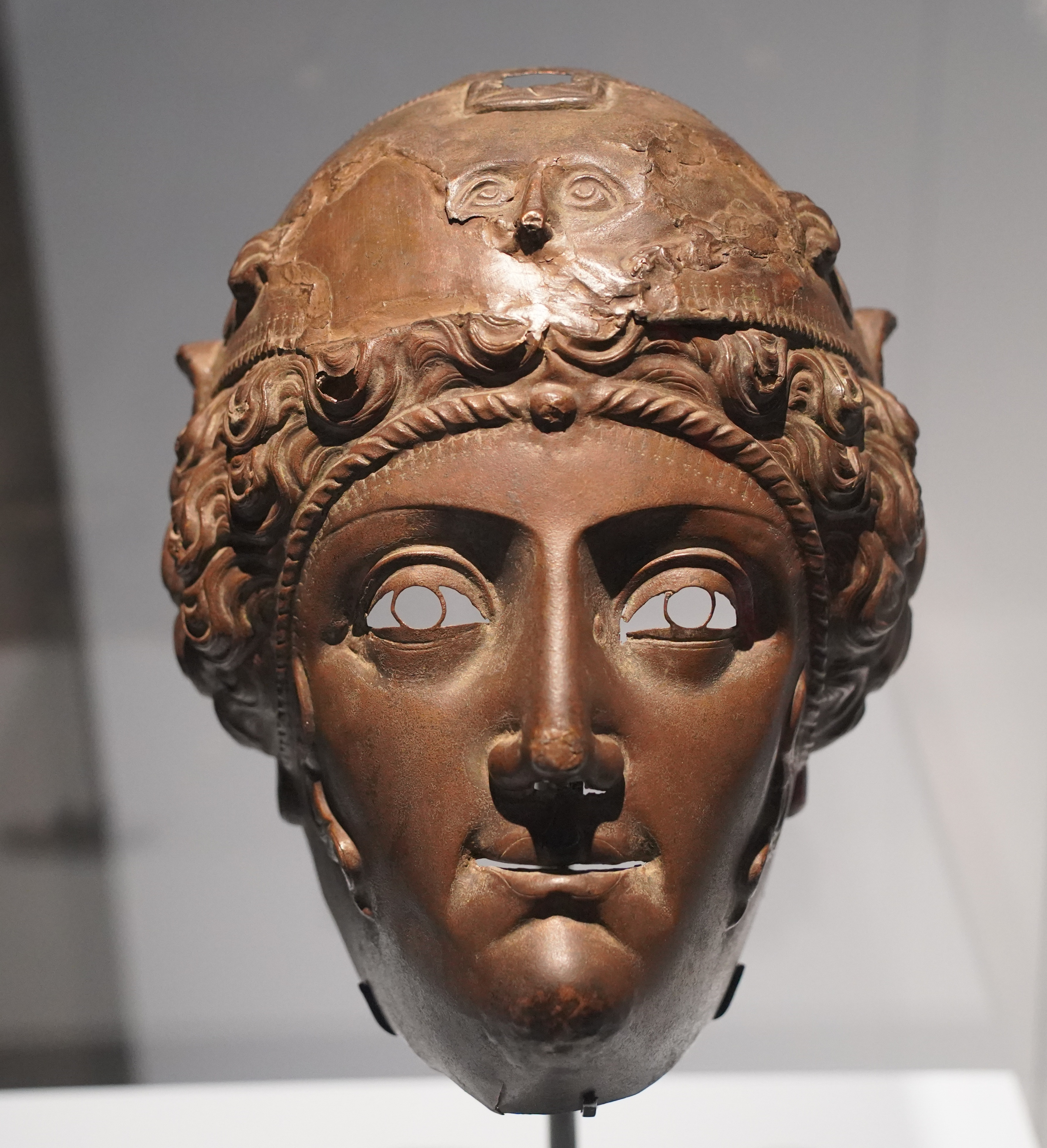
A 2nd-century bronze parade mask from a Roman tomb at Nola (British Museum)

Nola was one of the oldest cities of Campania, with its most ancient coins bearing the name Nuvlana. It was later said to have been founded by the Ausones, who were certainly occupying the city by c. 560 BC. It once vied in luxury with Capua.

During the Roman invasion of Campania in the Samnite War in 328 BC, Nola was probably occupied by the Oscans in alliance with the Samnites. Nola sent 2000 troops to defend Naples against the Romans (Paleopolis/Neapolis) in 327 BC. The Romans took Nola in 313 BC after setting fire to buildings near the city walls.

Under Roman rule during Hannibal's invasion of Italy amid the Second Punic War, the city was the site of the 1st, 2nd, and 3rd Battles of Nola. On two occasions (215 and 214 BC), it was defended by Marcellus.

In 90 BC it fell by treason to the Samnites during the Social War. In 89 BC, Sulla routed the rebel army near Pompeii, chased them to Nola and there massacred 20,000 rebels at the Battle of Nola in front of the walls, starting a ten year siege.

It was stormed in 73–72 BC by Spartacus during his failed slave revolt.

The 1st c. BC saw a number of public buildings constructed including the amphitheatre. The emperor Augustus died nearby at his sumptuous villa at Somma Vesuviana on 19 August AD 14, in allegedly the same room his father died in 72 years earlier.

Augustus and Vespasian settled colonies in the area. In the Roman road network, Nola lay between Capua and Lower Nocera on the Via Popilia. A branch road ran from it to Abella and Avellino. (Note: Mommsen asserts that roads apparently ran directly to Nola from Neapolis and Pompeii, but Heinrich Kiepert's attached map does not indicate their route.) Nola was connected to the plentiful water supply of the Serino aqueduct after 20 BC.

Though a relative backwater, Nola retained its status as a municipium, its own institutions, and the use of the Oscan language. It was divided into pagi, the names of some of which are preserved: Pagus Agrifanus, Capriculanus, Lanitanus. The discoveries of the pavement of the ancient city have not been noted with sufficient care to recover most of the plan, but a large number of Grecian vases were made at Nola, using its fine yellow clay and a shining black glaze. They are decorated with red figures.

Following the rise of Christianity, it became a bishopric. One bishop, the Christian senator Paulinus, is traditionally credited with the introduction of the use of bells to Christian worship. His small handbells were subsequently known as nolas for his seat and the larger tower bells as campanas from the surrounding area. Revered as a saint, Paulinus's relics turned the town into a site of Christian pilgrimage.

=== Middle Ages ===
Nola was sacked by Alaric in 410 and by the Vandals under Gaiseric in 453. It was captured by Manfred of Sicily in the 13th century. Under Charles of Anjou, it was held by Guy de Montfort as the County of Nola. It was inherited by his eldest daughter's Orsini husband and then held by members of their family.

=== Modern age ===
The 1460 Battle of Nola is noteworthy for the clever stratagem by which John, duke of Calabria, defeated Ferdinand, king of Naples, who fled the field with only 20 followers. Ferdinand, however, was supported by Pope Pius II, the duke of Milan, and the Albanian lord Skanderbeg. With his wife Isabella successfully wooing John's major supporters away, the king recovered his domain over the next decade. Nola itself subsequently lost its importance after its repeated destruction by earthquakes in the 15th and 16th centuries. The nearby Cicala Castle was the birthplace of Giordano Bruno (b. 1548).

In 1820, General Pepe's revolution began in Nola. The sculptor Giovanni Merliano was a native of the city; and some of his works are preserved in the cathedral.

Nola is a suburb of Naples. It is connected to the central city by a suburban railway, the Circumvesuviana. Passengers can ride direct to Napoli Porta Nolana railway station near the Porta Nolana, Napoli Centrale railway station, and stations at Pomigliano d’Arco and Baiano. Connecting trains in that system go to the tourist attractions of Pompeii and Herculaneum.

In the 1990s to the 2000s, a waste management crisis broke out in the city as a result of illegal dumping by the Camorra. Most of the waste was dumped between Nola, Acerra, and Marigliano, referred to as the "Triangle of Death". A 2004 study by Alfredo Mazza published in The Lancet Oncology revealed that deaths by cancer in the area are much higher than the European average.

== Sights ==
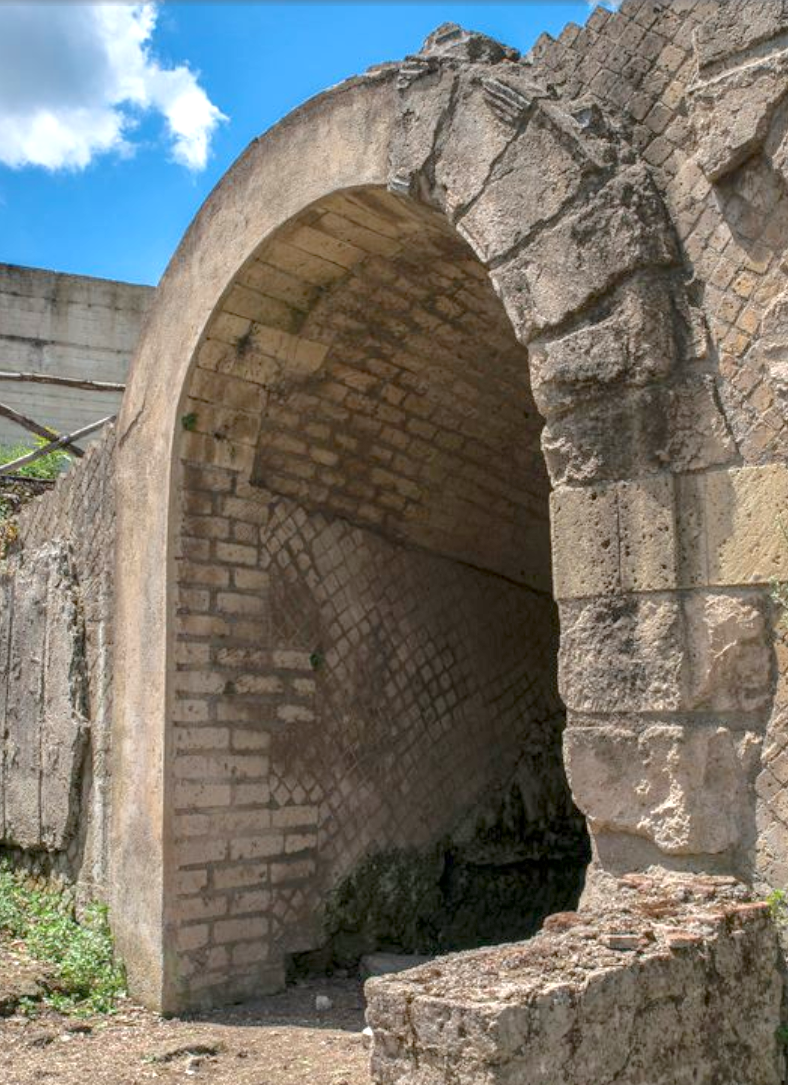
Nola amphitheatre

- St Thomas's (Basilica di San Tommaso; built in the 3rd century, decorated with frescoes 9–11th century, later renovated)

Other Roman ruins, including a temple to Augustus, survived as long as the 16th century, they were then plundered for building material and few signs remain. A few tombs are preserved, and results from excavations are displayed at the Archaeological Museum. Other sites include:

- Nola Cathedral: a Gothic church (rebuilt in 1593, and again starting 1866)
- Old Cathedral (Basilica of SS Apostoli; according to tradition, first built AD 95, rebuilt 1190, reduced 1593, renovated in the Baroque style 1740s)
- Palazzo Orsini; first built in 1470, later modified and renovated
- San Biago's, a late-Renaissance church decorated with polychrome marble and 17th-century Neapolitan paintings
- Seminario Vescovile Nola, the local seminary, which preserves the Cippus Abellanus Oscan inscriptions
- Cicala Castle
- Giordano Bruno monument
- History and Archaeology Museum of Nola

=== Roman amphitheatre ===
The passion for gladiatorial combat was at its strongest in Campania among the locals and also the army veterans. So a permanent building for these was erected, as elsewhere, in the 1st c. BC, holding 20,000 spectators. The site was just inside the northern walls where existing buildings were demolished and one side of the arena took advantage of the wall embankment. The podium was faced with sheets of white marble elaborately carved with scenes and finished at the top with a balustrade with the same stone.

It was partially rebuilt and renovated over the centuries, maybe after earthquakes. By the end of the 5th century it was abandoned and used as a quarry. The eruption of Vesuvius in the early 6th century and the subsequent flood partially buried the building and saved some of it for posterity, including marble in the process of being carried away.

== Notable people ==
- Gaius Octavius (about 100 – 59 BC), politician and father of the Roman emperor Augustus
- Augustus (63 BC – AD 14), founder of the Roman Empire, died at Nola.
- St Felix of Nola (died. ca. AD 260) a Christian presbyter
- St Paulinus of Nola (ca. 354 – 431 AD), senator, bishop, and theologian.
- Guy de Montfort, Count of Nola (1244–1291), son of Simon de Montfort, 6th Earl of Leicester and Eleanor of England.
- Giovanni Merliano (1478–1559), sculptor and architect, whose work is well represented in the cathedral
- Luigi Tansillo (1510–1568), poet of the Petrarchian school.
- Nicola Antonio Stigliola (1546–1623), philosopher, printer, architect and medical doctor.
- Giordano Bruno (1548–1600), philosopher, mathematician and poet who referred to himself as the Nolano and his work as Nolana filosofia.
- Nicola Napolitano (1838–1863), brigand
- Pasquale Russo (born 1947), Camorra boss and founder of the Russo clan
- Salvatore Russo (born 1958), camorrista and boss of the Russo clan

== Culture ==
Two fairs are held in Nola: one on 22 June and another on 15 November. The Festival of the Lilies (Festa dei Gigli) is held on the Sunday after 22 June, honouring St Paulinus. Eight lilies and a boat are made of wood and covered with papier-mache from the city's art shops. On the last day of the festival, the huge lilies are carried through the town on residents' shoulders along a route that has been followed for more than a thousand years. Each represents one of the local guilds or corporations, coming in the following order:

- Greengrocers (Ortolano)
- Butchers of pigs (Salumiere)
- Innkeepers (Bettoliere)
- Bakers (Panettiere)
- St Paulinus' Boat (Barca)
- Butchers of other meats (Beccaio)
- Shoemakers (Calzolaio)
- Smiths (Fabbro)
- Dressmakers (Sarto)

In 2013 it was nominated as UNESCO Intangible Cultural Heritage. It is possible that the design of the gigli may have influenced the design of the Watts Towers.

== Twin towns – sister cities ==
Nola is twinned with:

- Sutera (CL), Italy

== See also ==
- Vulcano Buono
