= Nola-Croce del Papa =

Bronze Age archaeological site in Campania, Italy

Nola-Croce del Papa was an early Bronze Age village discovered in May 2001 in the Campania region near Nola, Italy. The excavation was directed by French archaeologist Claude Albore Livadie, who described the settlement as the "first Pompeii".

== Discovery ==
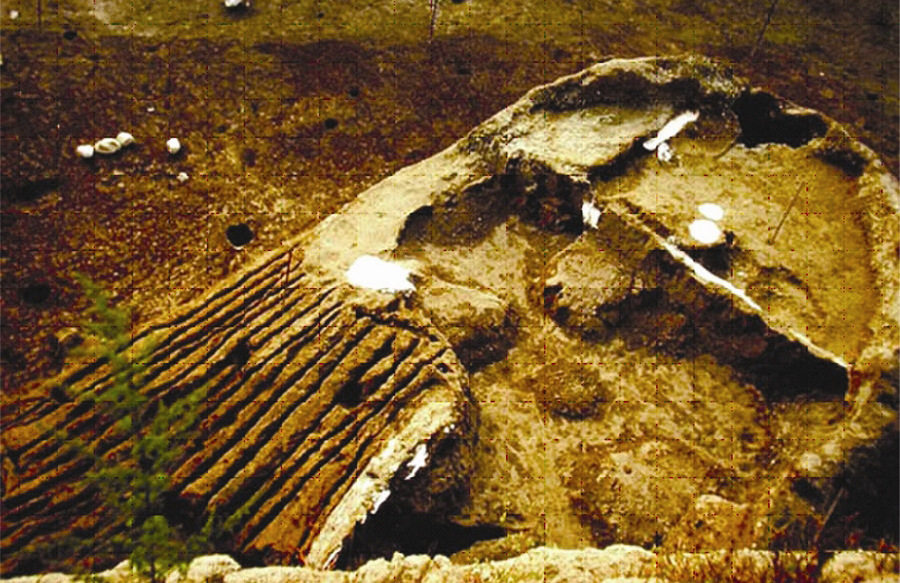

Archaeologists found the lost settlement after discovering the bodies of two people that had been caught by pyroclastic flow as they were fleeing the eruption of Mount Vesuvius. The eruption, which took place in the 2nd millennium BCE, covered the village in volcanic ash. The remains of livestock such as goats were found, and various fossils were also found as mud had flowed into the structures and preserved various foodstuffs and plants.

== Findings ==
Of the entire settlement only three structures remained intact after the eruption. No human remains have been found in the settlement, leading archaeologists to believe its populace escaped, although not all made it to safety. The lack of personal belongings in the settlement also led to the belief that the people were given enough time to gather their most precious belongings before leaving.

== See also ==
- Avellino eruption
