= Avellino eruption =

Plinian eruption of the Somma-Vesuvius complex

Avellino Eruption
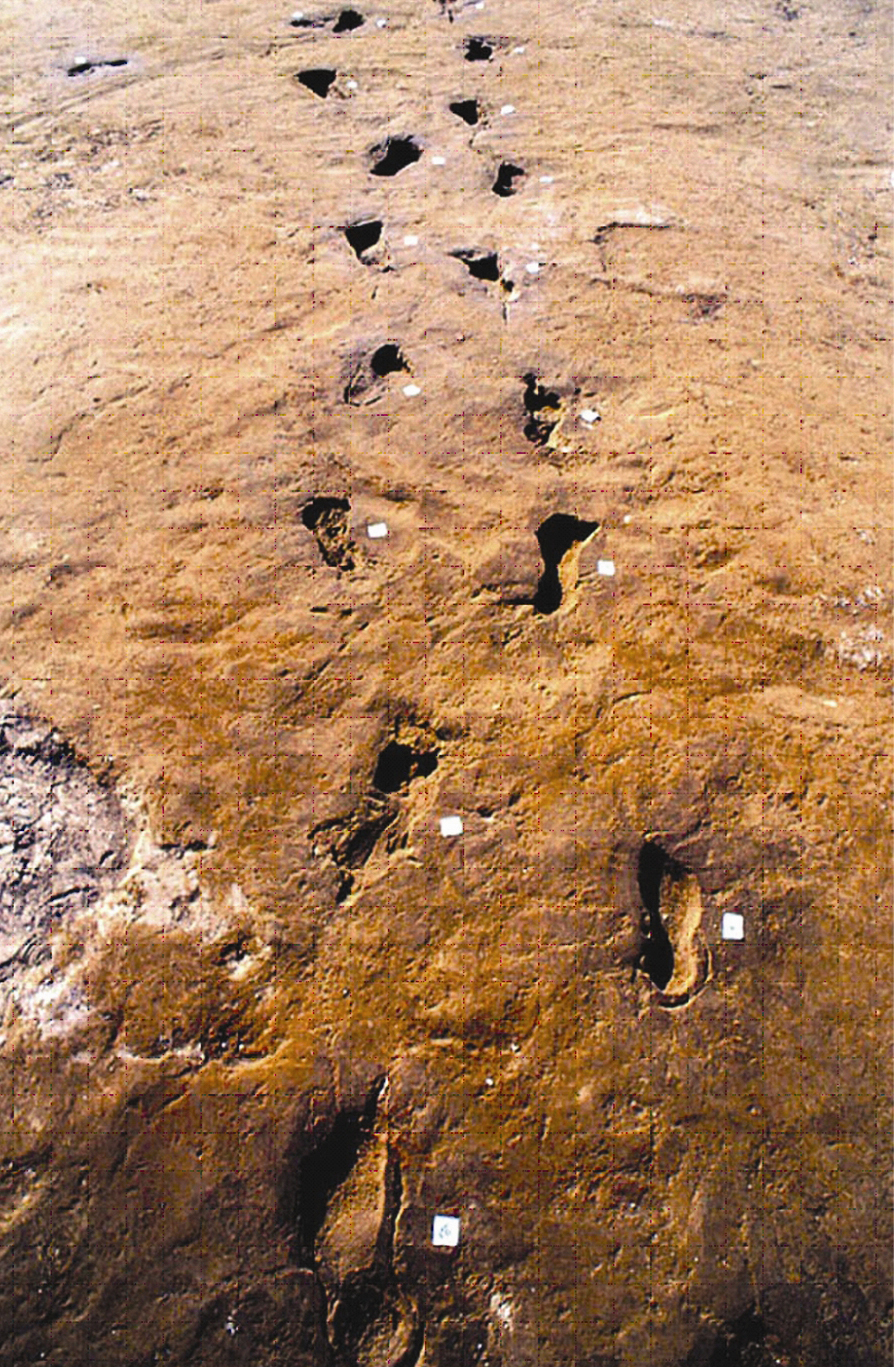
- Thousands of footprints in the pyroclastic surge deposits of the Avellino eruption testify to an en masse exodus from the disaster zone. Photo credits: Pier Paolo Petrone, University Federico II of Naples, Italy
- Volcano: Mount Vesuvius
- Date: c. 1995 BC
- Type: Ultra-Plinian
- Location: Naples, Campania, Italy; 40°49′N 14°24′E
- VEI: 6
- Impact: Devastated and preserved Italian Bronze Age settlements within and throughout the area

Maps
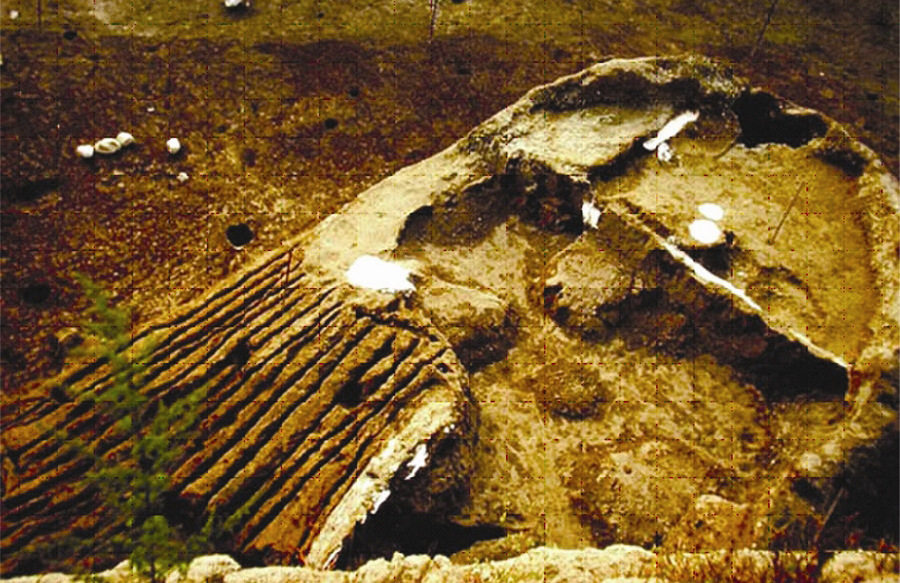
- Hut at the site of the village

The Avellino eruption of Mount Vesuvius occurred c. 1995 BC. It is estimated to have had a VEI of 6, making it larger and more catastrophic than Vesuvius's more famous and well-documented 79 AD eruption. It is the source of the Avellino pumice (Italian: Pomici di Avellino) deposits extensively found in the comune of Avellino in Campania.

== Characteristics of the eruption ==
The "assessment of volcanological factors" in one scientific study reconstructs a minimum eruption time of 3 hours in which an initial explosion raised a column of ash 23 km (75,000 ft) and deposited about 0.32 km^{3} of white pumice ("the white pumice phase"), while a second, more intense explosion raised a column to 31 km (102,000 ft) depositing 1.25 km^{3} of grey pumice ("the grey pumice phase"). These pumices appearing in Apulian pottery can be used to establish the relative chronology of pottery phases.

A 2008 study of the lithofacies (deposits from the eruption) distinguishes three phases. Pyroclastic flows (PDC's) of Phases 1 and 2 were generated by "magmatic fragmentation" and had "small dispersal areas" mainly on the slopes of Vesuvius. Phase 3 was created by "phreatomagmatic fragmentation," in which clastic fragments are driven by superheated steam from ground water mixed with the other gases released from the magma. The authors characterize Phase 3 as "the most voluminous and widespread in the whole of Somma–Vesuvius's eruptive history." Some facies a few cm thick were found 25 km (16 mi) from the source. The vent was 2 km (1.2 mi) west of today's center.

The overall results of the Avellino eruption were catastrophic and widespread. The deposit thickness of ash and other eruptive material ranges from 15m close to the vent to 50 cm around Avellino, and creating a subaquaeous debris-flow in the bay of Naples.

== Date of the eruption ==
The date of the Avellino eruption remains to be determined with a precision greater than about 500 years within the framework of the Early/Middle Bronze Age. A range of 2000–1500 BC includes the great majority of estimates. Ample opportunity to obtain Carbon-14 dates from charcoal and soil buried under the deposits has existed and still exists. Sporadic radiocarbon dating continues, with each scientist claiming to have obtained "the latest". Consistency with previous and subsequent work remains elusive. Since a real and very precise calendar date of the eruption must have existed, variation in estimations can only be the result of limitations to the carbon-dating method, which, given a plenitude of reliably emplaced samples, can only produce a date within a window of roughly 500 years in a maximum elapsed time of roughly 4000 years or 1/8 (12.5%).

According to Giardino, the problem of establishing a reliable date results from the differences of calibration – organic samples (such as charcoal: 1880–1680 BC) versus soil facies (1684–1535 BC). He prefers the earlier as the more reliable date. The Avellino Eruption separates archaeologically the Early Bronze Age in Campania from the Middle Bronze Age.

A study published in 1990 by Vogel and others suggested that the Avellino eruption partly caused the climatic disturbances of the 1620s BC, dates verified by tree-ring series and ice-core layers. The authors had just obtained carbon dates of 3360±40 BP, or 1617–1703 calibrated BC. They were suggesting a coincidence of a number of eruptions, such as the Minoan eruption on Santorini. The hypothesis remains unverifiable a generation later, due to the overall imprecision of the dates.

== The Nola bronze-age village ==
The eruption destroyed several Bronze Age settlements. The remarkably well-preserved remains of one were discovered in May 2001 at Croce del Papa near Nola by French and Italian archaeologists, with huts, pots, livestock and even the footprints of animals and people, as well as skeletons. The residents had hastily abandoned the village, leaving it to be buried under pumice and ash in much the same way Pompeii was later preserved.

== See also ==
- Mount Vesuvius topics

== Bibliography ==
- Giardino, Claudio (2005). "The Island of Capri in the Gulf of Naples between the 5th and the 2nd Millennium BC". In Attema, Peter; Nijboer, Albert; Zifferero, Andrea (eds.). Papers in Italian Archaeology VI: Communities and Settlements from the Neolithic to the Early Medieval Period: Proceedings of the 6th Conference of Italian Archaeology held at the University of Groningen, Groningen Institute of Archaeology, the Netherlands, April 15–17, 2003 (PDF). BAR International Series 1452 (II). Vol. II. Oxford: Archaeopress. pp. 625–632. Archived from the original (PDF) on 2016-03-03.
- Giuseppe Mastrolorenzo, Pierpaolo Petrone, Lucia Pappalardo and Michael F. Sheridan, The Avellino 3780-yr-B.P. Catastrophe as a Worst-Case Scenario for a Future Eruption at Vesuvius. Proceedings of the National Academy of Sciences of the United States of America Vol. 103, No. 12 (Mar. 21, 2006), pp. 4366–4370
