= Palazzo Orsini, Nola =

Palace in Nola, Italy

Palazzo Orsini
- Interactive map of the Palazzo Orsini area

General information
- Architectural style: Renaissance
- Location: Nola, Campania, Italy
- Coordinates: 40°55′35.5″N 14°31′31.9″E
- Completed: 1461

The Palazzo Orsini, also known as Reggia Orsini, is a 15th-century palace located on Piazza Giordano Bruno in Nola, Italy. It houses the city's courthouse.

== History ==
The palace was built in 1461 by Orso Orsini. Originally serving as the residence of the counts Orsini, it has undergone various transformations over the centuries. In 1559, it became property of the Jesuits. Later, it was used for military purposes and served as the headquarters of the Military District from 1860.

In 1994, it assumed its current judicial function.

== Description ==
The palace is located next to the church of Gesù and extends across three floors, each originally designed for different functions: the noble floor for the residence of the counts, the ground floor for services and stables, and the top floor for the servants. Its style is Renaissance, characterized by a simple marble façade decorated with a carved portal and a Latin inscription. The building has a square plan with an internal courtyard and a garden. Inside, notable architectural elements include the vaulted entrance hall and a staircase with piperno steps.
