= Battle of Nola (216 BC) =

216 BC battle of the Second Punic War

First Battle of Nola
- Part of the Second Punic War
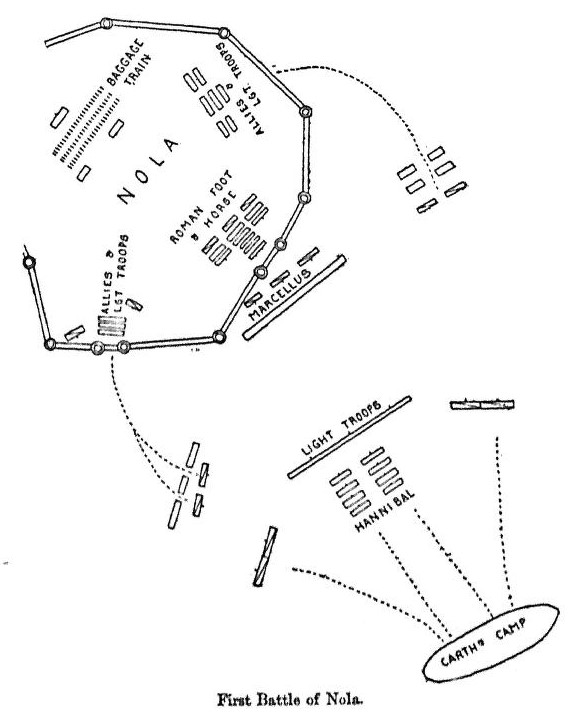
- Plan of the first battle of Nola
Date	Late 216 BC
Location	Nola, present-day Italy 40.9261°N 14.5275°E
Result	Minor Roman Victory See Aftermath section

Belligerents
Carthage	Roman Republic

Commanders and leaders
Hannibal	Marcus Claudius Marcellus

The First Battle of Nola was fought in 216 BC between the forces of Hannibal and a Roman force led by Marcus Claudius Marcellus. Hannibal was attempting to seize the town of Nola: He failed to do so, and would make two more unsuccessful attempts on the city over the next two years.

Hannibal moved to capture the city of Nola due to some leaders in the city offering to open their gates to him. A Roman force under the command of Marcellus arrived before Hannibal and was able to enter the city. Hannibal camped near the city, and daily skirmishes took place between the two armies. Marcellus learnt that the only support he enjoyed was the senators in the city. Marcellus took action to prevent betrayal by undermining the pro-Hannibal faction in the city. Marcellus learnt that some leaders in the city had been conspiring with Hannibal, and he discovered that should he make any sortie from the town or draw up for battle outside, they planned on plundering the baggage and closing the gates behind him. After this, Marcellus decided his situation was not sustainable.

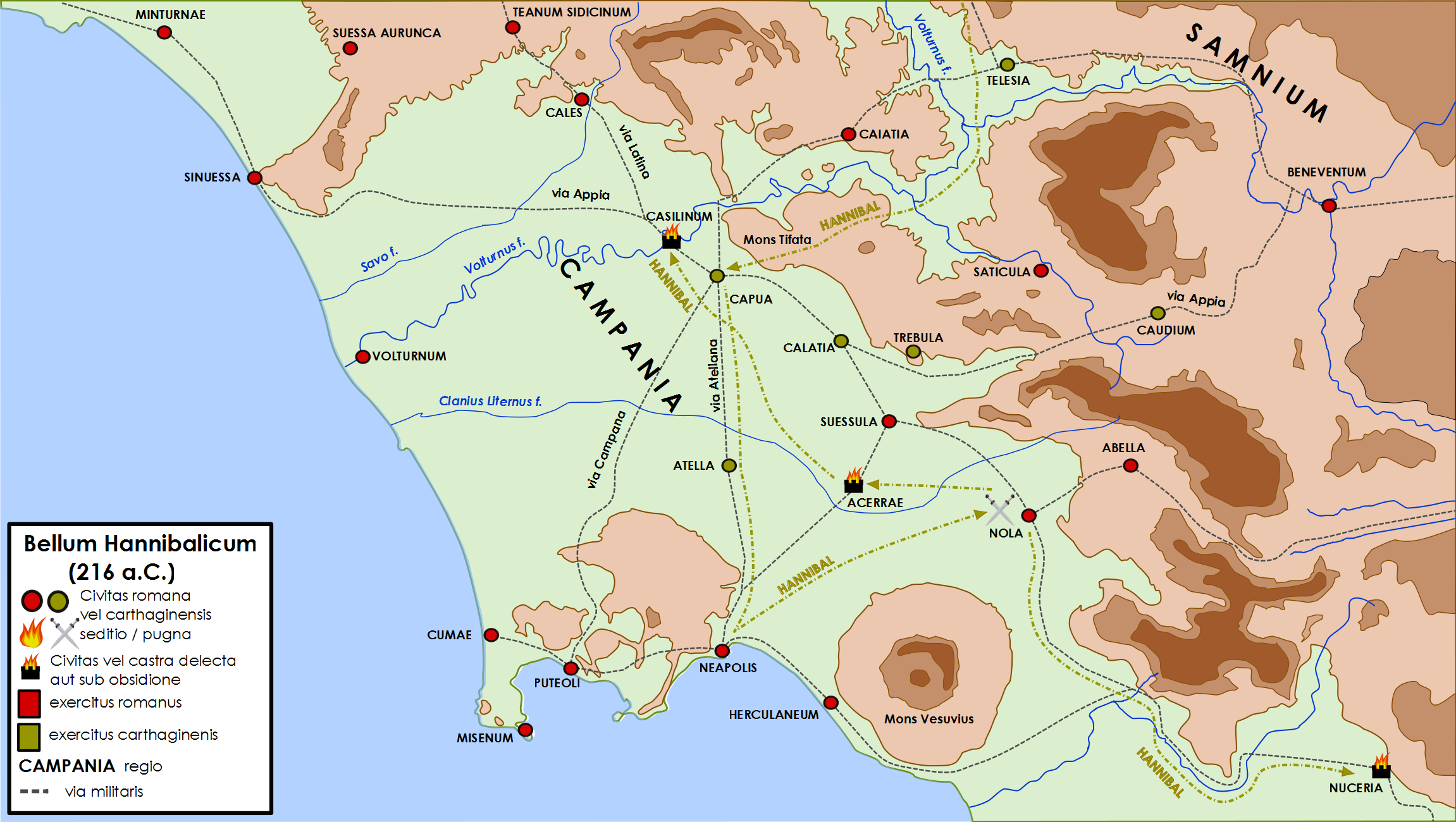
Map of the 216 BC Nola campaign

He took action to protect himself from a revolt, pulled his troops from the walls, and secretly organized them behind the gates. Hannibal drew up his men in battle order in anticipation of an attack or at least another skirmish. When nothing happened, Hannibal concluded that Marcellus had uncovered his plan and would not dare attempt a sortie with the threat of betrayal. Confident of this, he marched his soldiers forward to attempt an assault on the central gate. The Carthaginian forces approached with ladders and machines useful for an assault. When they did this, Marcellus sprang his trap and ordered his forces to charge out of the gates and personally lead the centre. Hannibal's troops found themselves caught off guard. Hannibal made attempts to change the tide of the ensuing battle; however, when the second line of the Roman troops charged from the gates, it became clear he couldn't win the battle. After sustaining heavy losses, Hannibal ordered a phased retreat from the field to save his army from further losses. Hannibal gave up hope of capturing Nola and withdrew to a camp near Acerræ. The victory, while not decisive enough to end Hannibal's fighting potential, was a boost to Roman morale.

== Aftermath ==
Theodore Ayrault Dodge in 1891 and Ernle Bradford in 1981 called the battle a Roman victory. Hans Delbrück in 1920 described the three battles of Nola as Marcellus' alleged victories and very insignificant engagements.

== See also ==
- Battle of Nola (215 BC) – 215 BC battle of the Second Punic War
- Battle of Nola (214 BC) – 214 BC battle of the Second Punic War

=== Sources ===
- Delbrück, Hans (1990) [1920]. History of the Art of War Volume I: Warfare in Antiquity [Geschichte der kriegskunst im Rahmen der politischen Geschichte]. Translated by Renfroe Jr., Walter J. Lincoln, Neb.: University of Nebraska Press/ Bison Book. ISBN 978-0-8032-9199-7.
