= Villa of Augustus =

Ancient Roman villa

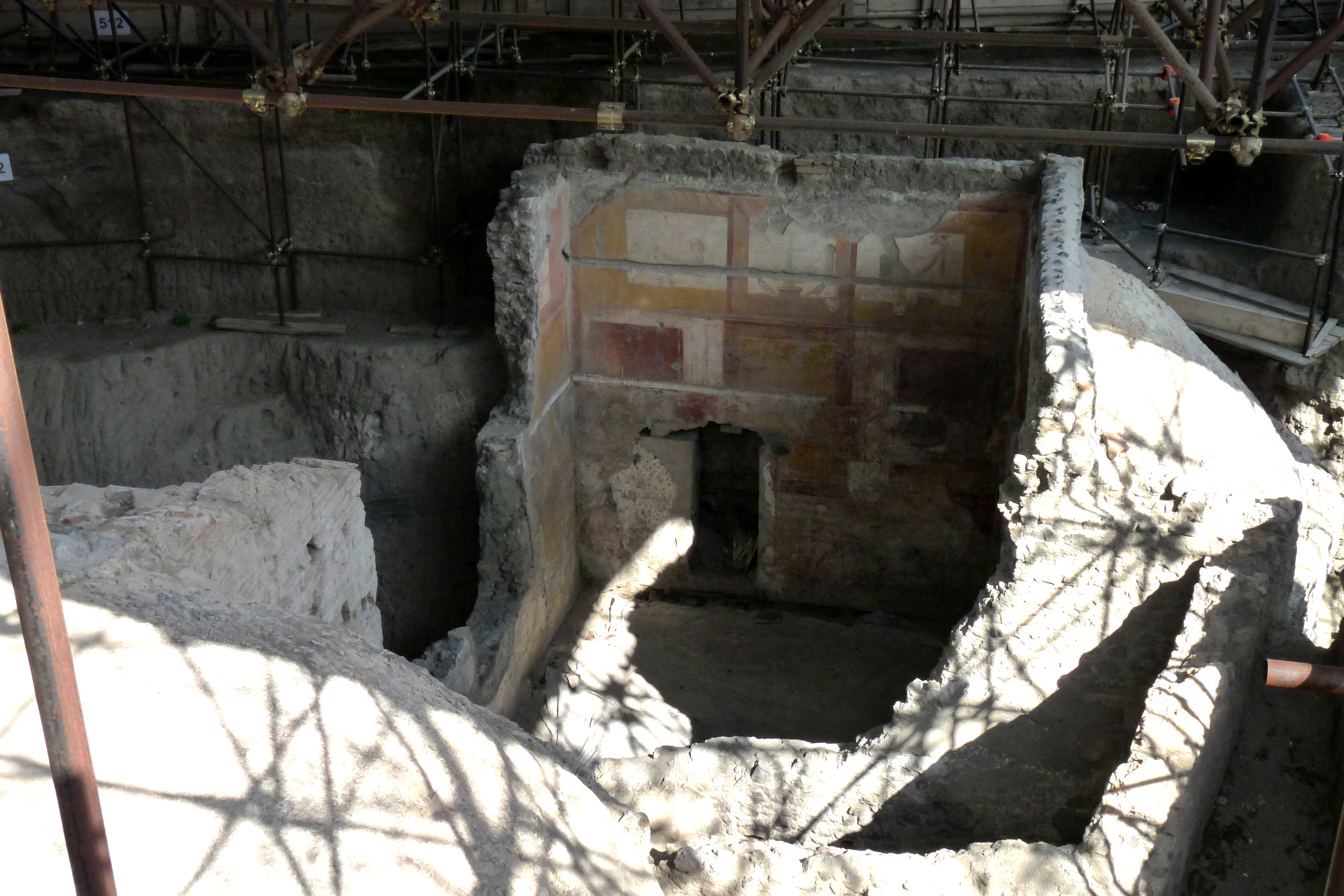
- The latter villa, constructed after 79 AD
- Interactive map of Villa of Augustus
- 40°52′33″N 14°25′27″E
- Type: Villa
- Location: Somma Vesuviana

The so-called Villa of Augustus (Latin: Villa Augustae) is an ancient Roman villa in Somma Vesuviana that may have been owned by Augustus, the first emperor of Rome.

In April 2024, archaeologists from the University of Tokyo claimed to have discovered the possible identity of the villa after excavations that started in 2002.

== Background ==
In Roman times the area was a resort for rich patricians who built villas there.

Near the end of his life, Augustus travelled to his villa "in Nola" (which is about 8 km from the villa). According to Tacitus and Suetonius, Augustus died on August 19 AD 14 in his villa, with Suetonius claiming he died in the same room in which his father had died. Following Augustus's death at the villa, his body was carried in procession from Nola.

The area was finally buried and preserved during the eruption of Vesuvius in 472 AD, but the Eruption of Mount Vesuvius in 79 (which buried Pompeii etc.) had previously buried and damaged the earlier villa over which the later villa was built.

== Description ==
The vast Roman villa had been modified several times after its construction.

The later villa was built in the late first century AD, as shown by brick stamps, over the earlier buried villa using its walls as foundations. By the mid-2nd century AD it had a monumental entrance, and a grand hall with brick arches, columns and marble statues, and included audience halls for visitors. A 12 m-long colonnade with arches was connected to a wall with three niches. Decorations included marble columns and capitals, mosaic floors, splendid fragments of statues depicting people with sumptuous robes, polychrome frescoes and coffered ceilings.

It had an upper and lower terrace with rooms on each floor, in one of which two marble statues, including one of Dionysus, were discovered. Around the 4th century the villa was made into a large-scale winery. One room was later divided into two parts for food storage and a stable.

In the earlier villa which could have been that of Augustus, sixteen wine amphorae were discovered, along with a warehouse and a furnace, which is believed to have heated baths.

== Excavation history ==
The villa was first rediscovered in the 1890s during agricultural work. After years of inactivity with the villa, excavation of it began in 1929 and continued until 1935.

In 2002, archeology sponsored by the University of Tokyo was resumed and in April 2024 they announced it as the villa where Augustus may have died.

The earlier villa was discovered beneath the remains of the later villa previously excavated in the 1930s. Using radiocarbon dating and chemical analysis of the volcanic layers, it was determined that the earlier villa predated the eruption of Mount Vesuvius in AD 79 and thus could be the location where Augustus died.

More recent excavations in 2015 have revealed a massive water cistern for irrigation of farmland from the 4th century.

== Gallery ==
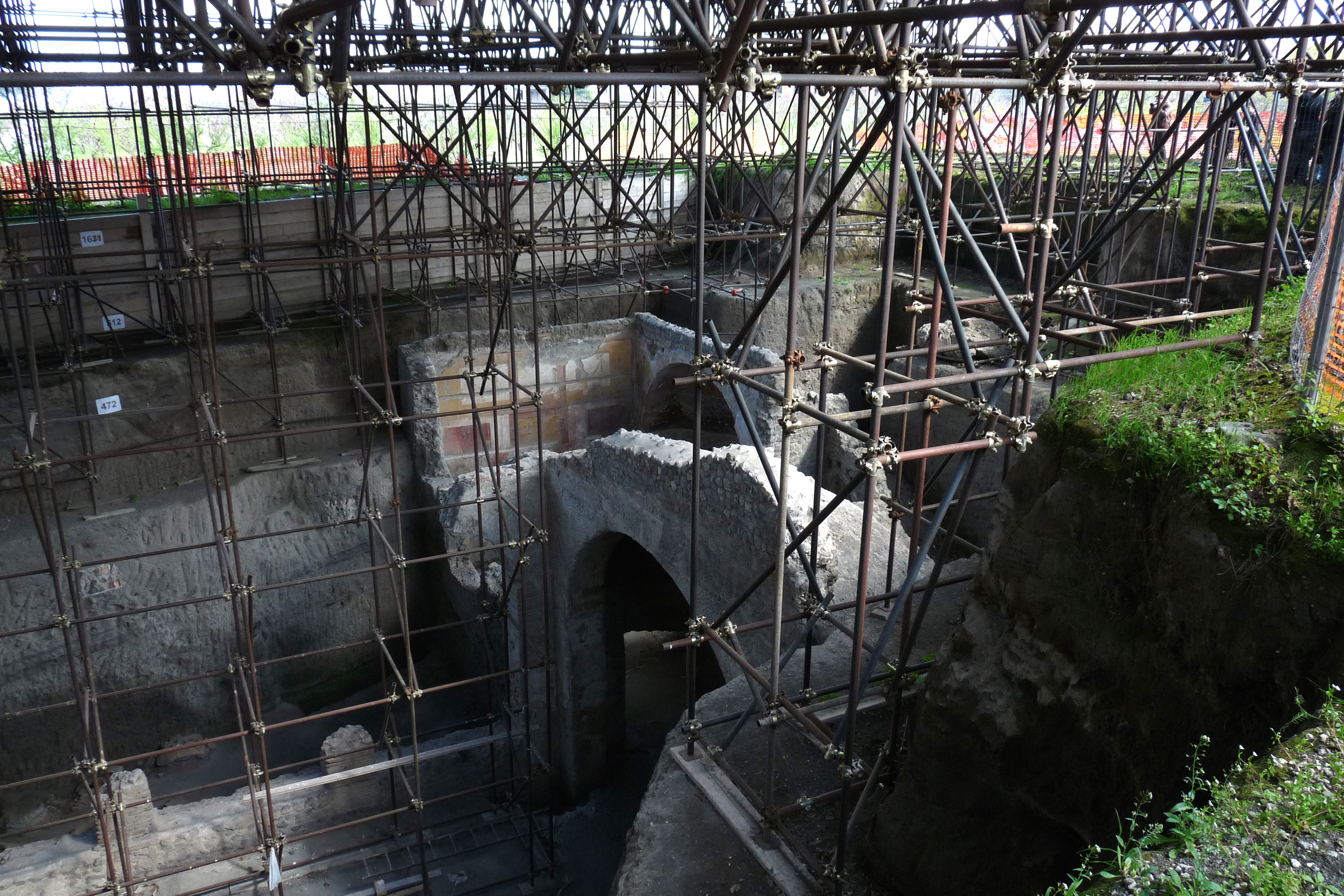

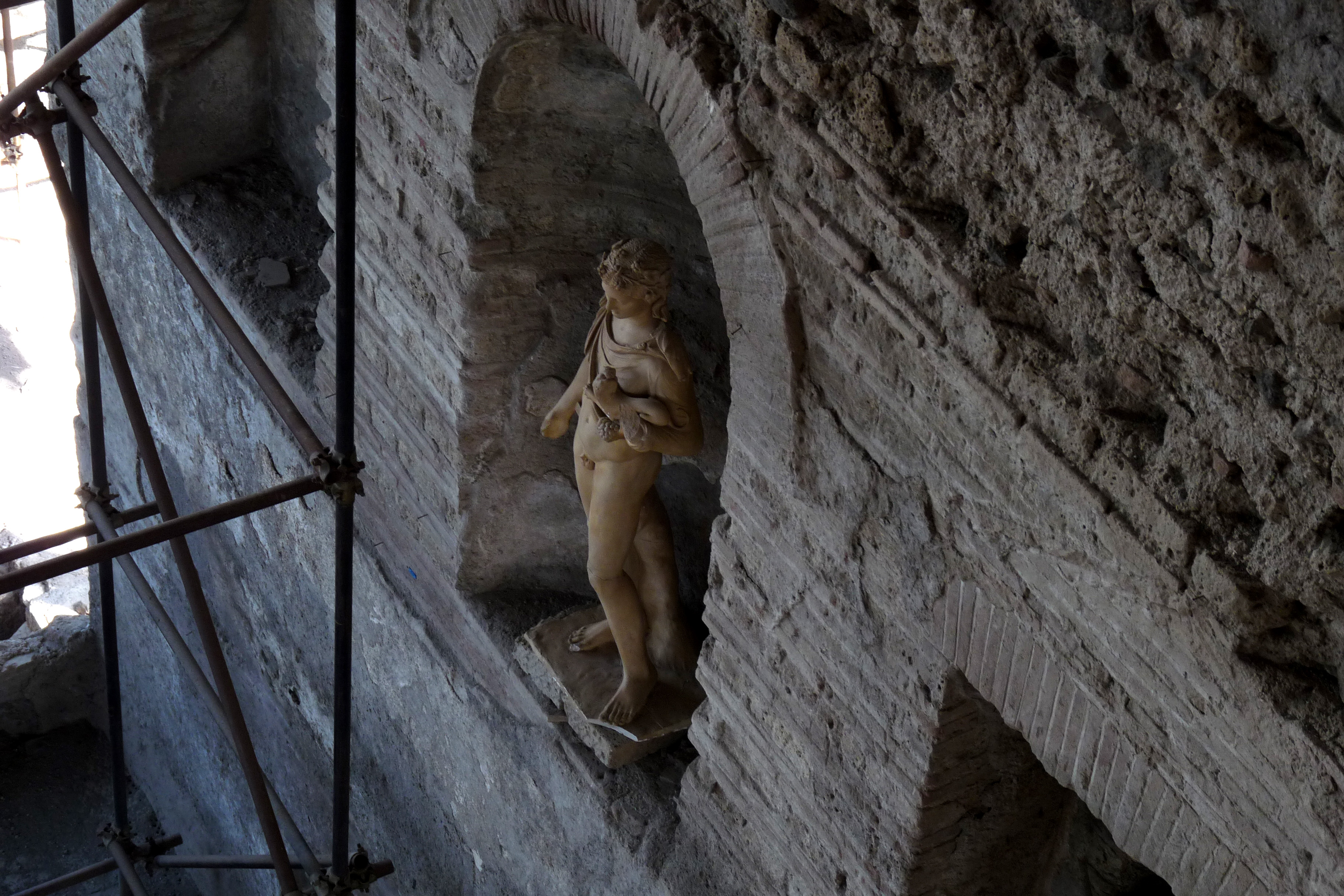

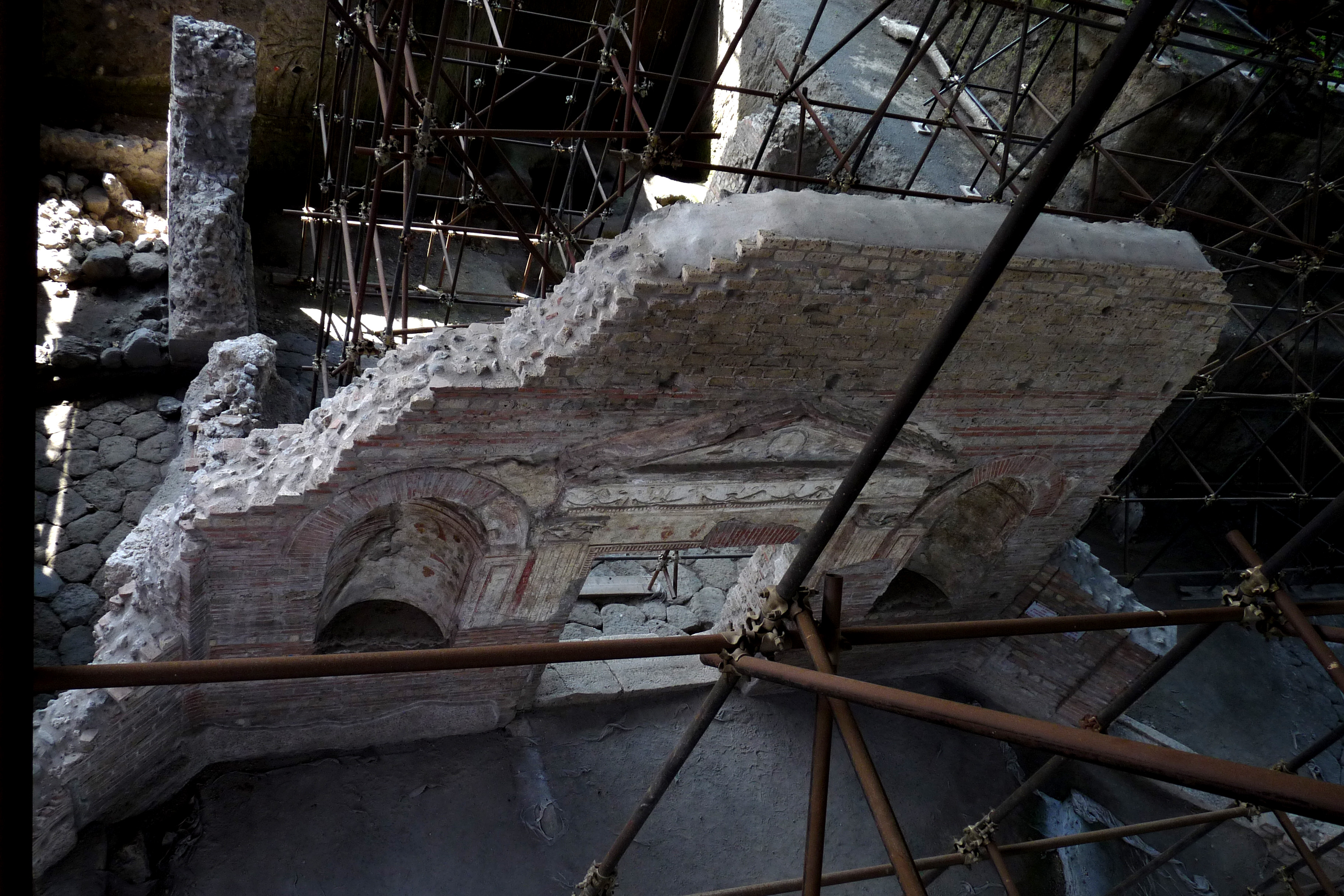

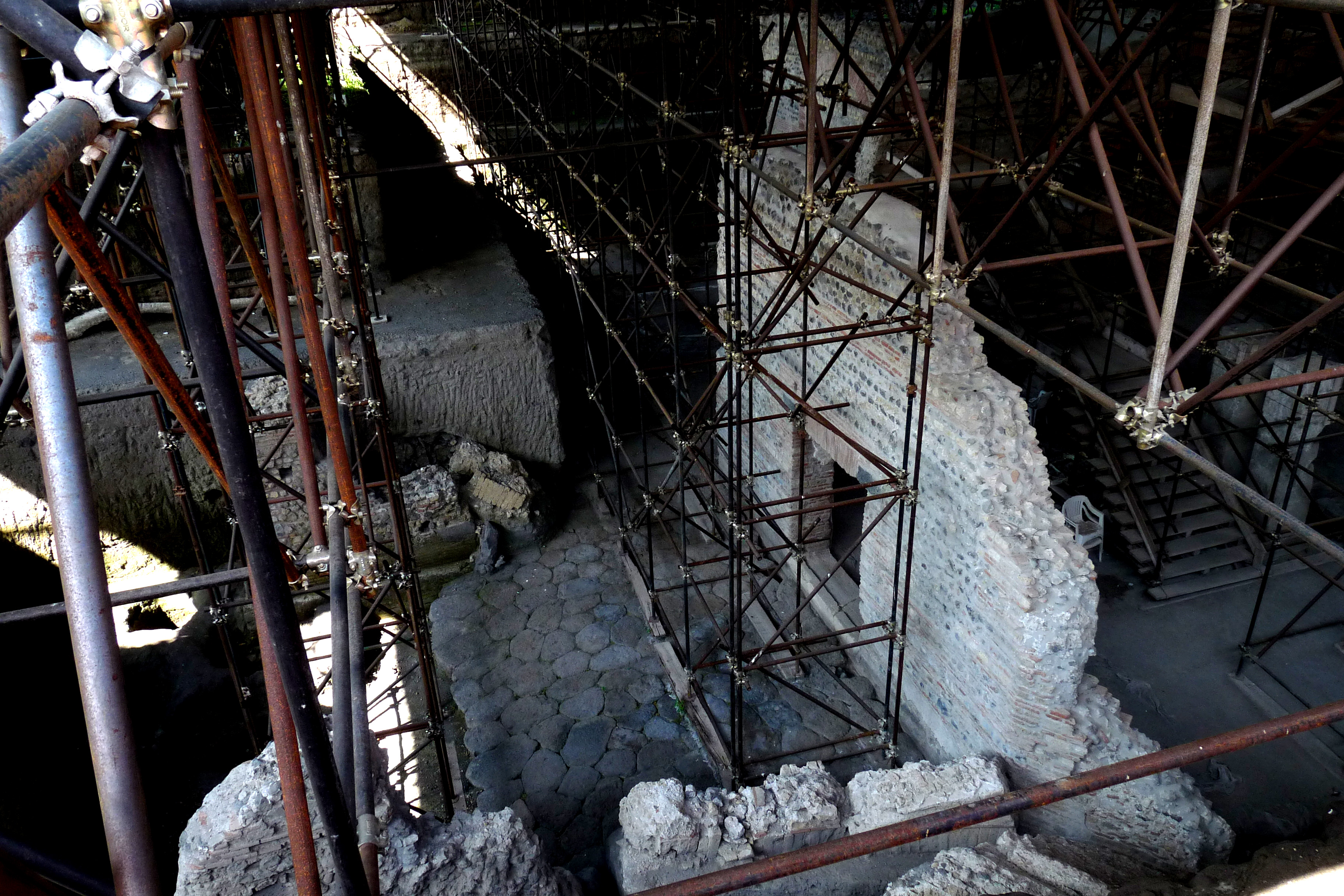

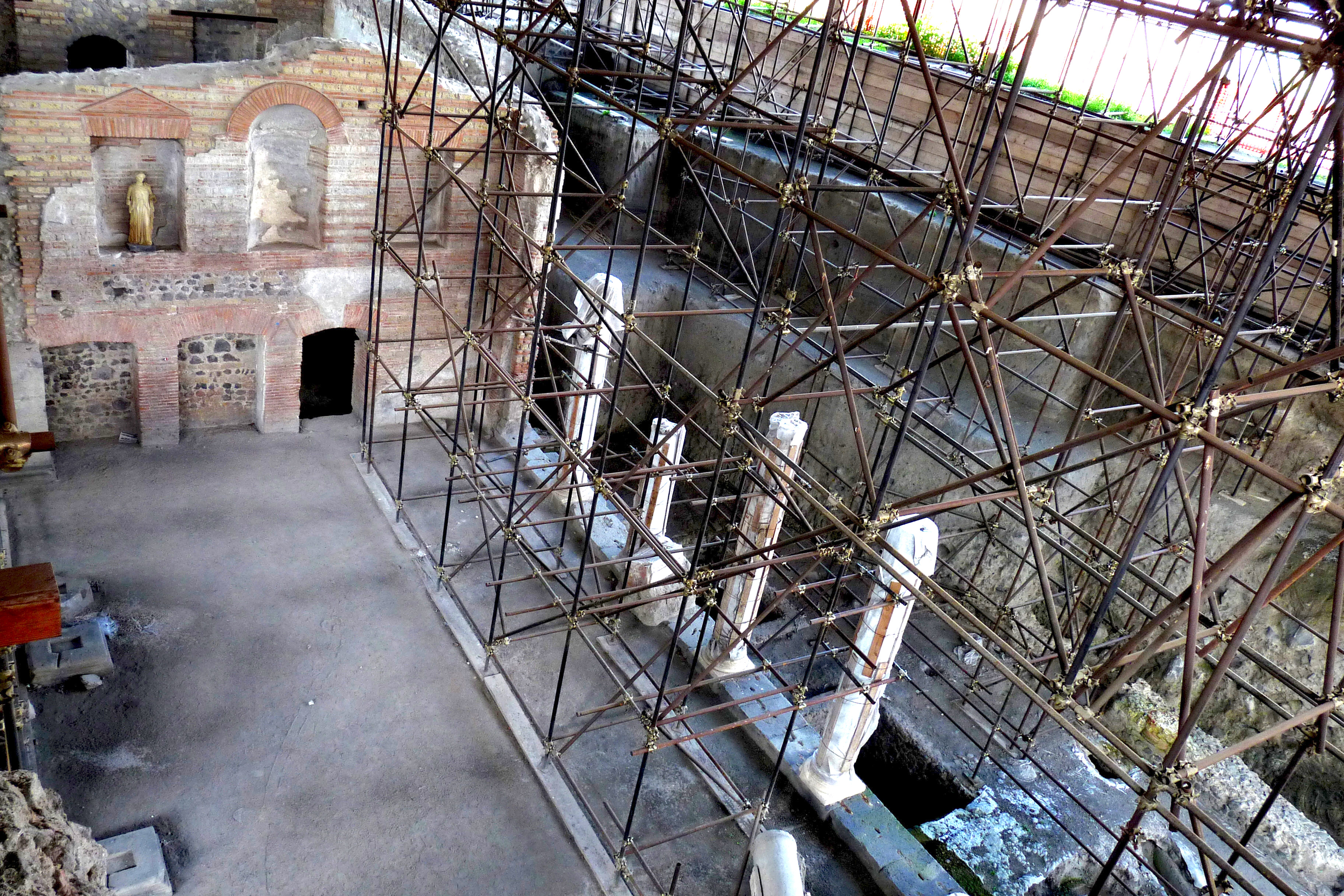

== Bibliography ==
=== Ancient sources ===
- Tacitus. Annales.
- Suetonius. Life of Augustus. The Twelve Caesars.
