= Mario Cartaro =

Italian engraver

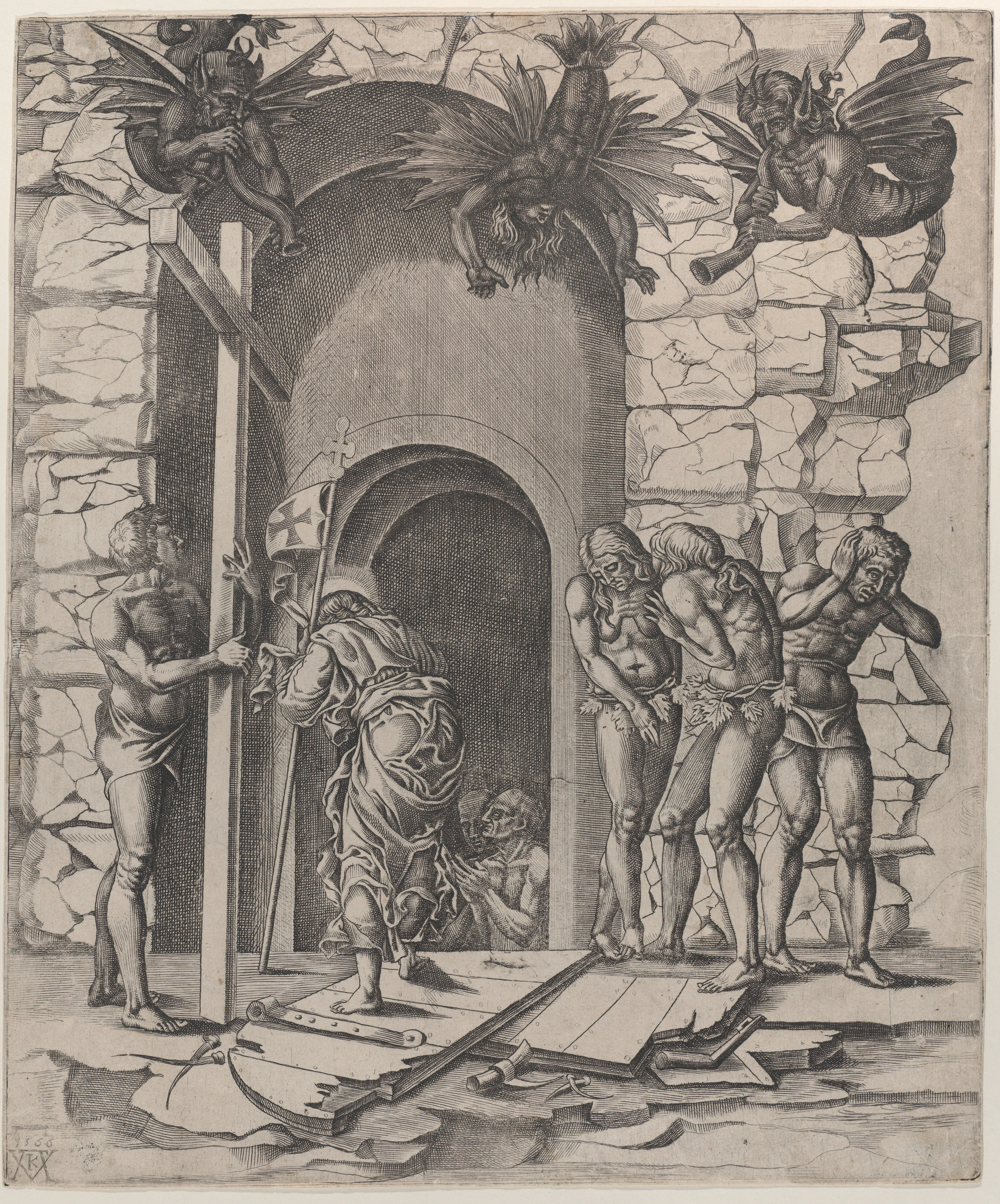
- Christ descending into Limbo, Metropolitan Museum of Art, New York
- Born: c. 1540; Viterbo, Papal States
- Died: 16 April 1620 (aged 79–80); Naples, Kingdom of Italy
- Known for: Engraving
- Movement: Renaissance

Mario Cartaro (c. 1540 – 16 April 1620) was an engraver, draftsman, and print merchant. Active in Rome since 1560, he became famous as an engraver of works by various artists, views of the city, and – principally – maps.

== Biography ==
Cartaro was sometimes believed to be of northern European origin, since he used the signature "Kartarius" as well as "Cartarius". However, his 1579 Map of Rome is signed "Marius Kartarius Viterbensis," indicating that he came from Viterbo. He was in Rome by 1560, the date of his first known engraving, the Adoration of the Shepherds, after Heinrich Aldegrever. Bartsch recorded 28 prints by him, to which Passavant added a further 27. Mainly engravings, his works include St Jerome, after Albrecht Dürer, Christ Descending into Limbo, after Andrea Mantegna, the Last Judgement, after Michelangelo, and a Landscape, after Titian.

Until 1577 Cartaro collaborated with the publisher Antonio Lafreri, providing illustrations for the Speculum Romanae magnificentiae, a collection of plans and views issued between 1545 and 1577, and for Le tavole moderne di geografia (c. 1580). In addition to the Map of Rome, one of his more noteworthy accomplishments is the rare Description of the territory of Perugia drawn by the mathematician Ignazio Danti (1536-1586). After this, he turned increasingly to the more profitable activity of print-selling.

In 1586, Cartaro moved to Naples, where he spent his last years making drawings for printed maps of the Kingdom of Naples with the help of the mathematician Nicola Antonio Stigliola (1547–1623).

== Gallery ==
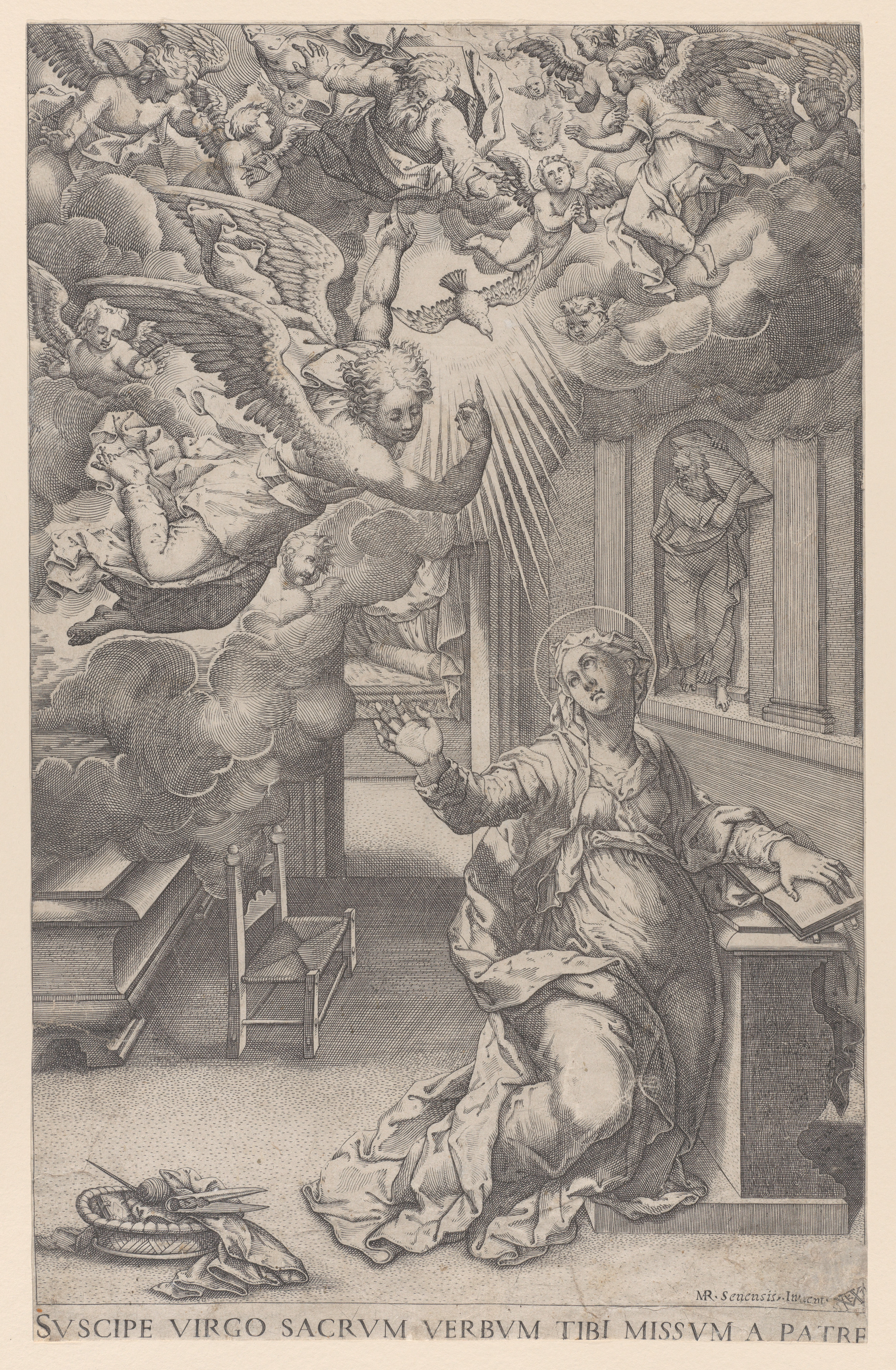
The Annunciation, Metropolitan Museum of Art, New York

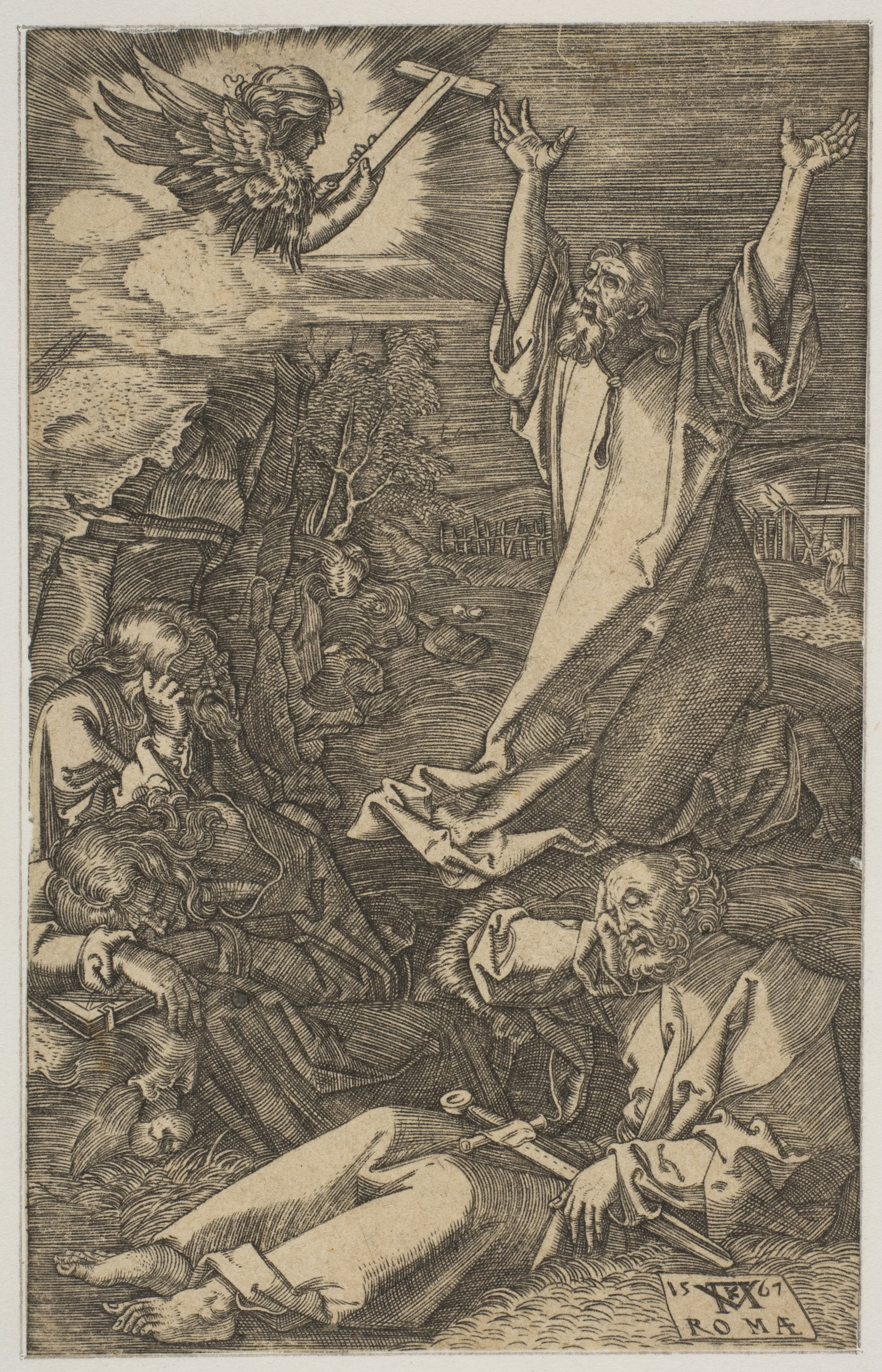
Christ on the Mount of Olives, Metropolitan Museum of Art, New York

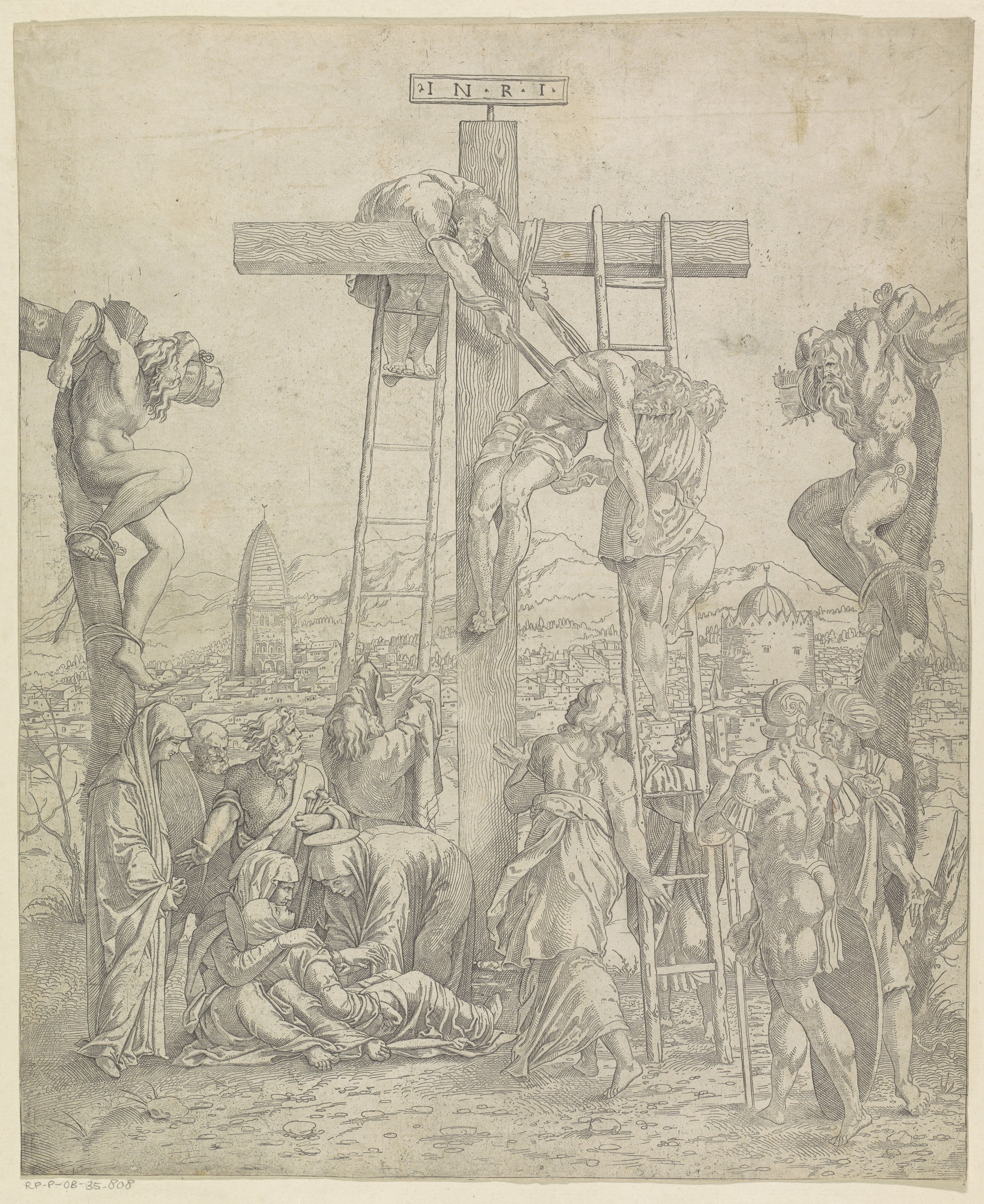
Descent from the Cross, Rijksmuseum, Amsterdam

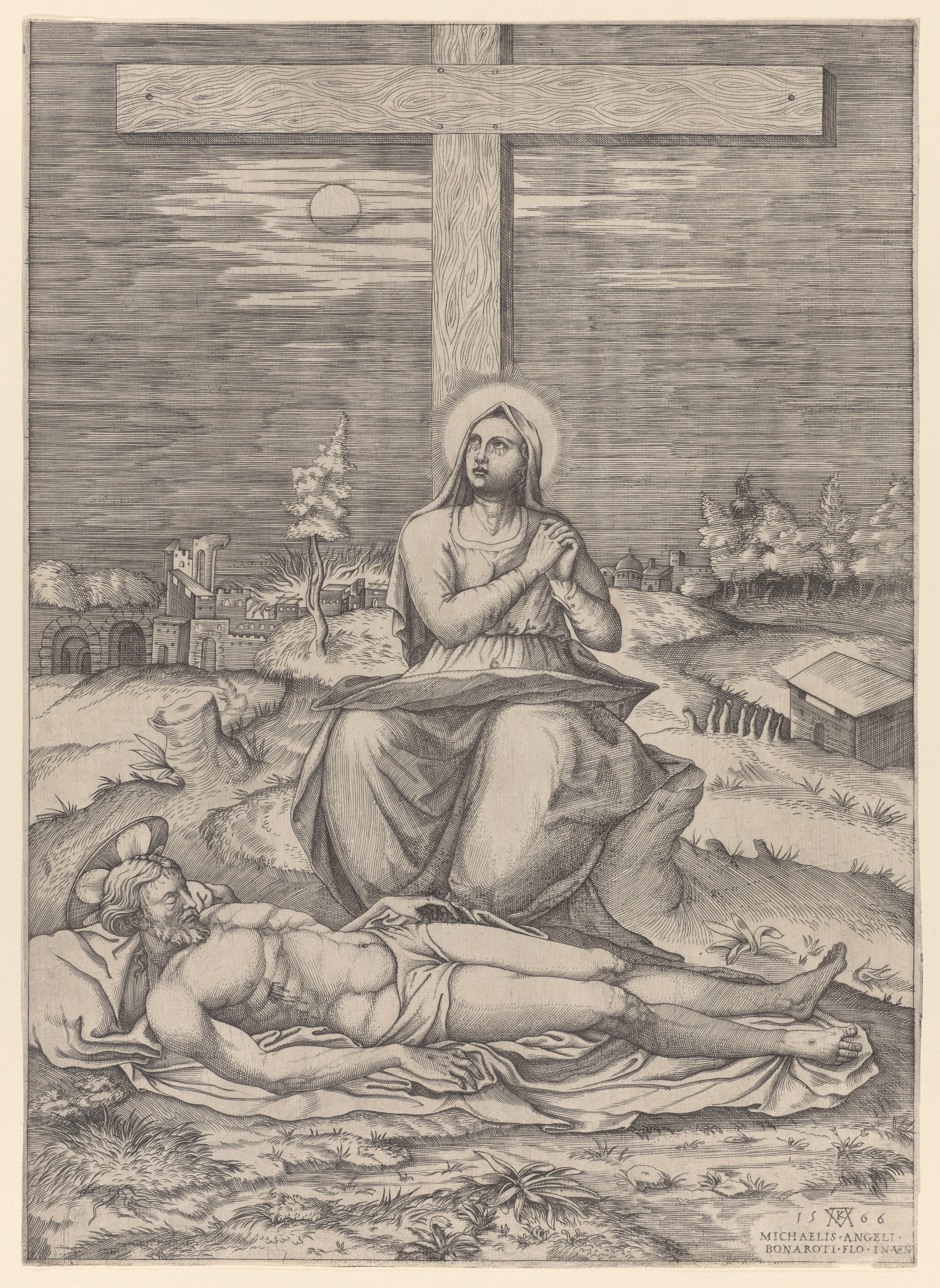
The Lamentation of the Virgin Beneath the Cross, Metropolitan Museum of Art, New York

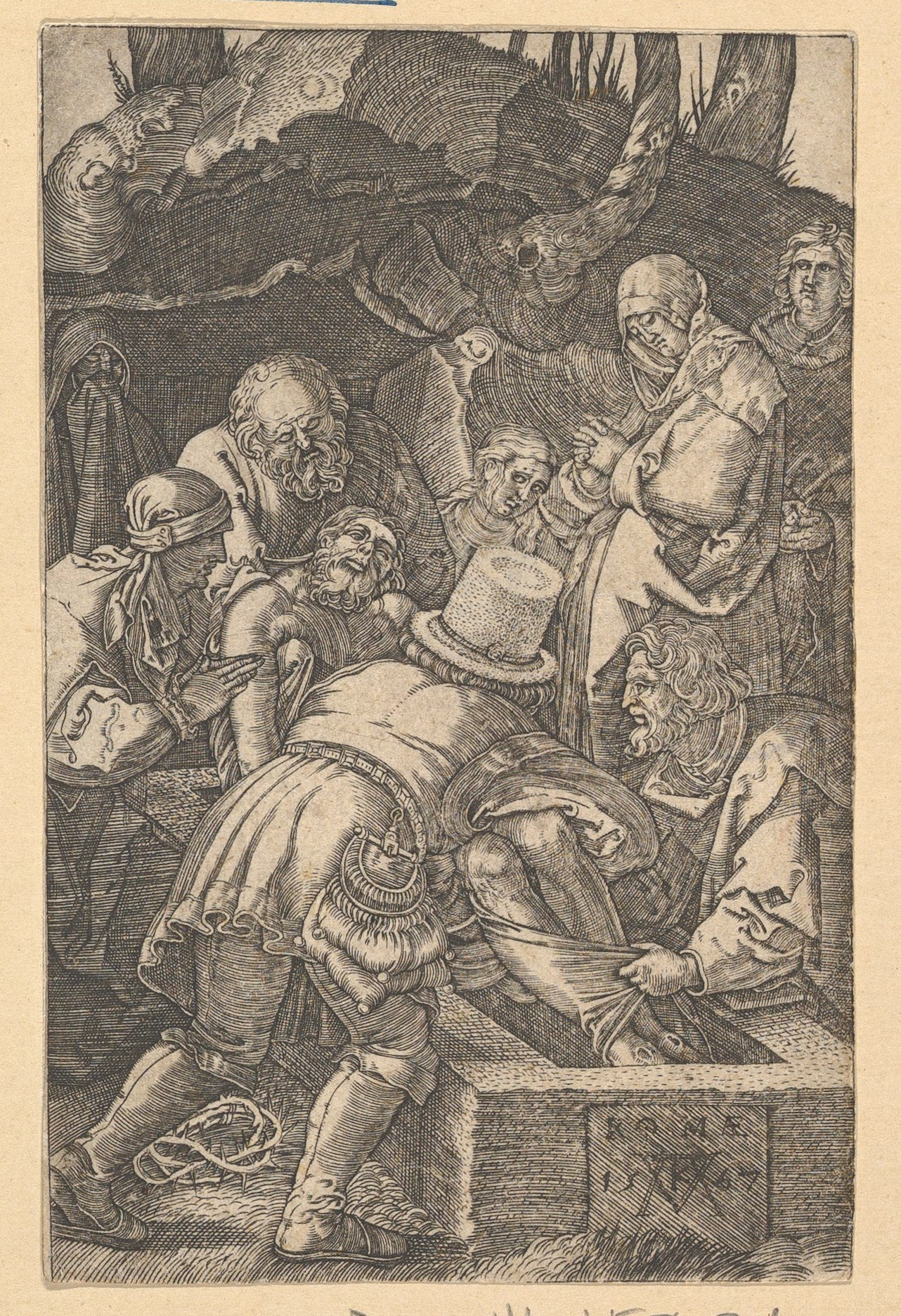
The Entombment of Christ, Metropolitan Museum of Art, New York

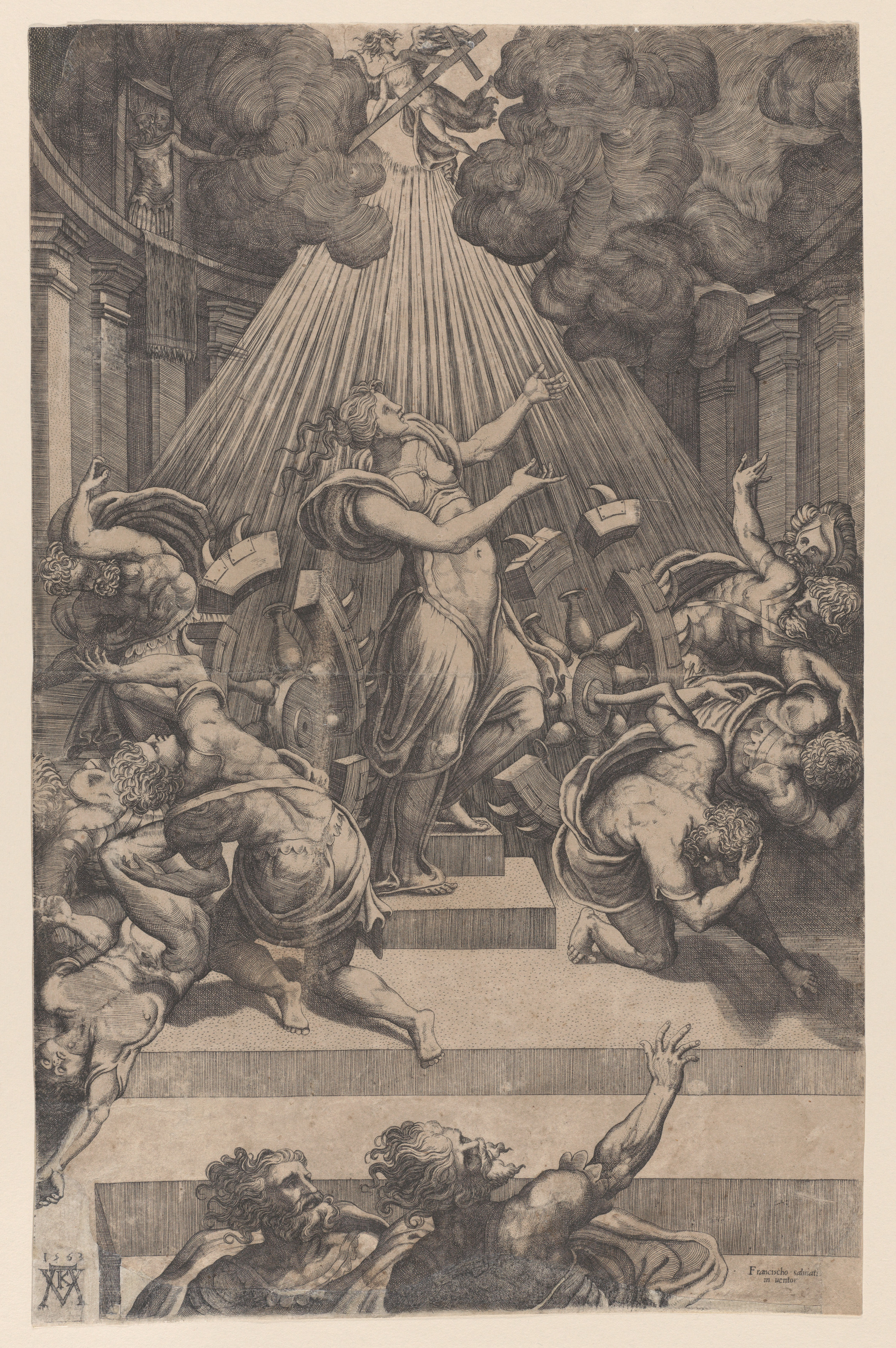
The Martyrdom of Saint Catherine, Metropolitan Museum of Art, New York

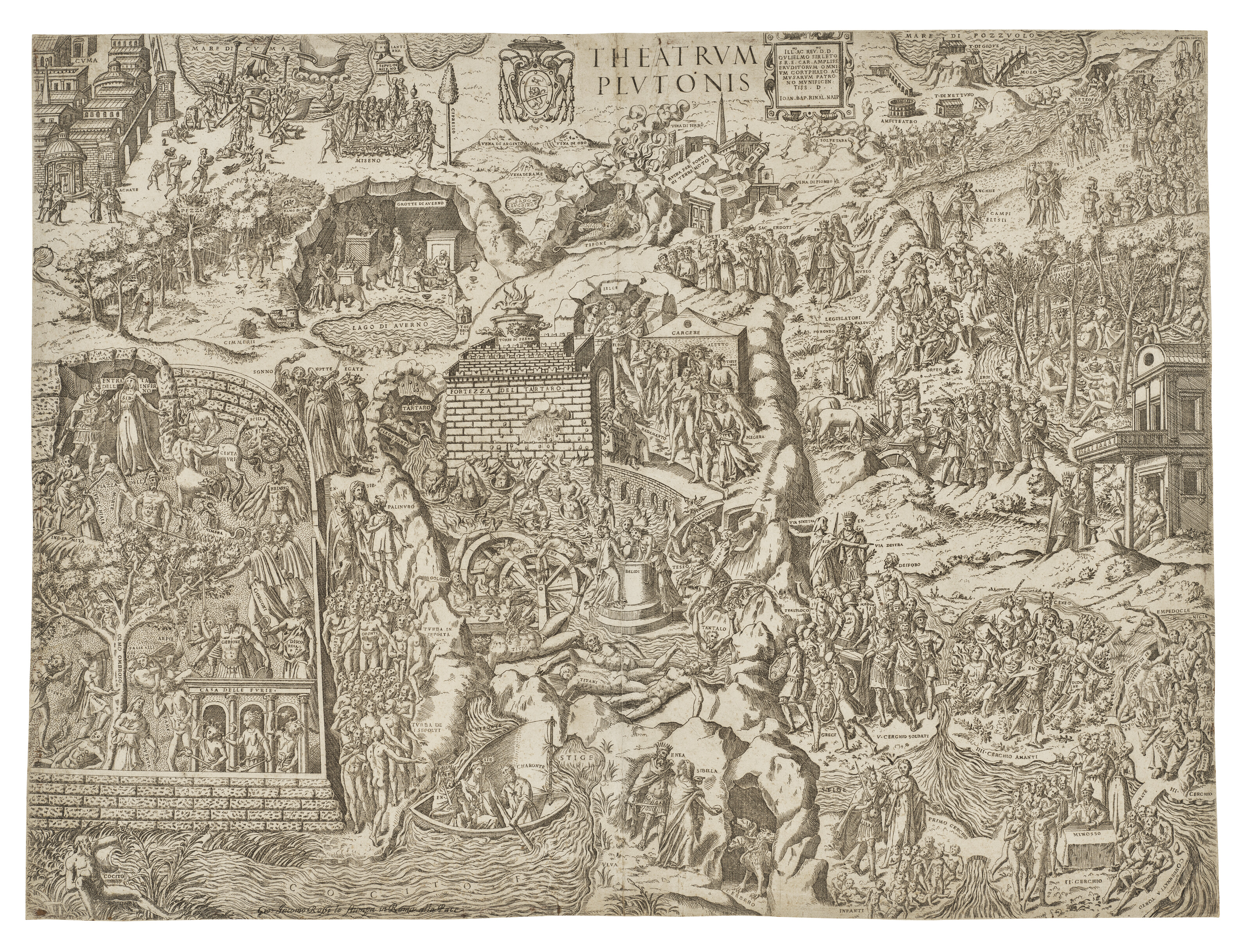
Theatrum Plutonis, Pontifical Scots College, Rome

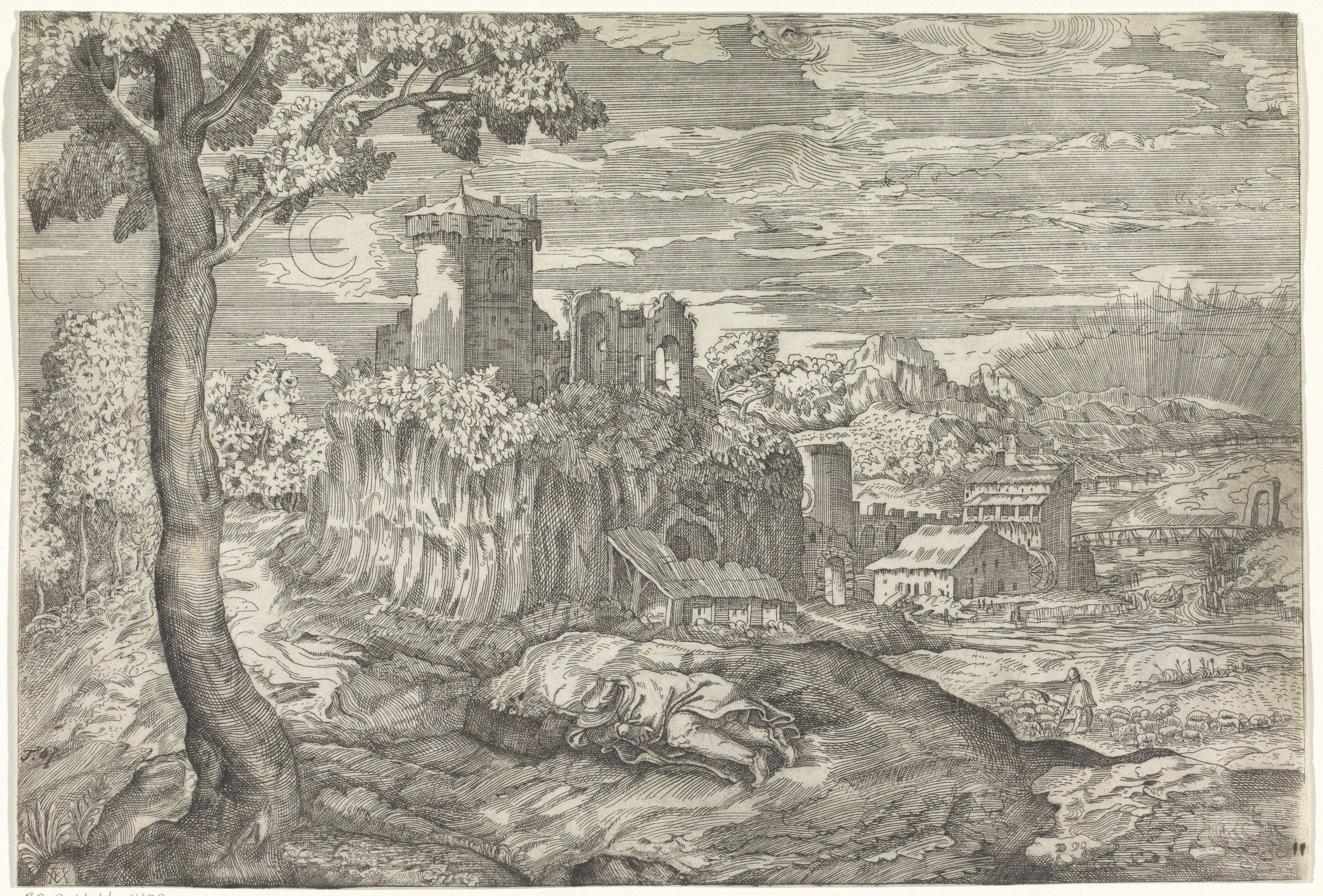
Landscape with castle ruins, Rijksmuseum, Amsterdam

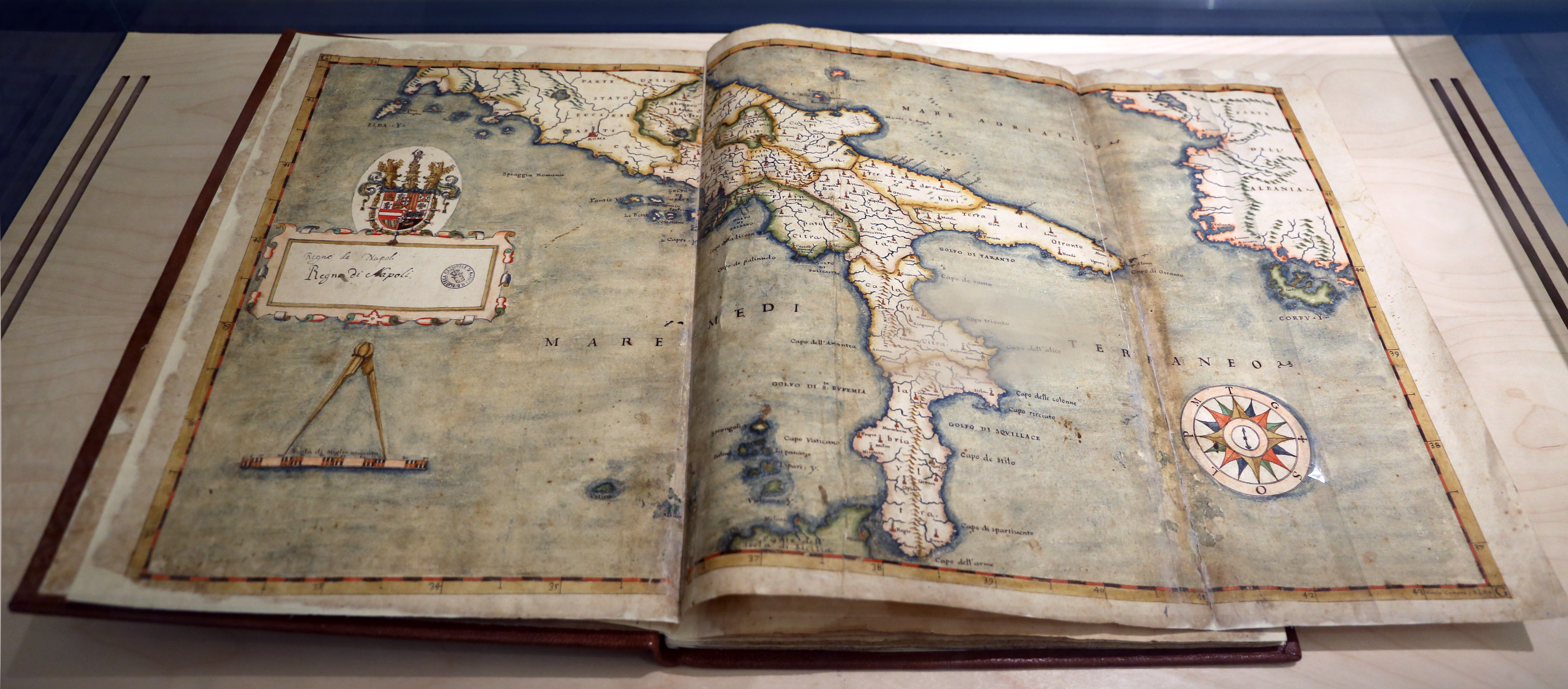
Map of the Kingdom of Naples, Biblioteca Nazionale Vittorio Emanuele III, Naples

== Bibliography ==
- Museo Galileo. "Mario Cartaro". Catalogue of the Museo Galileo's Instruments on Display. catalogue.museogalileo.it
- von Bartsch, A. (1803–21). Le Peintre-graveur. Vol. XV. pp. 520–32.
- Passavant, J. D. (1860–64). Le Peintre-graveur. Vol. vi. Leipzig. pp. 157–61.
- Cattaneo, A (1998). "Mario Cartaro, incisore viterbese del XVI secolo". Grafica d'arte. 9: 2–9.
