= Nicola Antonio Stigliola =

Italian philosopher (1546–1623)

Nicola Antonio Stigliola (Also: Colantonio Stelliola) (1546 Nola – 1623 Naples) was an Italian philosopher, printer, architect, and medical doctor. He was a friend of Tommaso Campanella and Giordano Bruno and a member of the Accademia dei Lincei.

He was an adherent of Copernican heliocentrism and of Bruno's ideas on Hermeticism and magic. He believed in the complex Pythagorean and Brunian cosmologies, including the view that the planets and stars were like the earth, covered in plants and animals: "Stigliola said to me...that it seemed irrational to him that bodies so much larger than the earth and the space between the center of the earth to the moon should be composed simply of idle fire, and not instead of all manner of elements and plants and animals and men, just as our countryman Philolaus held." Indeed, Stigliola and Bruno were born just two years apart in the same region of southern Italy, Nola, and in the same town of Monte Cicala.

== Early life ==
Nicola Antonio Stigliola was born in the year 1546 in Nola of the Kingdom of Naples. He was the firstborn of six siblings born to his parents Federico and Giustina.

== Early studies and life in Naples ==
Stigliola studied medicine at the University of Salerno, gaining his degree in 1571, after which he lived in Naples. There, he published "Theriace et Mithridatia Libellus" (1577), a polemic defending his teacher Maranta on the use of theria (a subclass of mammals), against the medical school at Padua - an effort that meant he could not progress as a medical student. Instead, he turned his attention to architecture and teaching. In the 1580s he became a topographer for the city of Naples, and developed a new survey for the kingdom that included then large unmapped swathes of Southern Italy. He also developed new plans for the city's port and city wall, neither of which were implemented. Instead, he turned to teaching, perhaps medicine as well as architecture. He was said to have had, at one time, 400 students. He also turned his hand to the very risky business of printing, establishing a press on the Porta Reale from 1593 to 1606. Eighty-two of these printed works are known today and the press was "one of the greatest of his day". He was tried for heresy and imprisoned in Naples in 1595, and released in 1597.

His epitaph, in part, reads: TO THE MEMBER OF THE LYNCEAN ACADEMY, NICOLA ANTONIO STIGLIOLA, NOT ONLY A PHILOSOPHER, BUT DISTINGUISHED IN ALL THE LIBERAL ARTS IN ADDITION TO THE PHYSICAL SCIENCES, POLITICS, ETHICS, ARCHITECTURE, MILITARY ARTS, AND ALL THAT PERTAINS TO THE PYTHAGOREAN SCIENCES ENDED HIS CAREER AS THE SUPREME MATHEMATICIAN IN THE CITY OF PARTHENOPE AT THE AGE OF NEARLY EIGHTY YEARS ON APRIL 11, 1623...

The following are works by Stigliola: Theriace et Mithridatia Libellus (1577) De gli elementi mechanici (1597) Telescopio, over ispecillo celeste (1627 posth.) Encyclopedia pythagorea (1616) [Only the index and section Delle apparenze celesti (1616) are believed to exist]

== Work as a Printer ==
=== Printing ===
Stigliola owned and operated a personal printing press by the name of Typographia Stelliolae where he would go on to print at least 80 known titles. He was good friends with the man Giambattista Della Porta and is known to have printed at least one of his works, as well as the works of many other contemporaries including: Torquato Tasso, Francesco Imperato, and Giulio Cortese.

=== Cartography ===
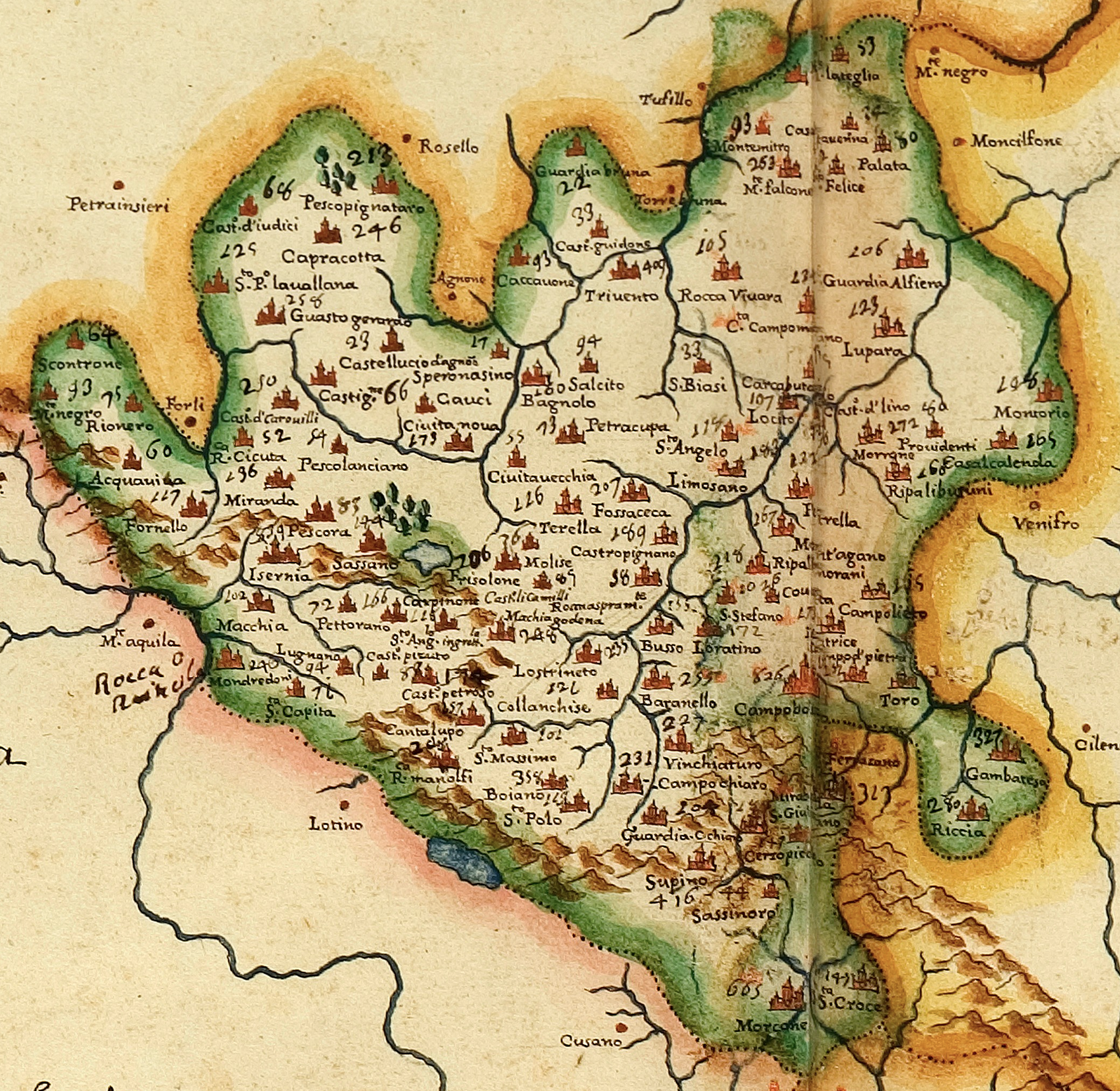
A map of the territory of Molise authored by Nicola Antonio Stigliola and Mario Cartaro - an example of work the two collaborated on together.

In 1583, Stigliola was occupied with creating a new survey of the city of Naples to better represent the kingdom and protect against unnecessary danger due to outdated representations. Stigliola was later partnered with Mario Cartaro (who would be tasked with engraving) in 1591, and the survey was completed in 1595. The survey was noteworthy due to extensive use of symbols, some novel at the time, as well as a plethora of accurate measurements and specific data useful for gathering information on Naples. It also included dedicated tools for taxation and the institutional management of different areas - outlining a given province and then labeling the "hearth money" they owed.

== Legal Encounters with the Inquisition ==
Stigliola was made into an official with the charge of "engineer of the city of Naples and of the fortifications tribunal" in 1593. Two years later in 1595 he would be directly charged with the crimes of irreligious behavior and fear/disrespect of government officials/mandates by a Jesuit, Clauido Migliaresi. This would lead to Stiglola's removal from office and trial conducted by the Inquisition. During the trial friends, students, and aqquantances of Stigliola would testify incriminating information. A student named Matteo di Capua revealed Stigliola's heliocentric beliefs. An individual named Scipio Spinello testified that Stigliola thought the institution wanted to keep the people simple minded, and that forbidden readings broadened perspectives. A friend of Stigliola also revealed his belief that Moses was a magician. Stigliola was arrested and imprisoned alongside Bruno and Campanella, and when charges were dropped in 1597, he would increase his adherence to the philosophies that originally endangered him. It is plausible that Stigliola may have shared a cell with Bruno or Campanella, which would help explain his increased fanaticism.

== Late Life and Death ==
Stigliola, after walking free from prison, would become a member of the Academy of the Lynx in 1612 after being nominated by Giovanbattista Della Porta. When Stigliola died in 1623, he was a highly celebrated member. He was recognized and appreciated by esteemed members of the institution, like Galileo Galilei, and his beliefs no longer put him at risk of persecution. He would be fully recognized for his Copernican philosophies and talents, and engaged in a fruitful relationship with other philosophers and scientists like Galileo for more than a decade.

=== Andrea Fodio Gambara ===
After Stigliola's death, Lynceans tasked the people familiar with him to collect his writings and works of significance, and one of the most significant was Andrea Fodio Gambara. Fodio was a man of many talents like Stigliola, and practiced medicine, astronomy, and philosophy; he was recognized and recommended as a potential Lynceans, but it is unclear if he was ever admitted.

==== The Encyclopedia pythagorea and Fodio's Continuation ====
In 1616 Stigliola started what he intended to be a gargantuan project, Encyclopedia Pythagorea, partly wherein the code observable in the infinite stars could be transcribed. It was one of the ways that Stigliola derived influence from Giordano Bruno, continuing the concept of using discovery and observation to decode the natural world and create a new perspective of nature. It was never finished, and Fodio would resume the responsibility of its completion. He claimed a work he wrote concerning gout, Il Camaleonte antipodagrico, discorso enciclopedico as a continuation of his previous mentor's work. He would express however, that he thought it was ultimately hopeless, as the proposed infinite nature of the problem meant it was impossible to ever complete.
