= Battle of Nola (215 BC) =

215 BC battle of the Second Punic War

Second Battle of Nola
- Part of the Second Punic War
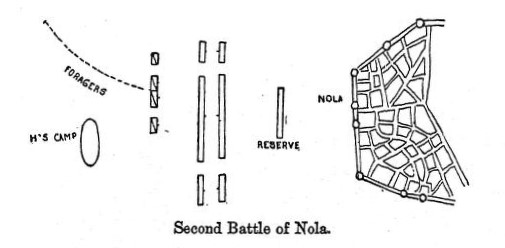
- Plan of the second battle of Nola (215 BC)
Date	August 215 BC
Location	Nola, present-day Italy 40.9261°N 14.5275°E
Result	See Aftermath section

Belligerents
Carthage	Roman Republic

Commanders and leaders
Hannibal; Hanno	Marcus Claudius Marcellus

The Second Battle of Nola was fought in 215 BC between Hannibal's army and a Roman force under Marcus Claudius Marcellus. It was Hannibal's second attempt to seize Nola after a failure the year before. He was again repelled and would make one more, also unsuccessful attempt the next year. For the Romans, it was a crucial success against Hannibal's army and gave them hope that they could win the war.

Hannibal's campaign against Nola (215 BC)

== Aftermath ==
Hans Delbrück in 1920 described the three battles of Nola as Marcellus' alleged victories and very insignificant engagements.

== See also ==
- Battle of Nola (216 BC)
- Battle of Nola (214 BC)

=== Sources ===
- Delbrück, Hans (1990) [1920]. History of the Art of War Volume I: Warfare in Antiquity [Geschichte der kriegskunst im Rahmen der politischen Geschichte]. Translated by Renfroe Jr., Walter J. Lincoln, Neb.: University of Nebraska Press/ Bison Book. ISBN 978-0-8032-9199-7.
