= Nicola Napolitano (brigand) =

19th Century brigand in Sicily

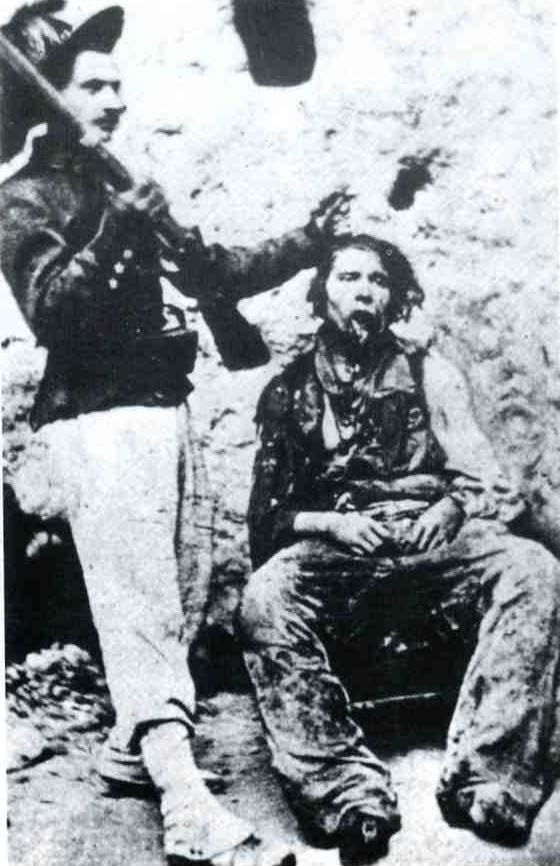
- Bersaglieri posing with the dead body of Napolitano after his execution by firing squad
- Born: 28 February 1838; Nola, Kingdom of the Two Sicilies
- Died: 10 September 1863 (aged 25); Nola, Kingdom of the Two Sicilies
- Cause of death: executed by shooting
- Other name: Caprariello
- Education: illiterate
- Occupation: brigand
- Years active: 1861–1863
- Known for: led his own brigand band during 1862
- Parent(s): Sabato and Carmela from Naples

Nicola Napolitano (28 February 1838 – 10 September 1863), also known by the nickname Caprariello, a nickname derived from his activity as a goatherd, was born in Nola, Kingdom of the Two Sicilies. His parents were the peasants Sabato and Carmela from Naples. Illiterate, having never attended school, he was recruited in 1861 into the military service established by the newborn Kingdom of Italy.

Disobedient, he was arrested and forced to attend military service, but deserted almost immediately, joining the brigands led by the La Gala brothers from Nola, where he soon played an important role, gaining a reputation for his fierceness and strength, to the point of being able to put together and lead his own brigand band during 1862.

Arrested after a shooting fight at the beginning of September 1863, he was executed by shooting in his birth city, Nola, on the 10th of that month.
