= Battle of Nola (214 BC) =

214 BC battle of the Second Punic War

Third Battle of Nola
- Part of the Second Punic War
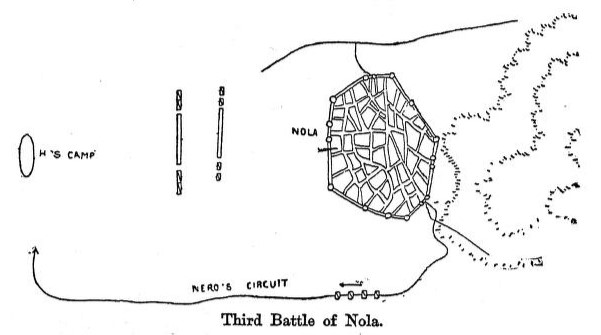
- Plan of the third battle of Nola (214 BC)
Date	214 BC
Location	Nola, present-day Italy 40.9261°N 14.5275°E
Result	See Aftermath section

Belligerents
Carthage	Roman Republic

Commanders and leaders
Hannibal	Marcus Claudius Marcellus; Gaius Claudius Nero

The Third Battle of Nola was fought in 214 BC between Hannibal and a Roman army led by Marcus Claudius Marcellus. It was Hannibal's third attempt to take the town of Nola. Once again, Marcellus successfully prevented the town's capture.

== Background ==
Upon Hannibal's descent from the Alps, over three years he had won an impressive string of victories against Rome The battles of Ticinus, Trebia, Trasimene and Cannae were some of his more notable victories. These had been disastrous defeats for the Romans, especially Cannae. This victory by Hannibal brought the Romans to the brink of despair. The Senate had issued a decree that forbade anyone to say the word, "Peace" within the city itself. Mourning was legislatively circumscribed to 30 days and women were not permitted to cry in the public venues. In spite of these and other similar measures, there was much despair in the city.

However, in spite of his tremendous blows against Rome, Hannibal could not take the city itself. He did not consider that he had the resources that a siege of the city would have required so did not attempt it. Another factor was that even after the Battle of Cannae, Hannibal had not been able to break up the Roman confederation. Not a single member of the confederation broke its treaty with Rome. The roots of Roman power in the peninsula went deep, based upon time and the mutual benefit that both Rome and her subordinate allies had received from the alliance. There were colonies that had been detached from Rome in Cisalpine Gaul, but to date there had been no breach of the confederation.

Hannibal recognised that being able to detach the confederates from Rome itself would help cement a lasting victory. So after the Battle of Cannae, Hannibal engaged in diplomacy to this effect. Philip V of Macedon promised Hannibal that he would provide naval and military support. Philip hoped to simultaneously strike a blow against Rome while regaining Epirus. In addition, Hiero II of Syracuse had recently died, and his successor, Hieronymus of Syracuse, concluded a treaty with Hannibal. With the aim of detaching some of the confederates from Rome, Hannibal released all the prisoners who were from Roman confederate cities without requiring any ransom.

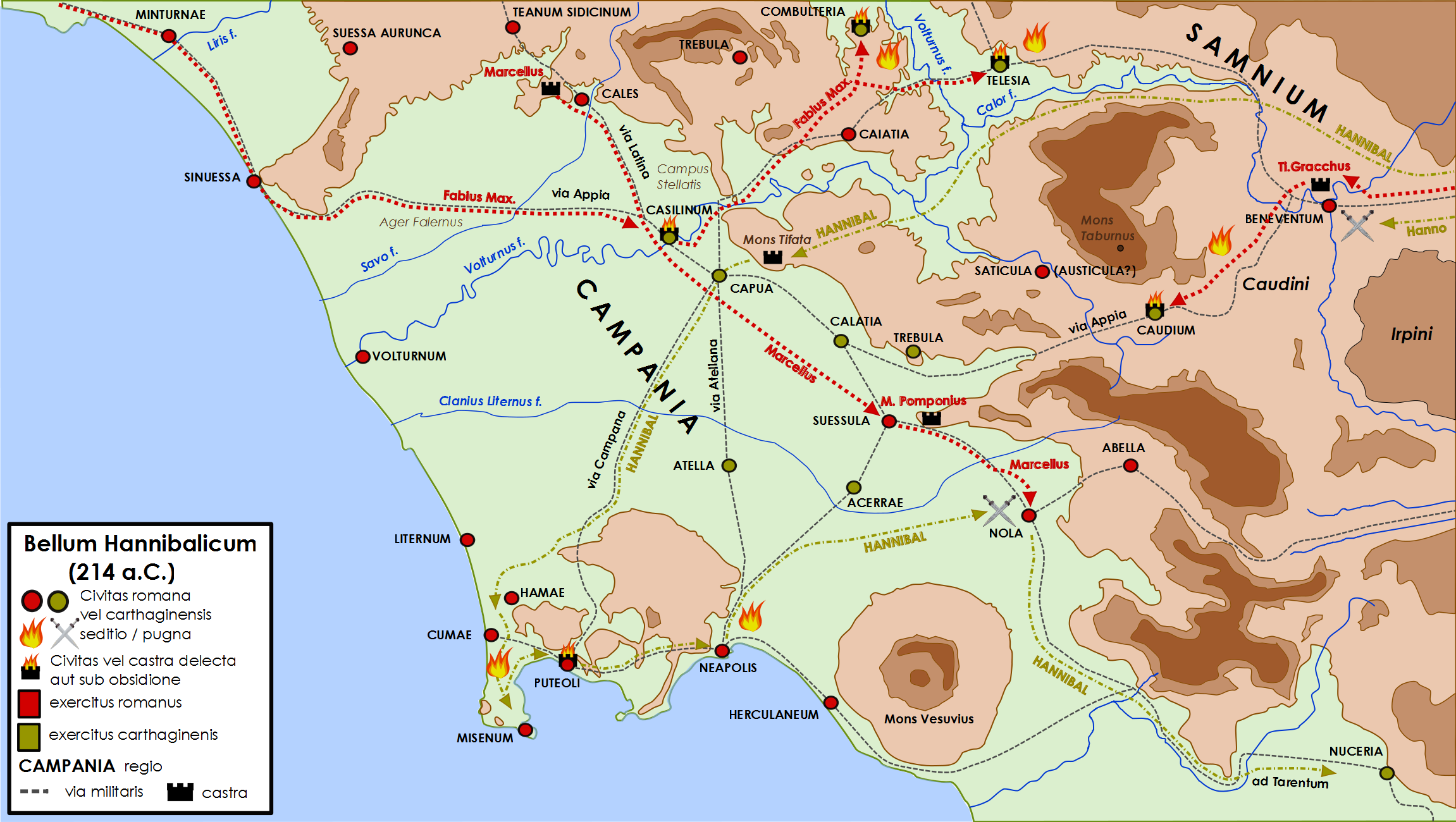
The campaign of 214 BC in Campania

In spite of Hannibal's military ascendancy over Rome, his situation was weak. His finances were stretched to their limit. So he sent a deputation to Rome requesting money in return for hostages. This deputation was forbidden to even enter the city, and the Senate forbid anyone from purchasing hostages from the Carthaginians, deeming the enrichment of Hannibal by using the wealth of Rome and its citizens to be unacceptable.

Yet a number of Rome's allies did change sides. Capua, the second city in Italy and in a commanding position on the plains of Campania switched sides and joined Hannibal. This city had been oppressed by the Romans facing discriminatory treatment by the Senate and the chief magistrates of the Republic. This city was able to furnish Hannibal with 30,000 foot and 4,000 cavalry. Similarly Uxuntum, much of Bruttia, much of Lucania, the Picentes of Salernia, the Harpini and almost all of Samnium joined Hannibal's side. In effect, Hannibal managed to win over virtually all of southern Italy. From the mouth of the Vulturnus river to the peninsula of Mons Garganus and south, only a string of Roman forts held out against Hannibal and his allies.

== Aftermath ==
Hans Delbrück in 1920 described the three battles of Nola as Marcellus' alleged victories and very insignificant engagements.

== See also ==
- Battle of Nola (216 BC) – 216 BC battle of the Second Punic War
- Battle of Nola (215 BC) – 215 BC battle of the Second Punic War

=== Sources ===
- Delbrück, Hans (1990) [1920]. History of the Art of War Volume I: Warfare in Antiquity [Geschichte der kriegskunst im Rahmen der politischen Geschichte]. Translated by Renfroe Jr., Walter J. Lincoln, Neb.: University of Nebraska Press/ Bison Book. ISBN 978-0-8032-9199-7.
- Dodge, Theodore (1994) [1891]. Hannibal. Mechanicsburg, PA: Greenhill Books. ISBN 9781853671791. Reprint of 1891 work.
