= Epicydes =

3rd century BC Syracusan general

Epicydes or Epikudês (Ancient Greek: Ἐπικύδης) (3rd century BCE) was a Greco-Carthaginian of Syracusan descent who first served in Hannibal's army during his invasion of Italy and then led the Syracusans in their struggle against Rome during the Second Punic War.

A Syracusan by paternal descent, he was born and educated in Carthage as the son of a Carthaginian mother. His grandfather, after having been banished by the tyrant Agathocles, had settled in the city.

Epicydes served, together with his elder brother Hippocrates, with much distinction in the army of Hannibal, both in Spain and Italy. When, after the Battle of Cannae, Hieronymus of Syracuse sent to make overtures offering an alliance to Hannibal, that general selected the two brothers as his envoys to Syracuse and Epicydes was made the leader of the Punic party in Syracuse. They soon gained over the wavering mind of the young king, and induced him to desert the city's long-held Roman alliance. But the murder of Hieronymus shortly after, and the revolution that ensued at Syracuse, for a time derailed their plans. At first, they demanded merely safe-conduct to return to Hannibal. But they soon found that they could do more good by their intrigues at Syracuse, where they even succeeded in procuring their election as generals in the place of the pro-Roman Andranodorus and Themistus.

But the Roman party again obtained the upper hand. After Hippocrates had been sent with a force to Leontini, Epicydes joined him there, and they set at defying the Syracusan government by fighting the local Roman forces. Leontini was, indeed, quickly defeated by Marcellus, but his cruelties there alienated the Syracusans, and still more the use of foreign mercenaries in his service. Of this disposition, Hippocrates and Epicydes (who had made their escape to Herbessos) ably availed themselves. They managed to convince the troops sent against them to mutiny, and returned at their head to Syracuse, of which they made themselves Tyrants with little difficulty in 214 BCE.

Marcellus immediately proceeded to besiege Syracuse, the defence of which was conducted with ability and vigour by the two brothers, who had been again appointed generals. When the Roman commander found himself obliged to turn the siege into a blockade, Epicydes continued to hold the city itself, while Hippocrates conducted the operations in other parts of Sicily. The former was, however, unable to prevent the surprise of the Epipolae, which were betrayed into the hands of Marcellus. But still he exerted his utmost efforts against the Romans, and co-operated zealously with a Carthaginian army sent to aid Syracuse under Himilco and Hippocrates. After the defeat of the latter, Epicydes went in person to meet Bomilcar, who was advancing with a Carthaginian fleet to the relief of the city, and hasten his arrival. But, after the retreat of Bomilcar, he seems to have regarded the fall of Syracuse as inevitable, and withdrew to Agrigentum. Here he appears to have remained and co-operated with the Numidian commander Mutines, until the capture of Agrigentum (210 BCE) obliged him to flee with Hanno to Carthage, after which his name is not again mentioned.

== Footnotes ==
Preceded by: Adranodoros	Tyrant of Syracuse; 214 BC – 212 BC, with Hippocrates	Succeeded by: Position abolished (Syracuse incorporated into the Roman province of Sicilia)
