= Siege of Syracuse (213–212 BC) =

Roman victory during the Second Punic War

Coordinates: 37.0833°N 15.2833°E

- Part of the Second Punic War
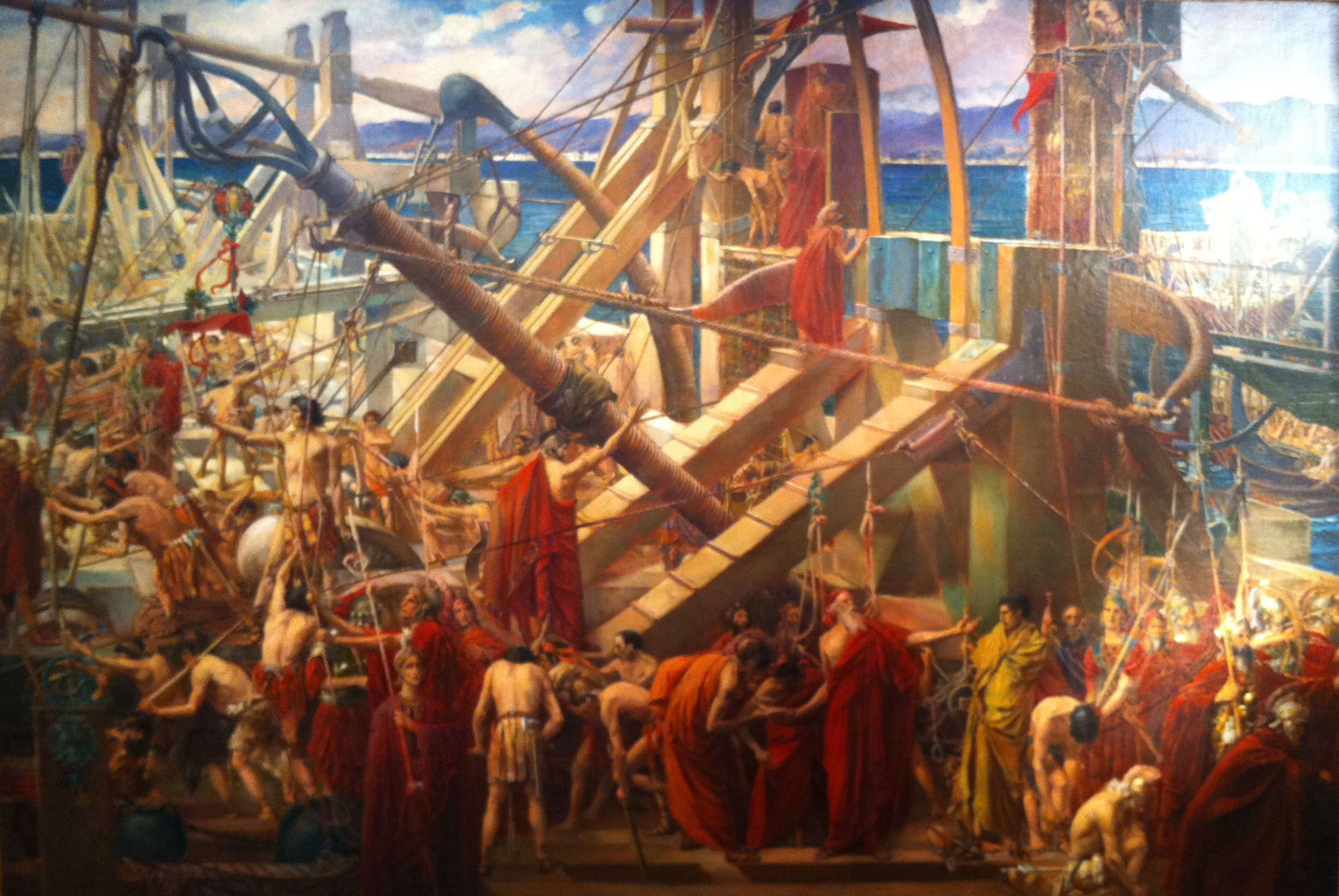
- Archimedes Directing the Defenses of Syracuse by Thomas Ralph Spence (1895)
| Date | Spring 213 – Autumn 212 BC |
| Location | Syracuse |
| Result | Roman victory: Syracuse completely sacked |

Belligerents
| Roman Republic | Syracuse; Carthage |

Commanders and leaders
| Marcus Claudius Marcellus; Appius Claudius Pulcher | Epicydes; Hippocrates †; Himilco # Bomilcar |

Strength
| 16,000–18,000 | 21,000–25,000 |

Casualties and losses
| Heavy | 5,000+ (plus "large" amount of civilians) |

The siege of Syracuse by the Roman Republic took place in 213–212 BC. The Romans successfully stormed the Hellenistic city of Syracuse after a protracted siege, giving them control of the entire island of Sicily. During the siege, the city was protected by weapons developed by the prominent inventor and polymath Archimedes, who was slain at the conclusion of the siege by a Roman soldier, in contravention of the Roman proconsul Marcellus's instructions to spare his life.

== Prelude ==
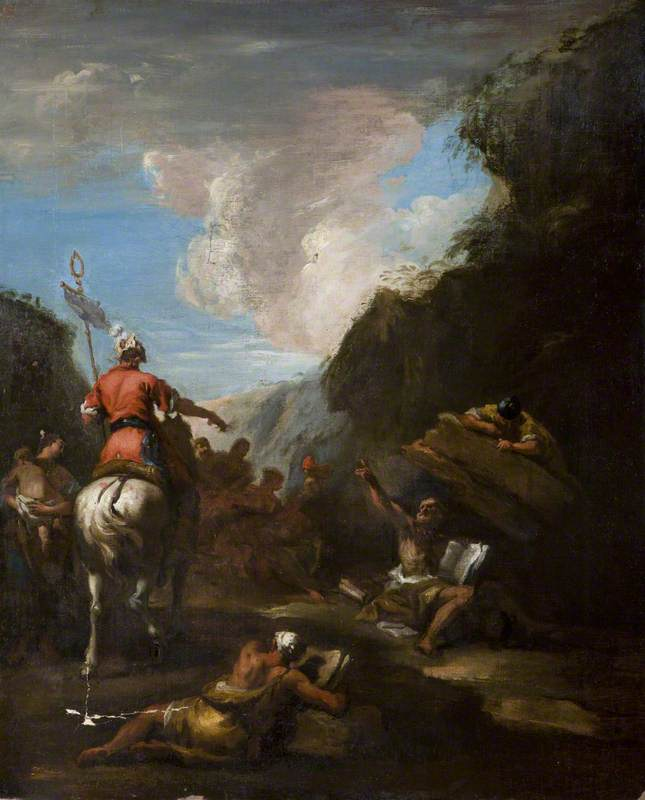
Hiero II of Syracuse calls Archimedes to fortify the city by Sebastiano Ricci (1720s)

Sicily, which was wrested from Carthaginian control during the First Punic War (264–241 BC), was the first province of the Roman Republic not directly part of Italy. The Kingdom of Syracuse was an allied independent region in the south east of the island and a close ally of Rome during the long reign of King Hiero II. In 215 BC, Hiero's grandson, Hieronymus, came to the throne on his grandfather's death and Syracuse fell under the influence of an anti-Roman faction, including two of his uncles, amongst the Syracusan elite. Despite the assassination of Hieronymus and the removal of the pro-Carthaginian leaders, Rome's threatening reaction to the danger of a Syracusan alliance with Carthage would force the new republican leaders of Syracuse to prepare for war.

Despite diplomatic attempts, war broke out between the Roman Republic and the Kingdom of Syracuse in 214 BC, while the Romans were still busy battling with Carthage at the height of the Second Punic War (218–201 BC). The city had been retaken by the pro-Carthaginian faction, led by the Greco-Carthaginian Epicydes, who had served under Hannibal Barca in Italy, and his brother Hippocrates, both of whom had named themselves tyrant.

A Roman force led by the proconsul Marcus Claudius Marcellus supported by the propraetor Appius Claudius Pulcher consequently laid siege to the port city by sea and land in 213 BC. The city of Syracuse, located on the eastern coast of Sicily was renowned for its significant fortifications, great walls that protected the city from attack. Among the Syracuse defenders was the mathematician and scientist Archimedes.

== Siege ==
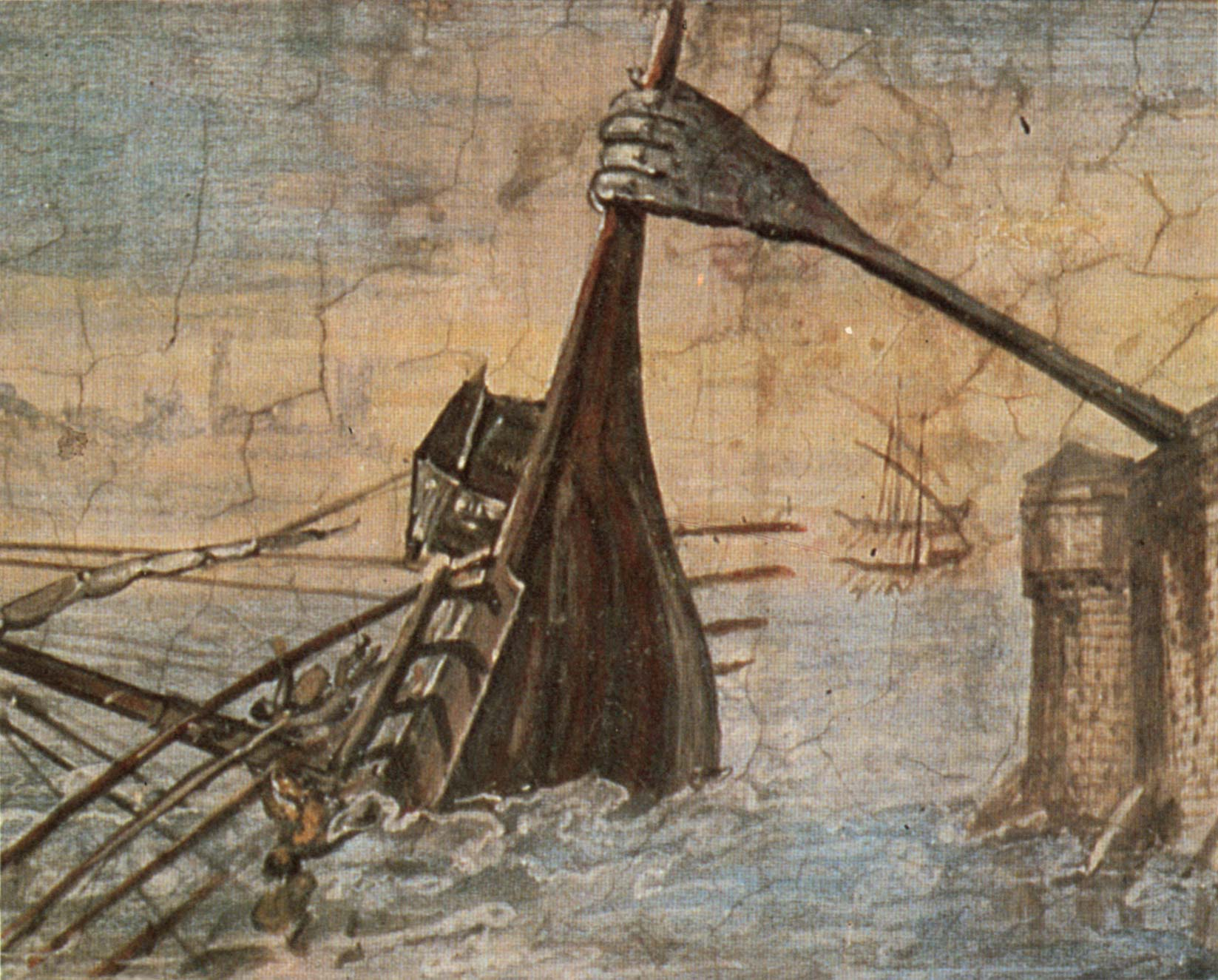
Detail of a wall painting of the Claw of Archimedes sinking a ship (c. 1600)

The city was fiercely defended for many months against all the measures the Romans could bring to bear. Realising how difficult the siege would be, the Romans brought their own unique devices and inventions to aid their assault. These included the sambuca, a floating siege tower with grappling hooks, as well as ship-mounted scaling ladders that were lowered with pulleys onto the city walls.

Within the city, Archimedes devised defensive devices to counter the Roman efforts including a huge crane-operated hook – the Claw of Archimedes – that was used to lift the enemy ships out of the sea before dropping them to their doom. Legend has it that he also created a giant mirror that was used to deflect the sun's rays onto the ships' sails, setting fire to them. These measures, along with the fire from ballistas and onagers mounted on the city walls, frustrated the Romans and forced them to attempt costly direct assaults.

== Stalemate ==
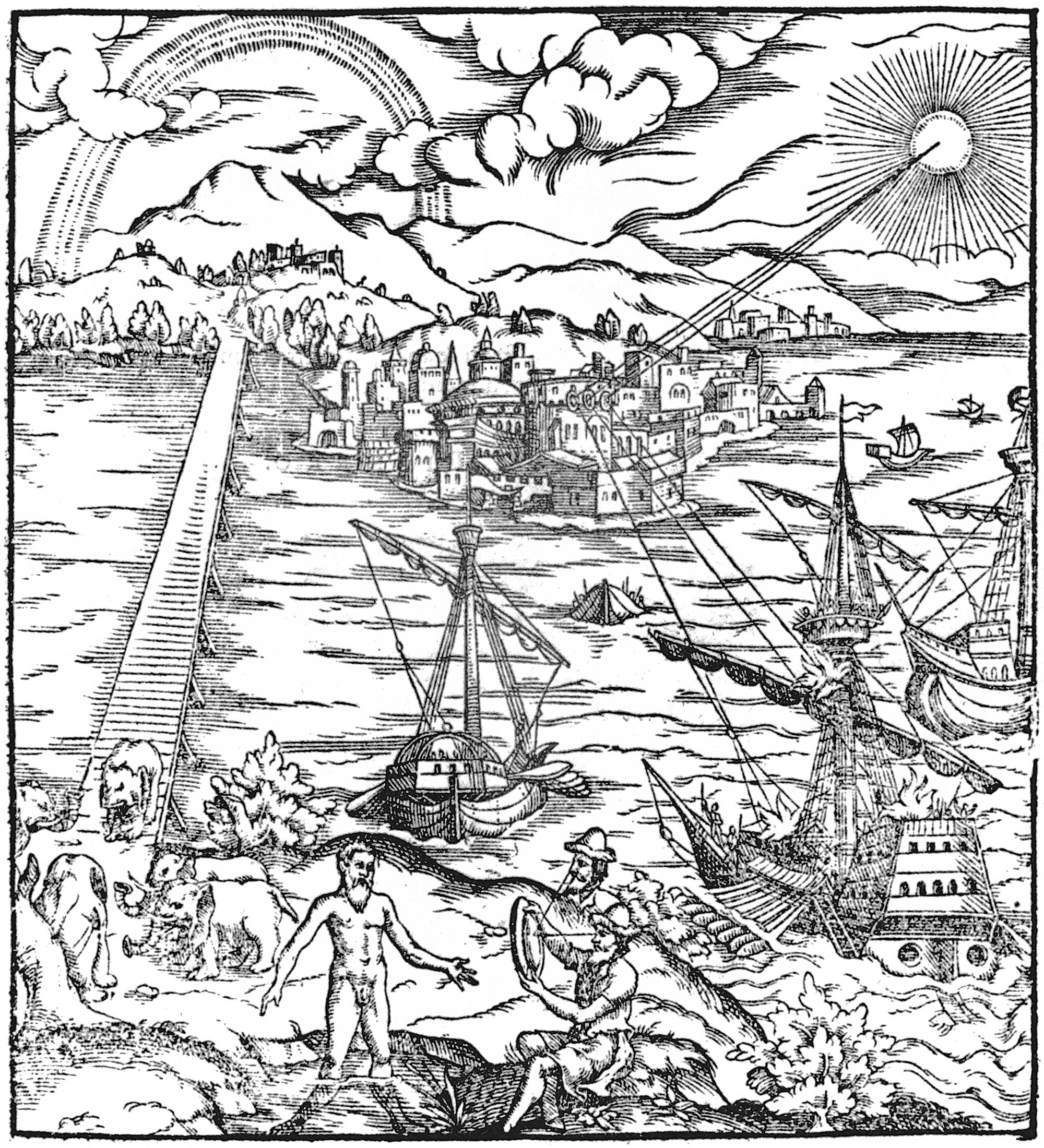
Archimedes sets Roman ships on fire before Syracuse with the help of parabolic mirrors.

The siege bogged down to a stalemate with the Romans unable to force their way into the city or keep their blockade tight enough to stop supplies reaching the defenders, and the Syracusans unable to force the Romans to withdraw. The Carthaginians realised the potential hindrance a continuing Syracusan defence could cause to the Roman war effort and attempted to relieve the city from the besiegers but were driven back. Though they planned another attempt, they could not afford the necessary troops and ships with the ongoing war against the Romans in Hispania, and the Syracusans were on their own. However, the Carthaginians were successful in resupplying the city, while their land forces under Himilco were able to capture several Sicilian cities, including the old Carthaginian stronghold of Agrigentum, due to the Roman preoccupation with the siege.

== Conclusion ==
The successes of the Syracusans in repelling the Roman siege had made them overconfident. In 212 BC, the Romans received information that the city's inhabitants were to participate in the annual festival to their goddess Artemis. A small party of Roman soldiers approached the city under the cover of night and managed to scale the walls to get into the outer city and with reinforcements soon took control, but the main fortress remained firm.

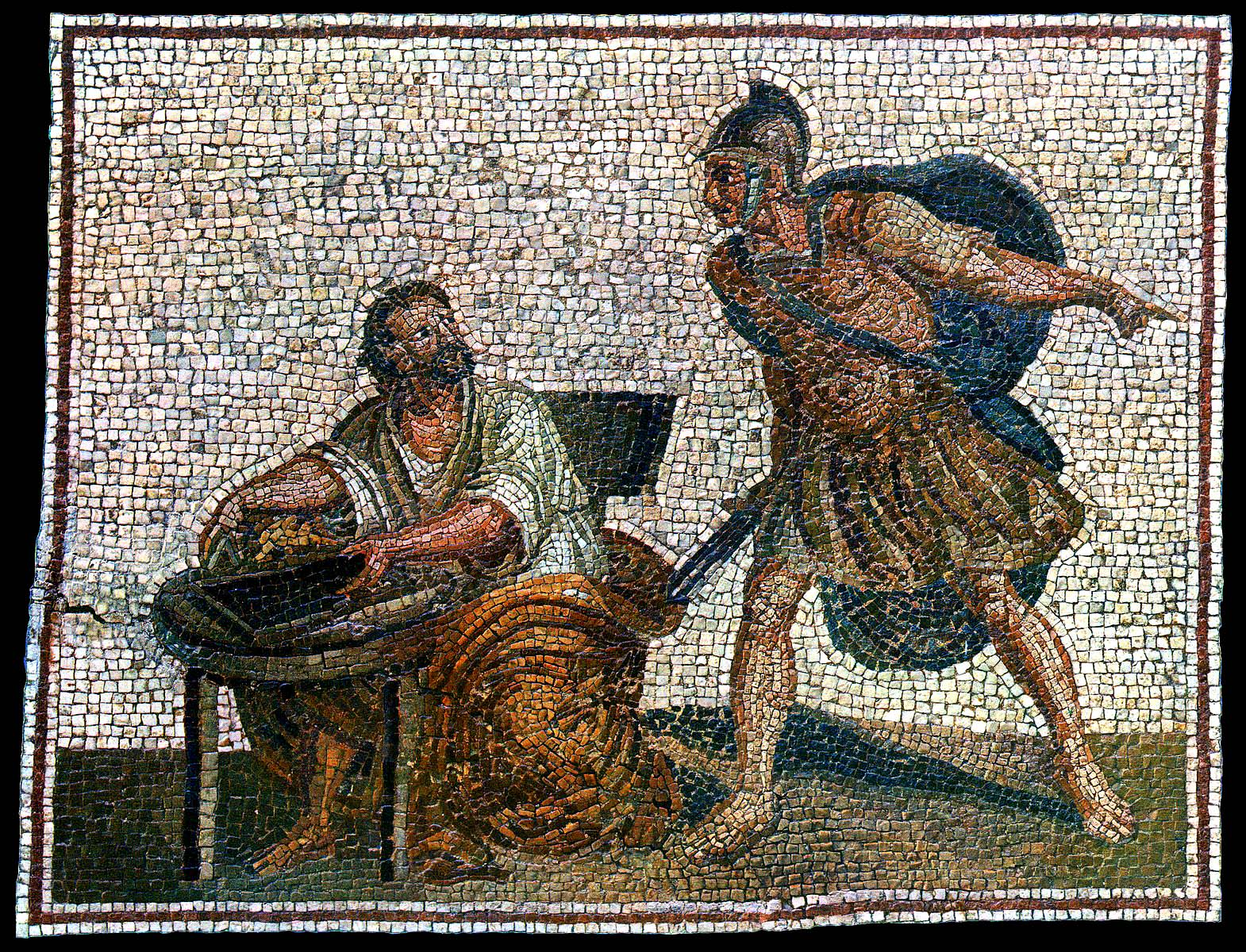
Archimedes before his death with a Roman soldier – copy of a Roman mosaic from the 2nd century

Marcus Claudius Marcellus had ordered that Archimedes, the well-known mathematician – and possibly equally well-known to Marcellus as the inventor of the mechanical devices that had so dominated the siege – should not be killed. Archimedes, who was now around 78 years of age, continued his studies after the breach by the Romans and while at home, his work was disturbed by a Roman soldier. Archimedes protested at this interruption and coarsely told the soldier to leave; the soldier, not knowing who he was, killed Archimedes on the spot.

The Romans now controlled the outer city but the remainder of the population of Syracuse had quickly fallen back to the fortified inner citadel, offering continued resistance. The Romans now put siege to the citadel and were successful in cutting off supplies to this reduced area. After a lengthy eight-month siege which brought great hardship onto the defenders through hunger, and with parleys in progress, an Iberian captain named Moeriscus, one of the three prefects of Achradina, decided to save his own life by letting the Romans in near the Fountains of Arethusa. On the agreed signal, during a diversionary attack, he opened the gate. After setting guards on the houses of the pro-Roman faction, Marcellus gave Syracuse to plunder. Frustrated and angered after the lengthy and costly siege, the Romans rampaged through the citadel and slaughtered many of the Syracusans where they stood and enslaved most of the rest. The city was then thoroughly looted and sacked.

== Aftermath ==
The city of Syracuse was now under the control of Rome again, which united the whole of Sicily as a Roman province by 210 BC. The taking of Syracuse ensured that the Carthaginians could not gain a foothold in Sicily, which could have led to them giving support to Hannibal's Italian campaign. This allowed the Romans to concentrate on waging the war in Spain and Italy. The island was used as a vital gathering point for the final victorious campaign in Africa ten years later and would prove to be an important stepping stone onto both Africa and Greece in coming Roman conflicts.

Syracuse was later extensively rebuilt and repopulated and would be an important city for the Roman Empire until well into the 5th century, playing both a military and economic role in the fostering of the empire.

== In popular culture ==
- Book XIV of Sillius Italicus's Punica, relating the events of the Second Punic War, focuses on the Siege of Syracuse.
- Archimedes and the siege of Syracuse are dramatically re-enacted in the classic early Italian silent film Cabiria (1914).
- The 1960 film Siege of Syracuse dramatizes the events of the siege.
- The events surrounding the siege are the basis for the manga Heureka by Hitoshi Iwaaki.
- The Siege of Syracuse is a campaign mission in the Rise of Rome expansion of Age of Empires, where players play as the Roman civilization to defeat the Carthaginians.
- The climax of the 2023 film Indiana Jones and the Dial of Destiny is set during the Siege of Syracuse. The setting also features the use of Classical Greek.

== Bibliography ==
- Evans, R. J. (2009). Syracuse in Antiquity: History and Topography: Chapter 4: "The Four Great Sieges of Syracuse". University of South Africa Press.
- Govan, K. (2016) "Fortifications of Syracuse: Dionysius I, 405 to 396 BCE". University of Oregon Thesis. (Contains maps)
- Hoyos, Dexter (2015). Mastering the West: Rome and Carthage at War. Oxford: Oxford University Press. ISBN 978-0-19-986010-4.
- Rossi, A. (2000). "The Tears of Marcellus: History of a Literary Motif in Livy". Greece & Rome, Vol. 47, No. 1 (Apr., 2000), pp. 56-66.
