= Battle of the Rhône Crossing =

Battle of the Second Punic War

Battle of the Rhone Crossing
- Part of the Second Punic War
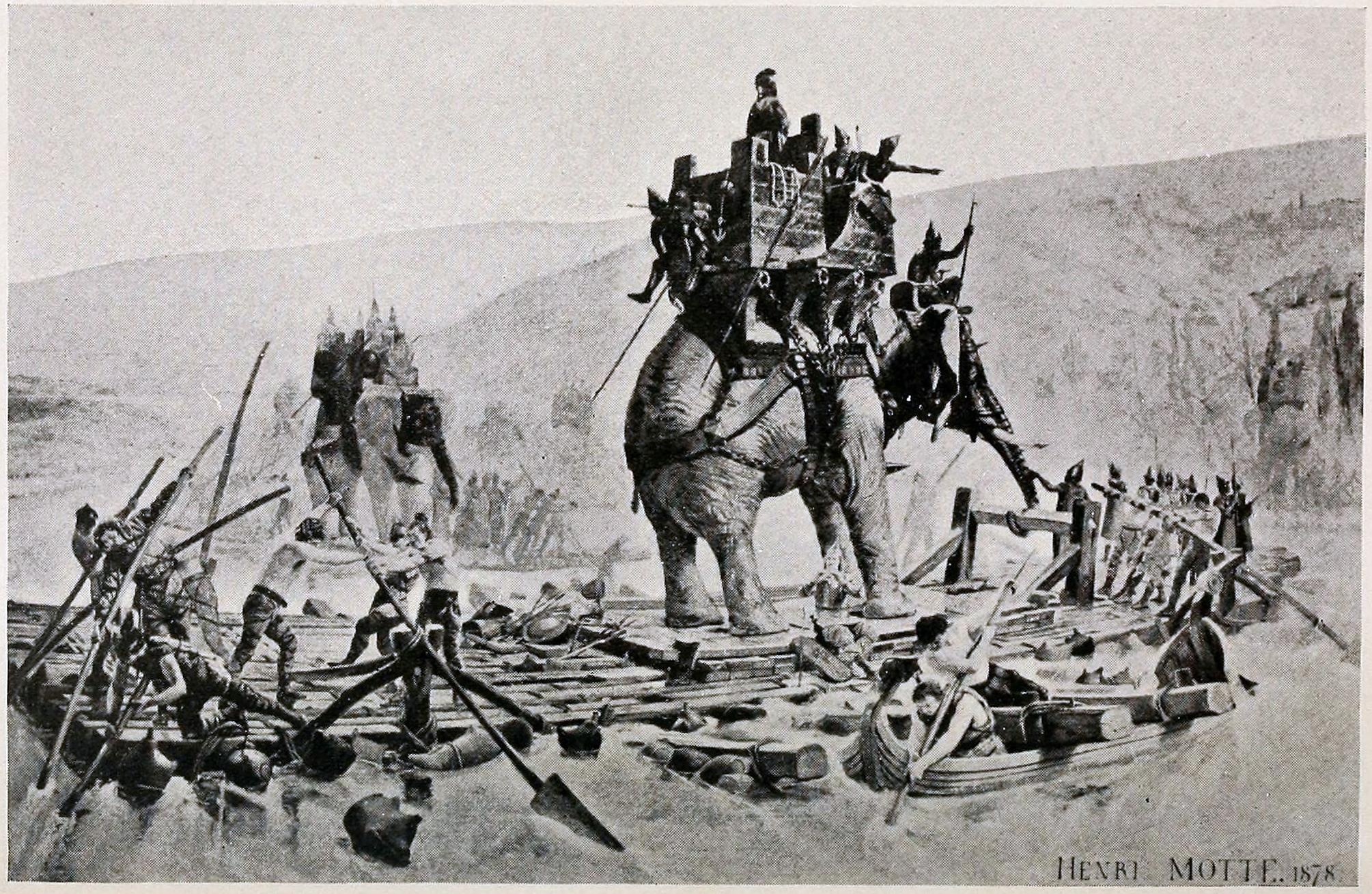
- Hannibal's army and their war elephants crossing the Rhône
Date	Late September 218 BC
Location	Debated location on the Rhône River, present-day France 44°08′18″N 4°48′35″E
Result	Carthaginian victory

Belligerents
Carthage	Volcae, a tribe of Gauls

Commanders and leaders
Hannibal	Unknown

Strength
38,000 infantry; 8,000 cavalry; 37 elephants	Unknown

Casualties and losses
Unknown	Unknown
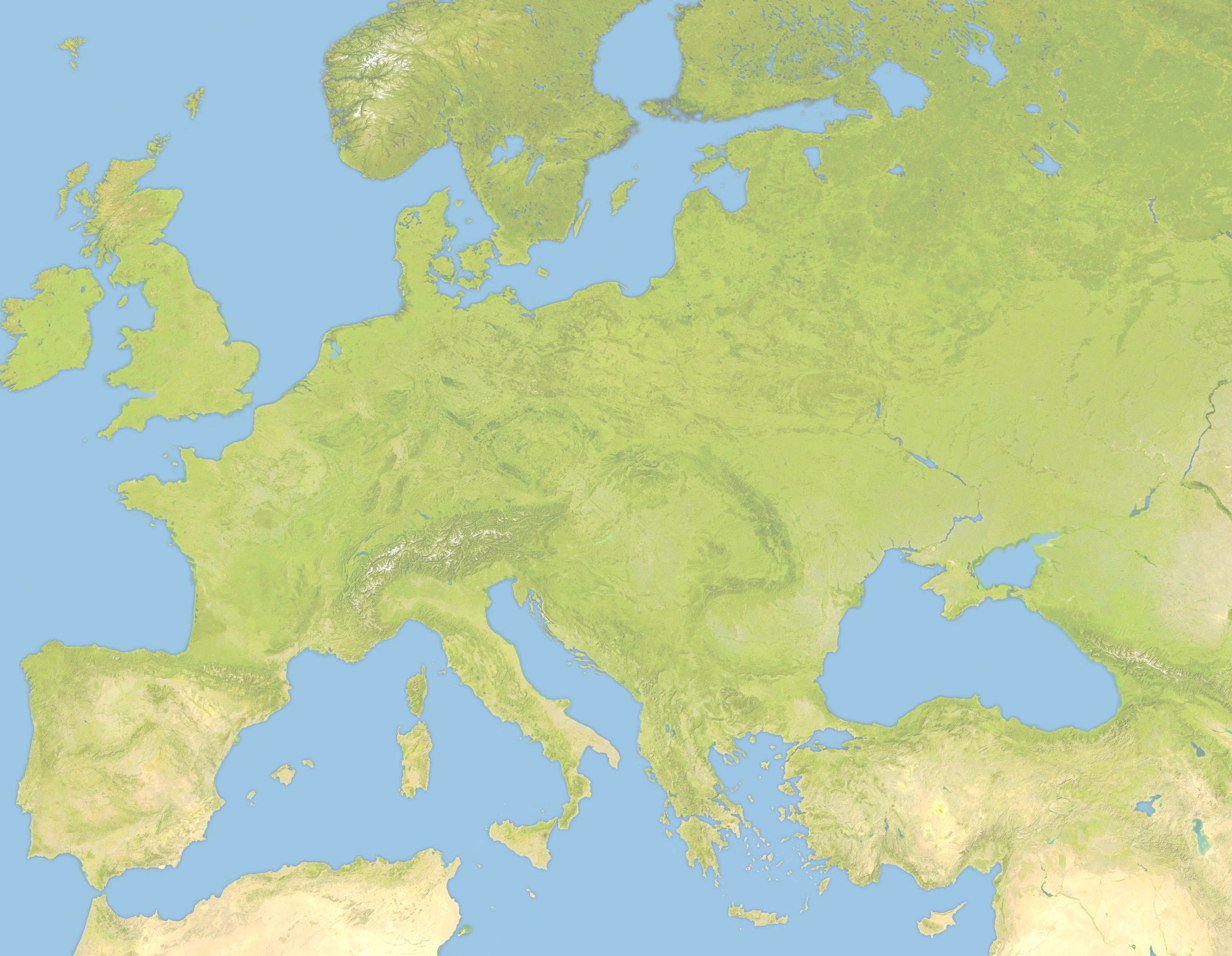
- Location within France Battle of the Rhône Crossing (Europe without the extreme north)

The Battle of the Rhône Crossing was a battle during the Second Punic War in September of 218 BC. Hannibal marched on the Italian Alps, and an army of Gallic Volcae attacked the Carthaginian army on the east bank of the Rhône. The Roman army camped near Massalia. The Volcae tried to prevent the Carthaginians from crossing the Alps and invading Italy.

Before they crossed the river, the Carthaginians sent a detachment to cross upriver, under Hanno, son of Bomilcar, and took up position behind the Gauls. Once the detachment was in place, Hannibal crossed the river with the main contingent of his army. As the Gauls massed to oppose Hannibal, Hanno attacked their rear and routed the Volcae army. This was Hannibal's first major battle (victory) outside of the Iberian Peninsula. It gave him an unopposed path to the Alps and into Italy.

== Background ==
=== Pre-war ===
The approximate extent of territory controlled by Rome and Carthage immediately before the start of the Second Punic War

Carthage and Rome fought through the First Punic War primarily for supremacy in North Africa and on the Mediterranean island of Sicily and in its surrounding waters. The war lasted 23 years, from 264 until 241 BC. It ended with the Treaty of Lutatius, under which Carthage evacuated Sicily and paid an indemnity of 3,200 talents over ten years. (Note: 3,200 talents was approximately 82,000 kg (81 long tons) of silver.) Four years later, Rome seized Sardinia and Corsica and imposed a further 1,200 talent indemnity. (Note: 1,200 talents was approximately 30,000 kg (30 long tons) of silver.) These seizures and the additional indemnity fuelled resentment in Carthage. Polybius considered this act of bad faith by the Romans as the single greatest cause of the war with Carthage breaking out again nineteen years later.

Shortly after the Roman breached the treaty, Carthaginian general Hamilcar Barca led many of his veterans to expand Carthaginian holdings in south-east Iberia (modern Spain and Portugal). Carthage gained silver mines, agricultural wealth, manpower, military facilities such as shipyards and territorial depth, which encouraged it to stand up to future Roman demands. Hamilcar ruled as viceroy and was succeeded by his son-in-law Hasdrubal, in the early 220s BC and then his son Hannibal, in 221 BC. In 226 BC, the Romans and Carthaginians signed the Ebro Treaty, declaring the Ebro River the northern boundary of the Carthaginian sphere of influence. Rome later made a separate treaty with Saguntum, south of the Ebro. In 218 BC, a Carthaginian army under Hannibal besieged, captured and sacked Saguntum. In spring 219 BC Rome declared war on Carthage.

== Roman preparations and strategy ==
As Hannibal had anticipated, Rome expected the Carthaginians to fight a defensive war with minor attacks in Sicily, and therefore planned to attack both Spain and Africa. Understanding that a simultaneous strike against both Spain and Carthage at the earliest opportunity would give Hannibal the opportunity to defeat their armies in detail, they planned first for Scipio to engage Hannibal either north of the Ebro or east of the Pyrenées or the Rhône, where he could receive aid from allied Iberians or Gauls, and after Scipio had located and engaged Hannibal's forces, Sempronius, stationed in Sicily, would invade Africa.

Due to the size and defences of the city of Carthage, it would take the Romans months to starve the city out through siege and blockade. Additionally, relief armies would have to be beaten off during the siege. Since 241 BC, Rome had not negotiated but instead dictated terms to Carthage, which had always backed down. The Romans most likely expected that Carthage was bluffing when it refused to accept terms, and would capitulate as soon a Roman army blockaded the city, or roused the Numidians and Libyans to rebel against Carthage. Carthage came close to capitulation in 256–55 BC when Marcus Atilius Regulus invaded Africa. If Scipio could keep Hannibal away from Africa for long enough, perhaps Sempronius could repeat the feat, or the opponents of the Barcids, some of whom had relations with Roman senators might assume power, or trigger the recall of Hannibal, and accept Roman demands.

The Roman navy had been mobilized in 219 BC, fielding 220 quinqueremes for the Second Illyrian War. It was the long-standing Roman procedure to elect two men each year, known as consuls, to each lead an army, and Rome in 218 BC decided to raise two consular armies and strike simultaneously at Iberia and Africa.

Consul Tiberius Sempronius Longus received instructions to sail for Africa escorted by 160 quinqueremes, with four legions: two Roman legions and two allied legions consisting of 8,000 Roman and 16,000 allied infantry, and 600 Roman and 1,800 allied horses.

Publius Cornelius Scipio, the other consul for 218 BC, received orders from the Senate to confront Hannibal in the theatre of either the Ebro or the Pyrenées. and received four cases legions (8,000 Roman and 14,000 allied infantry, 600 Roman and 1,600 allied horse) and was to sail for Iberia escorted by 60 ships. His brother Gnaeus accompanied him as a legate.

The consuls took office in March and began organizing their forces. However, before Scipio's army was ready, the Boii and the Insubres, two major Gallic tribes in Cisalpine Gaul (modern northern Italy), antagonized when several Roman colonies were established on traditionally Gallic territory, and perhaps enticed by agents of Hannibal, attacked the Roman colonies of Placentia and Cremona, causing the Romans to flee to Mutina, which the Gauls then besieged. This probably occurred in April or May of 218 BC.

The Roman Senate prioritized the defence of Italy over the overseas expedition, and Praetor Peregrinus Lucius Manlius Vulcavalrus, with 600 Roman horses, 10,000 allied infantry and 1,000 allied cavalries detached from Scipio's army, marched from Ariminium towards Cisalpine Gaul to the aid of the besieged Romans.

=== War in Cisalpine Gaul ===
The army of Manlius was ambushed twice as it marched from Ariminum towards Mutina, losing 1,200 men and six standards. Although they did relieve Mutina, the army fell under a loose siege a few miles from Mutina at Tannetum. The Roman Senate once more took one Roman and one allied legion (10,000 men) from the army of Scipio and sent them to the Po valley under the command of Praetor Urbanus Gaius Atillius Serranus. As Atillius neared Tannetum, the Gauls retreated without a fight, and the Romans spent the summer of 218 BC recovering and fortifying Placentia and Cremona, probably in a two-month-long operation.

Sempronius remained in Rome until June/July. His army acted as a strategic reserve should more troops be needed in Cisalpine Gaul. Rome did not respond to the Carthaginian naval raids against Sicily and Lipari. Hannibal's passivity and non-threatening defensive dispositions during March through May probably influenced this decision by reinforcing the Roman perception that they were fighting a repeat of the first war and the initiative lay with them. The Romans did not believe Hannibal would invade Italy, when they received the news, probably in July, that Hannibal had crossed the Ebro, they probably assumed Hannibal's Catalonia campaign was part of securing Spain by subduing pro-Roman tribes and creating a forward base. The Senate did not change the plan, Sempronius moved his forces to Sicily as planned, where he continued to prepare his African expedition at Lilybaeum and defend Sicily and Italy from several Carthaginian naval raids. Scipio raised and trained two Roman legions and awaited for allied troops to arrive in Rome to replace the troops taken from him, and thus could not set out for Iberia until September. and as a result, the departure of Scipio was delayed by two to three months.

== Punic preparations and strategy ==
During the First Punic War, the Romans dictated the pace of the war by taking the initiative and attacked Carthaginian positions. Carthage normally reacted to the Roman attacks. Hannibal planned to carry the war overland to Italy to deter the expected Roman invasion of Spain and Africa and dismember the Roman confederation. Hannibal's overland approach to Italy was a high-risk strategy, and failure might have cost Carthage the war, but he was forced to choose this option given the strategic limitations the Carthaginian empire faced in 218 BC, and it had a chance of succeeding. An overland invasion would have the advantage of surprise while sailing to Italy might have been faster and safer from hazards of a land march, but Roman naval dominance (Note: In 218 BC, Rome had commissioned 220 Quinqueremes, while Carthage had 32 quinqueremes manned in Spain and another 55 in Carthage. The largest fleet Carthage would launch during the war would have 130 quinqueremes, in 212 BC.) increased the risk to Hannibal's armada, (Note: Scipio Africanus sailed to Africa in 204 BC with 2,200 cavalry and 26,000 infantry, and needed 400 transports to carry them to Africa through seas dominated by the Roman fleet. Hannibal, would need at least double the number of transports and four times the horse transports to carry at least 50,000 infantry, 9,000 cavalry, and 37 elephants.) of crippling losses from Roman naval attacks despite Carthaginian warship escorts, and ships could also be lost in storms en route to Italy. Fleets normally sailed along the coast and beached at night or after every 2/3 days for victuals. Carthage had no bases on the coast between the Balearic Islands and Italy, which was dominated by Roman ally Massalia and her colonies and wild Ligurians, and the Romans controlled Sardinia, Corsica, and Sicily, and thus effectively controlled the coast between Spain and Italy, so a sea voyage would have been more dangerous than a land route. Last, enough horse transports to carry 9,000 horses to Italy might not have been available for Hannibal. (Note: Before Hannibal left Italy in 203 BC, he was forced to build ships to augment the fleet Carthage had sent, and kill 3,000-4,000 horses because there were no transports available to carry them. These horses would have given Hannibal superiority in cavalry, 8,000 against 6,100 against Scipio at Zama in 202 BC.)

Hannibal needed to time his movements carefully to keep the Romans in the dark. If the Romans got a hint of his intentions, they had enough resources to fight a multi-front war, by sending one army to block his army at the Pyrenees, stationing a strong force in Cisalpine Gaul, and invading Africa with another, or stand on the defensive with overwhelming forces. After the successful conclusion of the Siege of Saguntum, Hannibal did nothing to provoke the Romans, dismissed his army, and did not immediately march for Italy in the spring of 218BC after he received the news of the war. He spent the months of March to May strengthening the defences of Spain and Africa by garrisoning these areas which were not threatening to the Roman mainland and served a dual purpose, along with securing the areas against the expected Roman invasion it also reinforced the Roman perception that Carthage would fight a defensive war along the lines of the First Punic War, so the overland invasion caught Rome off guard.

=== Carthaginian deployments ===
Hannibal stationed Hasdrubal Barca, his younger brother, at the head of 12,650 infantry: 2,550 cavalries (11,580 African foot, 300 Ligurians, 500 Balearic slingers, 450 Liby-Phoenician 300 Spanish Ilergetes, and 1,800 Numidian horse from the Masaesyli, Massylii, Mauri and Maccoei tribes) and 21 elephants to guard the Carthaginian possession horses of the Ebro. Hannibal sent 20,000 Iberian soldiers to Africa (including 13,850 and 1,200-foot horses from the Mastiani, Thersitae, Olcades and Orestes tribes, and 870 Balearic slingers), and 4,000 soldiers garrisoning Carthage itself, probably between March-May. Hasdrubal and Carthage could raise additional soldiers if needed to fight Romans, and Carthage was unlikely to fall to a single consular army in a few months. (Note: A disarmed Carthage withstood a three year siege during the Third Punic War, while Scipio Africanus needed to campaign for two years in Africa before Carthage submitted.)

Hannibal left Cartagena in late May or early June, timing his departure to allow the spring flooding of Spanish rivers to subside. He ensured the availability of food and fodder along the way, and after receiving envoys from Gallic tribes from the Po valley, who assured him of their willingness to cooperate against the Romans. Hannibal's army consisted of either 90,000 foot and 12,000 cavalries, or 77,000 foot and 10,000 horse, or with 26,000 foot and 10,000 horse, and 37 elephants. The elephants were reported by Appian. There is no mention of the elephants by Polybius or Livy, so there is speculation that the elephants may have been carried to Emporiae by sea. The Iberian contingent of the Punic navy, which numbered 50 quinqueremes (only 32 were manned) and five triremes, remained in Iberian waters, having shadowed Hannibal's army for some way. The army probably marched in smaller columns along a 5-7 miles long stretch and the 290 miles march to the Ebro, during which they crossed the Sucor river, and five major streams, which were uneventful, and the river was reached in the middle of July.

=== Carthaginian campaign across the Ebro ===
A generic representation of the strategic situation during Hannibal's Catalonia campaign, July–August 218 BC, not to exact scale

The Carthaginian Army crossed the Ebro River in three columns. The northernmost crossed at the confluence of the Ebro and Sicoris River and then proceeded along the river valley into the mountain countries. The central column crossed the Ebro at the oppidum of Mora and marched inland. The main column under Hannibal, along with the treasure chest and elephants, crossed the Ebro at the town of Edeba and proceeded directly along the coast through Tarraco, Barcino, Gerunda, Emporiae and Illiberis. The separate detachments marched in a way to provide mutual support if needed, and the coastal detachment under Hannibal was also tasked with countering any possible Roman intervention.

Hannibal spent the months of July and August of 218BC crossing the two hundred miles from the Ebro River to the Pyrenées, conquering the area by campaigning against the "Illurgetes”, perhaps not the Ilergetes at Llerida who were pro-Carthaginian, but another obscure tribe between Tarraco and Barcino, the Bargusii at Serga valley, the Ausetani between Vich and Gerona along with the Lacetani, the Aeronosii, and the Andosini tribes. Hannibal stormed several unspecified cities and this campaign aimed to subdue the region as quickly as possible, leading to heavy Carthaginian casualties. (Note: Hannibal had lost 22,000 soldiers in the space of two months, possibly to the desertion of raw recruits and to the heavy losses incurred while storming walled cities.) After subduing the Iberian tribes, but leaving the Greek cities unmolested, Hannibal reorganized his army. A general named Hanno, who has been identified by various authors as Hannibal's nephew (son of Hasdrubal the Fair), a brother, or no Barcid relation, garrisoned the newly conquered territory north of the Eboo with 10,000 infantry and 1,000 cavalries and based himself to specifically watch over the Bargusii, a pro-Roman tribe. Hanno also guarded the communication lines with Hasdrubal Barca, and the heavy baggage left by Hannibal near a camp at Cissa. Hannibal next released 3,000 Carpetani soldiers, along with 7,000 other warriors of dubious loyalty, so the Carthaginian army now numbered 50,000 infantry and 9,000 cavalry and 37 elephants. The Carthaginian detachments next crossed the Pyrenees into Gaul and regrouped at Illiberis in early September of 218 BC. They probably avoided the coastal road, as it contains many forested gorges and moved either through the Col de Banyuls or the Col du Perthus or Col de la Perche, avoiding the Greeks on the coast altogether.

Hannibal had taken almost three months to move from Cartagena to the Pyrenees. The reason for this is probably Hannibal first waited for news of Roman deployments, and then marched slowly so the Romans had time to invade Spain and meet defeat, also give the impression of a difficult march through Iberia to the Romans before marching for Italy. Hannibal's strategic goal of securing Spain was foiled, because the arrival of Scipio to Spain was delayed by three months due to the revolt of Boii and Insubres in the summer of 218 BC.

== Prelude ==
A generic representation of the strategic situation during Hannibal's crossing of the Rhone, in mid-September 218 BC, not to exact scale

Hannibal had created a more mobile, loyal, battle-hardened, and experienced army by shedding unwilling troops and most of his heavy baggage, which also reduced his supply and provisioning burden by decreasing the number of soldiers, pack animals and size of the baggage train but increased the need to forage. Hannibal probably now abandoned any thoughts of fighting the Romans as the season was getting late and focused on quickly reaching Italy. (Note: Hannibal spent almost 3 months marching from Cartagena to the Pyrenees, however, the Carthaginians would take three weeks to reach the Rhône and another 5 weeks to cross the Alps.) Hannibal had sounded out the Volcae, the Salyes and the Allobroges regarding safe passage for Carthaginian arms before he departed from Iberia, and had enlisted the cooperation of the Boii and Insubres of Po Valley to ensure provisions and reinforcements awaited him after crossing the Alps when he was at his most vulnerable point. The Gaesatae was contacted but to hide his true intentions, Hannibal only sounded out the Gauls between Pyrenees and Rhône about the possible passage of Carthaginians through their lands, but not for an alliance, and the Iberians west of the Pyrenees was not courted.

The Carthaginians now faced a 160-mile march through the territory of several Gallic tribes, most grouped under a confederation called the Volcae, who were divided into two subgroups, the Volcae Tectosages and the Volcae Arecomici, before they reached the Rhône River. The tribes were divided over granting Carthaginians safe passage, and as the Carthaginians regrouped, the Gauls mustered their forces and their leaders met at Ruscino for discussion, Hannibal met and placated the Gallic chieftains with assurances of his peaceful intentions accompanied by generous gifts, then marched past Ruscino unmolested, and probably marched along with the future Via Domitia towards Nemasus, the Volcae capital, and without any incidents reached the west bank of the Rhône by late September. Hannibal's negotiation skills and war chest was put to good use to placate individual Gallic tribes on the way, so the foraging of the Carthaginians caused no friction, supplies may also have been purchased from the Gauls as no reports exist of any fighting taking place during his march. Hannibal's army numbered 38,000 infantry, 8,000 cavalry and 37 elephants at this point. (Note: The Carthaginian army numbers had decreased by 13,000 soldiers after the army crossed the Pyrenees. Hannibal may have released soldiers (probably garrison duty) besides losing some soldiers to desertion, disease, and accidents, so his army became more mobile, and given that the poor foraging conditions across the Alps, he also reduced the logistical challenge of keeping his soldiers fed in that region, as the Carthaginians were more dependent of foraging after leaving most of their heavy baggage in Spain.)

=== Gauls oppose Carthaginian river crossing ===
The Carthaginians found a Gallic army awaiting them on the eastern bank of the river. Those Volcae who opposed granting the Carthaginians safe passage had crossed the river and gathered on the eastern bank, and they may have been joined by the Cavari, whom Massilia (modern Marseille), might have influenced to oppose the Carthaginians. The Gauls had fortified a camp on the far side of the river, and were waiting for Hannibal's army to cross. (Note: At the time, the Gallic tribes that inhabited the eastern bank of the river were the Sallyas, who lived next to the territory of Massalia, the Cavari, a Gallic tribal confederation who lived to their north, the Vocontii to the north of the Cavari and the Allobroges to the north of the Vocontii.) The Carthaginians rested for three days after reaching the riverbank, while Hannibal contacted the neighbouring Gallic tribes, and aided by their pre-existing distrust for the Romans, persuaded them to aid him in his crossing of the river. The Carthaginians purchased several boats that were capable of making trips at sea along with other boats/canoes of all sorts, while the natives aided in building new boats and rafts. For two days Carthaginians commenced their raft/boat building and gathering loudly in full sight of the Gauls, as these were designed to fix their attention away from their northern flank and focus their attention across the river, masking the flanking move Hannibal was devising against them.

=== Outflanking the Gauls ===
Hannibal put Hanno, son of Bomilcar, in charge of a mobile column made up of infantry and cavalry on the third night, before starting the boat building, and sent this force north upriver under cover of darkness to find another suitable crossing place. Led by local guides, Hanno located a crossing about 25 miles (40 km) to the north of the Carthaginian camp near an "island", that divided the Rhône into two small streams and decided to cross the river at that location. His force hid and rested during the fourth day, then Hanno ordered that boats and rafts to be constructed from materials that were at hand. The Carthaginian detachment chopped down trees, lashing the logs together with reliable ropes they had brought with them from the army's stores. Some of the Spanish fighters, which composed most of his forces probably on the account of being their best swimmers, crossed the river with their shields over-inflated animal skins, while others crossed the river on the hastily built boats and rafts. Hanno occupied a strong position, again concealed his detachment during the following day, and then moved south on the following night (the second night after leaving the main army) towards the Gallic camp under cover of darkness. Hanno's force arrived behind a tributary of the Rhône crossed and took position on a hill behind the Gallic camp before dawn, and then gave the previously agreed upon signal by lighting a beacon and using smoke to let Hannibal know that his force had arrived in position at dawn. The leadership qualities of Hanno and the skill and discipline of the Carthaginians are evident from the fact that they had managed to pull off this whole operation undetected and unobserved by the Gauls, which was crucial to its success.

== Opposing armies ==
=== Carthaginian army ===
The Carthaginian army at Rhone numbered 38,000 feet and 8,000 horses, and a corps of 37 elephants. Carthage normally recruited mercenaries from various nations to augment a core of citizen soldiers and officers, Hannibal's army was no exception, the uniting factor for the Carthaginian army was the personal tie each group had with Hannibal. The cavalry arm contained at least 4,000 Numidian and 2,000 Iberians among the 8,000 troops, since these were the numbers that had survived the crossing of the Alps to reach Italy. The balance may have come from Numidians, Iberians, Celtiberians, Lusitanians, Gaetulians and Libyan-Phoenicians.

The Numidian cavalry were very lightly equipped, they rode short hardy ponies which were ridden bareback, wore no armor, carried javelins and a small hide bossless shields, and a short dagger or axe for close-quarters combat. The Gaetulian cavalry were equipped in similar fashion as the Numidians. Although Numidian cavalry was outclassed by Roman Cavalry in close-quarters fighting, they normally fought in loose groups and were excellent skirmishers. The heavier Iberian cavalry may have included Celtiberians and Lusitanians along with other Spanish tribes among their numbers. carried round shields, swords, javelins, and thrusting spears. Along with iron or bronze helmets and short purple bordered tunics, some of the cavalry may have carried small round shields, two javelins and a falcata, and wore no body armor, while others wore cuirasses, large oval shields, and a thrusting spear along with swords, acting as genuine shock troops. Celtiberian and Lusitanian horsemen wore mail-shirts and carried small round shields along with javelins and slashing swords.

When Hannibal reached Italy after crossing the Alps, he had 12,000 African and 8,000 Iberian infantry along with 8,000 light troops, so the 38,000 infantry present at the Rhone included these soldiers in their ranks as well. The Iberian contingent probably held Celtiberians and Lusitanians along with Iberians. The African or Libyan infantry wore helmets and mail carried circular or oval shields with a metal boss, spears, and swords, which were probably modeled after the Spanish falcata, while the light infantry wore short-sleeved tunics, carried javelins and a small round hide shield. The light infantry was used for skirmishing while their heavier counterpart probably fought in a phalanx formation, or as swordsmen.

The Iberian infantry fought with falcatas, wore no armor over their purple bordered dazzling white tunics, and carried large oval shields and a heavy javelin, and often wore a crested helmet made of animal sinews, while the light infantry carried a smaller shield and several javelins. Celtiberians and Lusitanians used straight gladii, as well as javelins and various types of spears. Celtiberians wore black cloaks, carried wicker shields covered in hide or light shields similar to what the Gauls used, wore sinew greaves and bronze, red-crested helmets, while the Lusitanian skirmishers wore sinew helmets and linen cuirasses, and aside from swords, carried small shields and several javelins.

Aside from the Numidian, Iberian, Libyan and Lusitanian light troops, Hannibal also had an auxiliary skirmisher contingent consisting of 1,000–2,000 Balearic slingers. The Carthaginians also famously employed the war elephants which Hannibal had brought over the Alps; North Africa had indigenous African forest elephants at the time. (Note: These elephants were typically about 2.5 metres (8 ft) at the shoulder, and should not be confused with the larger African bush elephant.) The sources are not clear as to whether they carried towers containing fighting men.

=== Gauls ===
The Gauls were brave, fierce warriors who fought in tribes and clans in massed infantry formation, but lacked the discipline of their Roman and Carthaginian opponents. The Infantry wore no armor, fought naked or stripped to the waist in plaid trousers and a loose cloak, a variety of metal bossed different size and shaped shields made of oak or linden covered with leather and iron slashing swords. Chieftains, Noblemen, and their retainers made up the cavalry, wore helmets and mail, and used thrusting spears and swords. Both Cavalry and Infantry carried spears and javelins for close quarter and ranged combat.

== Battle ==
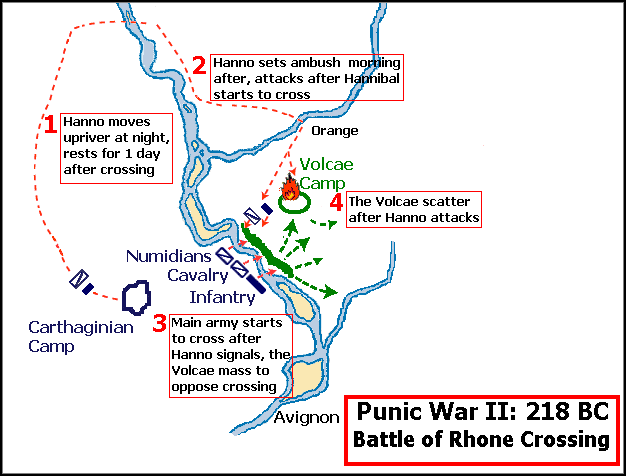
Battle of Rhone Crossing, 90 km from the mouth of the Rhone

Hannibal, upon seeing Hanno's signal, immediately ordered his army to launch the boats. Hanno, upon seeing Hannibal's army launching their boats, prepared to attack the Gauls. Hannibal had planned 1,000 yard river crossing carefully, having spent five days analyzing this dangerous operation from every angle, ensuring that as little as possible was left to chance. Large boats, some carrying Numidian cavalry were launched furthest upstream, while similar boats carrying dismounted cavalry crossed below them, with three or four horses in tow, tied to their boats and some horses were put on boats fully saddled and ready for immediate use, so that, once they debouched from the river, they could cover the infantry and the rest of the army while it formed up to attack the barbarians. These boats took the brunt of the river's current and buffeted the mobile infantry in canoes than were placed below them. Some soldiers may have crossed the river by swimming. Hannibal himself was among the first to cross, while the rest of the Carthaginian army assembled on the western bank and cheered their comrades while they waited their turn to cross.

The Gauls, seeing the boats being launched, massed on the eastern riverbank to oppose the Carthaginians, roaring war cries and brandishing their spears and beating their shields The opposing soldiers shouted and jeered at each other while the Carthaginians were in the midst of crossing, while Hanno began to cross the river behind the Gaul camp and organize his troops on the other bank unobserved by the Gauls. Just as the Carthaginian boats approached the riverbank and the Gauls were fully focused on the Carthaginian boats, Hanno launched his corps, majority of his soldiers hit the Gauls in the flank and rear just as Hannibal's group established a foothold on the eastern bank, while a small detachment of Hanno's force set the Gallic camp on fire. Some of the Gauls rushed to defend their camp, but the majority were paralyzed before they clashed with Hannibal's troops, then retreated pell-mell away almost immediately after light resistance from the carefully arrayed advancing Carthaginian phalanx, leaving the field to the Carthaginians.

=== Battle site location ===
Historians disagree on the specific location of the battle site, identifying various locations starting from Bourg Saint-Andéol (De Beer, 1969, p. 122-3), Beaucaire and Fourques on the Rhône, based on different hypotheses. Polybius (3.42.1) identified the battle site as being a four-days march from the sea. Assuming a 12–16 kilometres (7.5–9.9 mi) march limit per day for the Carthaginian army, the site is likely between Avignon and Orange, upstream of the Durance river, based on the probable ancient coastline, which has advanced further south because of silting from the Rhône since 218 BC.

== Romans on the Rhône ==
While Hannibal was engaged crossing the Rhone, Publius Scipio, who could not set out from Rome before late August or early September, two to three months behind schedule due to raising fresh levies from scratch to replace the troops sent to Cisalpine Gaul, had arrived on the Rhône estuary. His army had marched 165 miles north to Pisae, from Rome, then boarded ships and sailed to the easternmost mouth of the Rhône after a 5-day journey. Scipio knew that Hannibal had crossed the Ebro before he sailed and had assumed that the Carthaginians were still engaged beyond the Pyrenees, so he disembarked his troops, made camp, unloaded his heavy baggage, and allowed his soldiers to recuperate from their sea voyage. Scipio expected Hannibal to fight his way to the Rhône, and arrive exhausted and weakened, so he did not send out scouts to find out exactly where the Carthaginian army was as he believed Hannibal was many days march away. He was astonished to learn from Massalia that Hannibal was already across the Pyrenees, amazed by the speed of the Carthaginian march) and approaching the Rhône.

Scipio immediately dispatched 300 cavalries along with local guides and a troop of Gallic auxiliaries hired by Massalia up the eastern bank of the river, unaware that Hannibal's army was only four days march upstream, just as Hannibal was not aware of the Roman army. Scipio still believed Hannibal was many days away, his goal was probably to locate crossing sites where he could make a stand against Hannibal.

== Crossing the Rhône ==
Hannibal, unaware of the Roman scouts bearing down on him, began to ferry his troops, pack animals, and baggage across using the boats, rafts, and canoes in relays, by nightfall most of the army except the elephants had crossed over and a camp was firmly established. to ferry the elephants across, the Carthaginians constructed special rafts covered with dirt, then soldiers pulled the rafts with cables to ferry all 37 elephants across over three days, it is unclear if some had crossed on the day of the battle. Some frightened animals jumped into the water from their rafts, leading to their drivers drowning in the river, but the animals managed to reach the opposite bank.

Hannibal Crosses the Rhône, 218 BC

Hannibal learned that a Roman Army and fleet had arrived at the mouth of the Rhône, probably from the Gallic envoys who had come from the Po valley, on the day after the battle. Hannibal dispatched 500 Numidian horses immediately on a scouting mission to the south, then held a troop review and harangued his men, and introduced Magilus, and some other Gallic chiefs of the Po Valley to his soldiers. Speaking through an interpreter, Magilus spoke of the support that the recently conquered Padane Gauls had for the Carthaginians and their mission of destroying Rome. Hannibal then addressed the officers himself. The troops' enthusiasm was uplifted by Hannibal's inspiring address.

The Numidians blundered into a force of 300 Roman cavalries from the army of Publius Cornelius Scipio and a contingent of Gallic mercenaries hired by Massalia a few miles south of the camp. In a sharp skirmish, they lost 240 men, while the Romans lost 140. The Numidians fell back to the camp, and the Romans rode to the edge of the Carthaginian camp and scouted their enemy before successfully making it back to the Roman camp near the mouth of the Rhône. (Note: it is possible that The Numidian Cavalry, which would outperform their Roman counterparts in Italy in the future, were either surprised or caught at a disadvantage, or simply fell back because they were on scouting and not a combat mission,) Hannibal now had the chance to attack the Romans and ensure the security of Spain, or march away towards the Alps, risking a Roman pursuit and battle in unknown territory. Hannibal had contemplated fighting the Romans but decided against it, so he may have ordered the Numidians to draw the Romans to his camp. Hannibal may have wished to give the impression that he had not fully crossed as his elephants were still on the other side, so Scipio would march to engage him, giving the Carthaginians the chance to fight on the ground of their own choosing, or march further away. If Scipio chased him, Hannibal could still ambush the Romans, if Scipio marched back, the eight-day march would give Hannibal a crucial head start towards Italy.

== Option of Hannibal: fight or flight? ==
A generic representation of the route Hannibal and Publius Scipio took to the Po Valley 218 BC, not to exact scale.

Hannibal had considered fighting Scipio, but ultimately had decided to march for Italy across the Alps, as a brilliant tactical victory might lead to a strategic defeat by forcing him to winter in Gaul. Hannibal did not know the size of the Roman army or its location, even if his total force was at par two Roman consular armies (38,000 foot. 8,000 horse and 37 elephants against 46,000 foot and 4600 horse) and he was vastly superior in the cavalry arm and was confident of victory, however, his soldiers were tired from the recent battle and river crossing, battle casualties would diminish his numbers and the wounded would slow down his march, and the delay might force him to winter in Gaul, risking Gallic attacks on his weakened army and running short of supplies, as Hannibal was dependent on foraging. The Romans, meanwhile, now alert of this position and intention, would mass large forces in Po to attack him when he arrived in Italy. Lastly, the terrain near the river was flat and yielded no tactical advantage for the Carthaginians to exploit. (Note: Hannibal's Spanish and African troops were his most reliable and efficient soldiers and he always sought to minimize their loss and rarely fought a battle of attrition since he was far from reinforcements from Africa and Spain, at the battles of Trebbia, LakeTrasimene and Cannae, Hannibal used battle formations, ambush and terrain features to maximum effect and also ensured that his newly recruited Gauls took the bulk of the casualties. Hannibal had no expendable Gallic contingent at Rhône.) Scipio also might have Gauls supporting his army and a Carthaginian defeat would have meant the end of Hannibal's invasion, so Hannibal decided to march for the Alps.

Publius Scipio, as anticipated by Hannibal, after his scouts reported Hannibal's location, immediately loaded his heavy baggage on his ships, marshaled his legions, and with all due haste marched north to confront the Carthaginians. However, when the Romans reached the Carthaginian campsite, Scipio found a deserted camp and locals informed him that Hannibal's army was three day's march away. Scipio was again amazed that Hannibal decided to cross the Alps as autumn was ending, but he probably did not contemplate chasing after the Carthaginians, it might not be possible to overtake the Carthaginians as they had a sizable head start, and Scipio did not know Hannibal's route, and the Roman army was not equipped and provisioned for a winter campaign. Forced marching blindly into unknown territory to catch Hannibal risked being ambushed by Hannibal or hostile Gallic tribes. In an exhausted state, the army had a few days of supplies, all heavy baggage was in their ships, no arrangements had been made with Massalia for provisions, foraging would slow the army down and make it impossible to catch the Carthaginians, the Alps had little food or forage and the Carthaginians would have cleaned the area they passed through of food and fodder as Hannibal's men were also depended on foraging, making it impossible for the Romans to live off the land. Scipio concluded that Hannibal was heading towards Italy and turned south towards Massalia. The race for Italy had begun.

== Aftermath: the race for Italy ==
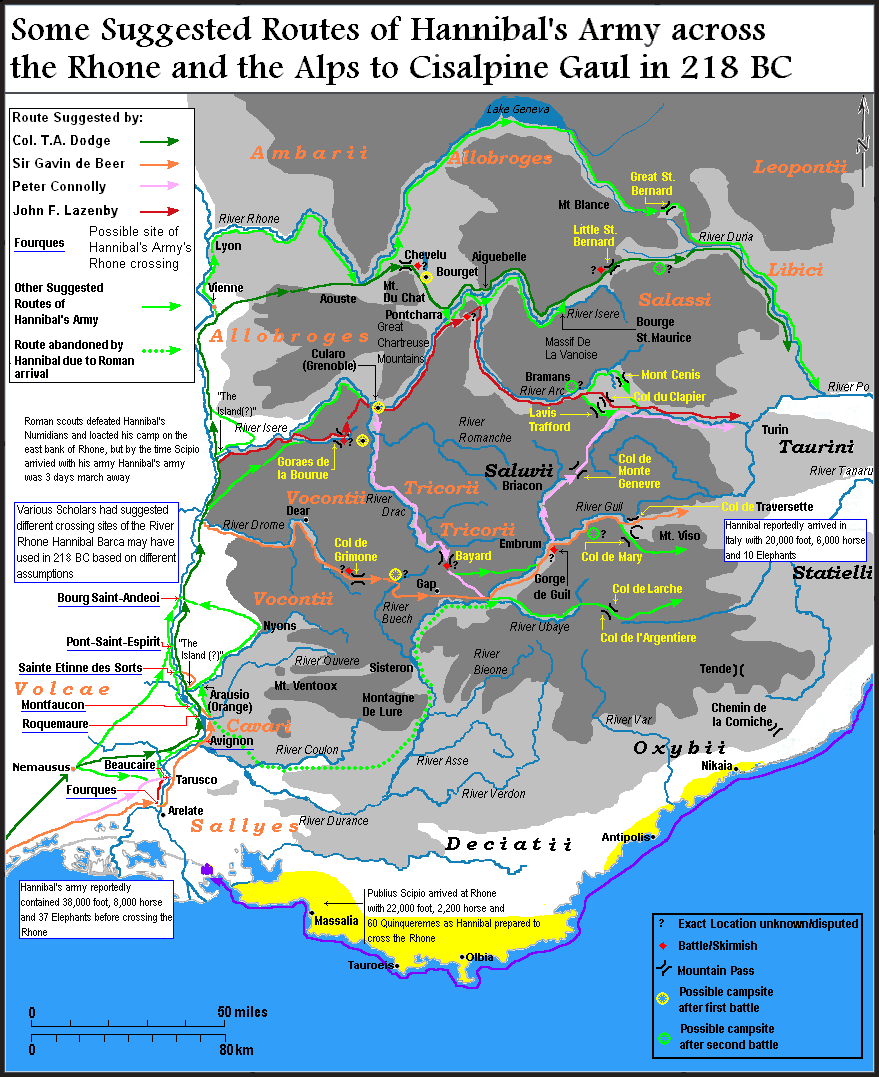
A generic representation of possible routes of Hannibal's army across the Alps 218 BC, not to exact scale

Hannibal had expected Scipio to march up the Rhône to engage him, if the Romans followed after him, Hannibal would have the opportunity to ambush the Romans, if Scipio turned back to Massalia, the eight-day roundtrip would give the Carthaginians a crucial head start towards Italy, and should Scipio's army then head back to the Po valley, the threat to Spain would be eliminated without fighting a battle. The day after the skirmish, Hannibal deployed his cavalry southward to screen his army from any Roman intervention, while his infantry marched north, the baggage train moved north the following day. The elephants completed their crossing on the following day, and Hannibal led the elephants, his cavalry, and rearguard north to cross the Alps. Hannibal's crossing of the Alps in 218 BC was one of the major events of the Second Punic War, and one of the most celebrated achievements of any military force in ancient warfare. The exact route Hannibal took is subject to debate and discussion among scholars, in 1891, Historian Theodore Ayrault Dodge found 350 distinct work on the subject, and in the hundred-plus years since then, more opinions have emerged, and one historian, humorously commented before 1914 that he would need 100 years to cover the existing literature on Hannibal's Alpine crossing.

It is known that Hannibal took an estimated four to five weeks to cross the Alps, faced harsh conditions and attacks from Gallic tribes, losing up to 20,000 soldiers and the majority of his pack animals before he reached Italy. (Note: Hannibal had 38,000 foot and 8,000 horses at Rhône, he arrived in Italy with at least 20,000 foot and 6,000 horse, and possibly another 8,000 light troops, a loss of 12,000 to 20,000 African and Iberian soldiers, in contrast, casualties among these troops were much lower in the Battle of Trebbia, the LakeTrasimene and the Cannae combined.) Hannibal did not have time to bribe the Gauls for safe passage as the season was getting late and lost men to hostile action also, in stark contrast to the crossing of Hasdrubal Barca in 207 BC, who might have paid for safe passage through the Alps. Hannibal rested his battered army for a few days, and to his annoyance, found no Gallic army with supplies awaiting to join him as the Gallic chiefs had promised. He tried to persuade the Taurini to join him, and failing that, attacked their chief town, took it after a three-day siege, and put the survivors to the sword, securing provisions for his army and Gauls now began to rally to him.

=== Journey of Scipio ===
Scipio had marched south for four days and embarked his army onto the fleet, then took a decision that would have major strategic impact on the war. Having failed in his mission to stop Hannibal in Spain or Gaul, he resolved to fight Hannibal to carry out his orders, but instead of going to Italy with his army, as Hannibal might have hoped, he sent his older brother Gnaeus Scipio with the bulk of his forces to Spain to establish a Roman presence and prevent any reinforcements from reaching Hannibal, also ensuring the fame and fortune of the campaign goes to the Scipio family. Publius Scipio probably had enough support in the Roman Senate to be immune from being prosecuted for deserting his army, so he with a small escort began the 1,000-mile journey to Italy to take command of the Roman forces in the Po valley, he intended to attack the Carthaginians when they emerge from the passes, exhausted, diminished in numbers, and at their weakest.

Publius Scipio probably sailed for five days from Massalia to Pisa by sea, after making a stopover at Genoa. Scipio informed the Roman Senate, after reaching Pisa, of the situation and his intention to take command of the Roman forces in the Po Valley. Scipio marched across Etruria and reached Po Valley ahead of Hannibal, but he did not press on to head Hannibal off at the pass. Firstly, the Roman forces available to him were not fully trained, and demoralized from their mauling by the Gauls, Scipio needed to arrange supplies for the campaign, he did not have adequate forces to move into hostile territory and risk being attacked and cut off by the Gauls, and most importantly, the area was unknown to Romans so Scipio did not know exactly which pass the Carthaginians were most likely emerge from. If the Romans blockaded the wrong pass, they risked Hannibal linking up unhindered with the hostile Gauls and trapping Scipio's army. Scipio spent his time organizing his army and supply chain, and despite arriving in Italy before Hannibal, reached Placentia the day Hannibal took Turin. The Senate, aware that the only organized military forces between Hannibal and Rome were four ill-trained demoralized legions, decided to raise two legions to garrison Rome, and would eventually recall Sempronius to aid Scipio, this eliminating the threat of invasion against Carthage for the next 14 years as Hannibal had hoped.

== Hannibal's vanishing soldiers ==
Hannibal might have mobilized 137,000 (Hannibal's army: 102,000 troops, Hasdrubal's 15,000, army in Africa: 20,000) soldiers before setting out for Italy. After subduing the lands north of Ebro in Catalonia, Hannibal left Hanno there with 11,000 soldiers, and released another 10,000 troops from service. Hannibal's army numbered 59,000 soldiers when he crossed the Pyrenees. It seems that 22,000 soldiers had vanished since crossing the Ebro, without any information being available about their specific fate. On the Rhône, Hannibal had 46,000 soldiers available; another 13,000 had disappeared although the army had fought no battles between the Pyrenees and the Rhône. When the Carthaginian army finally reached Italy, it supposedly numbered 26,000 (Polybius 3.56.4). The Punic army had lost 75% of its starting strength during the journey to Italy. The cause of this drastic reduction is speculated as: large scale desertion by recruits, high casualties suffered north of the Ebro from direct assaults on walled towns, garrisoning of parts of Gaul, severe winter conditions faced on the Alps, and the unreliability of the figures given by Polybius.

Hans Delbruck proposed another hypothesis: Hannibal had mobilized a total of 82,000 troops, not 137,000. After leaving 26,000 in Iberia (with Hasdrubal Barca and Hanno), and releasing 10,000 before crossing the Pyrenees, he arrived in Italy with at least 34,000 soldiers. The balance was lost in battles or to the Alpine elements. The basis of this theory is:

- Hannibal received no Iberian/African troops as reinforcements before 215 BC, when Bomilcar landed 4,000 Numidians at Locri.
- At the Battle of Trebia, there is mention of 8,000 slingers and other light infantry of non Celtic/Gaulish or Italian origins.

Given that Hannibal had at least 6,000 cavalry, 20,000 heavy infantry and 8,000 light infantry before the Gauls joined him, a total of 34,000 troops when he reached Italy. This means that the Carthaginian army had still lost 25% of its starting strength on the march to Italy.

== Citations ==
=== Sources ===
- Bagnall, Nigel (1999). The Punic Wars: Rome, Carthage and the Struggle for the Mediterranean. London: Pimlico. ISBN 978-0-7126-6608-4.
- Baker, G. P. (1999). Hannibal. Cooper Square Press. ISBN 0-8154-1005-0.
- Bath, Tony (1981). Hannibal's Campaigns. Barns & Nobles, New York. ISBN 0-88029-817-0.
- Collins, Roger (1998). Spain: An Oxford Archaeological Guide. Oxford University Press. ISBN 978-0-19-285300-4.
- Cottrell, Leonard (1992). Hannibal: Enemy of Rome. Da Capo Press. ISBN 0-306-80498-0.
- Curry, Andrew (2012). "The Weapon That Changed History". Archaeology. 65 (1): 32–37. JSTOR 41780760.
- Daly, Gregory (2002). Cannae: The Experience of Battle in the Second Punic War. London: Routledge. ISBN 978-0-415-26147-0.
- Delbruck, Hans (1975). Warfare in Antiquity Volume 1. University of Nebraska Press. ISBN 0-8032-9199-X.
- Dodge, Theodore Ayrault (1981). Hannibal. Da Capo Press. ISBN 0-306-81362-9.
- Gabriel, Richard A. (2008). Scipio Africanus: Rome's Greatest General. Potomac Books, Inc. ISBN 978-1-59797-998-6.
- Gabriel, Richard A. (2011). Hannibal: The Military Biography of Rome's Greatest Enemy. Potomac Books, Inc. ISBN 978-1-59797-686-2.
- Erdkamp, Paul (2015) [2011]. "Manpower and Food Supply in the First and Second Punic Wars". In Hoyos, Dexter (ed.). A Companion to the Punic Wars. Chichester, West Sussex: John Wiley. pp. 58–76. ISBN 978-1-1190-2550-4.
- Fronda, Michael P. (2011). "Hannibal: Tactics, Strategy, and Geostrategy". In Hoyos, Dexter (ed.). A Companion to the Punic Wars. Oxford: Wiley-Blackwell. pp. 242–259. ISBN 978-1-405-17600-2.
- Goldsworthy, Adrian Keith (2001). The Punic Wars. Cassell. ISBN 978-0-304-35967-7.
- Goldsworthy, Adrian (2003). The Fall of Carthage. Cassel Military Paperbacks. ISBN 0-304-36642-0.
- Goldsworthy, Adrian (2006). The Fall of Carthage: The Punic Wars 265–146 BC. London: Phoenix. ISBN 978-0-304-36642-2.
- Hau, Lisa (2016). Moral History from Herodotus to Diodorus Siculus. Edinburgh: Edinburgh University Press. ISBN 978-1-4744-1107-3.
- Hoyos, Dexter (2003). Hannibal's Dynasty: Power and Politics in the Western Mediterranean, 247-183 BC. Routledge. ISBN 978-1-134-42465-8.
- Hoyos, Dexter (2005). Hannibal's Dynasty :Power and Politics in the Western Mediterranean, 247-183 BC. New York: Routledge. ISBN 978-0-415-35958-0.
- Hoyos, Dexter (2015) [2011]. A Companion to the Punic Wars. Chichester, West Sussex: John Wiley. ISBN 978-1-1190-2550-4.
- Hoyos, Dexter (2015). Mastering the West: Rome and Carthage at War. Oxford: Oxford University Press. ISBN 978-0-19-986010-4.
- Lancel, Serge (1999). Hannibal. Translated by Nevill, Antonia. Wiley. ISBN 9780631218487.
- Lazenby, John Francis (1978). Hannibal's War: A Military History of the Second Punic War. Aris and Phillips. ISBN 978-0-85668-080-9.
- Lazenby, John (1996). The First Punic War: A Military History. Stanford, California: Stanford University Press. ISBN 978-0-8047-2673-3.
- Lazenby, John (1998). Hannibal's War: A Military History of the Second Punic War. Warminster: Aris & Phillips. ISBN 978-0-85668-080-9.
- MacDougall, Patrick Leonard (2007). The Campaigns of Hannibal. Westholme Publishing. ISBN 978-1-59416-056-1.
- Miles, Richard (2011). Carthage Must be Destroyed. London: Penguin. ISBN 978-0-14-101809-6.
- Peddie, John (2005). Hannibal's War. Sutton Publishing Limited. ISBN 0-7509-3797-1.
- Prevas, John (1998). Hannibal Crosses The Alps. Da Capo Press. ISBN 0-306-81070-0.
- Rawlings, Louis (1996). "Celts, Spaniards, and Samnites: Warriors in a Soldiers' War". Bulletin of the Institute of Classical Studies. Supplement (67): 81–95. JSTOR 43767904.
- Sabin, Philip (1996). "The Mechanics of Battle in the Second Punic War". Bulletin of the Institute of Classical Studies. Supplement. 67 (67): 59–79. JSTOR 43767903.
- Scullard, Howard H. (2006) [1989]. "Carthage and Rome". In Walbank, F. W.; Astin, A. E.; Frederiksen, M. W. & Ogilvie, R. M. (eds.). Cambridge Ancient History: Volume 7, Part 2, 2nd Edition. Cambridge: Cambridge University Press. pp. 486–569. ISBN 978-0-521-23446-7.
- Walbank, F.W. (1990). Polybius. Vol. 1. Berkeley: University of California Press. ISBN 978-0-520-06981-7.
- Zimmermann, Klaus (2015) [2011]. "Roman Strategy and Aims in the Second Punic War". In Hoyos, Dexter (ed.). A Companion to the Punic Wars. Oxford: Wiley-Blackwell. pp. 280–298. ISBN 978-1-405-17600-2.
