= Battle of Beneventum =

The Battle of Beneventum may refer to one of two battles:

- The Battle of Beneventum (275 BC), an inconclusive battle fought between Pyrrhus of Epirus and Manius Curius Dentatus during the Pyrrhic War.
- The Battle of Beneventum (214 BC), a battle fought between Hanno and Tiberius Gracchus during the Second Punic War and a Roman victory.
- The Battle of Beneventum (212 BC)

== See also ==
- Battle of Benevento (AD 1266)
