= Piraino (surname) =

Piraino is an Italian surname. Notable people with the surname include:

- Antonio Piraíno (1928–2020), Chilean equestrian
- Francisco Piraíno, Chilean politician
- Gabriele Piraino (born 2003), Italian tennis player
- Maria Teresa Manni Piraino, Italian classical scholar and epigrapher
- Valerie Piraino (born 1981), Rwandan and American contemporary visual artist
