= Heat-Ray (disambiguation) =

The Heat-Ray is a fictional weapon used by the Martians in the novel The War of the Worlds.

Heat-Ray may also refer to:

- Active Denial System, also known as the "heat ray", a non-lethal directed-energy weapon
- Archimedes' heat ray – Device purported to be used by Archimedes to burn Roman ships
- Godzilla's atomic heat beam
- A fictional weapon in the novel Danny Dunn and the Heat Ray

== See also ==
- Thermal radiation, electromagnetic radiation emitted by the thermal motion of particles in matter
