= Thomas Spence (disambiguation) =

Thomas Spence (1750–1814) was an English Radical. Other notable people with the same name include:

- Thomas Ara Spence (1810–1877), American politician
- Thomas Wilson Spence (1846–1912), Irish-American lawyer and politician
- Thomas Ralph Spence (c. 1855–1918), English painter, sculptor and architect
