= Claw of Archimedes =

Greek anti-ship weapon used in 213–212 BC

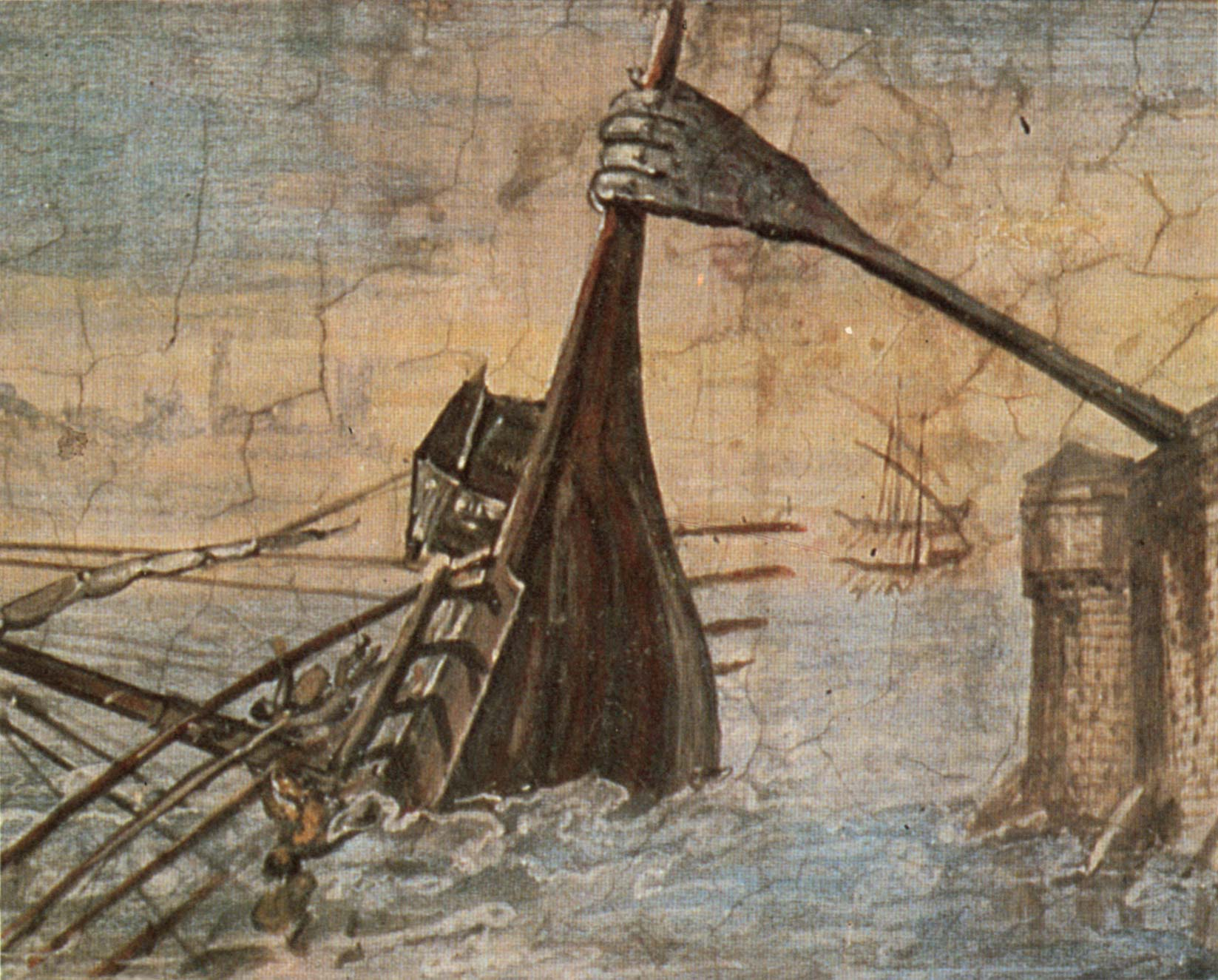
A painting of the Claw of Archimedes by Giulio Parigi, taking the name "iron hand" literally, 1599-1600

The Claw of Archimedes (Ancient Greek: Ἁρπάγη, romanized: harpágē, lit. 'snatcher'; also known as the iron hand) was an ancient weapon devised by Archimedes to defend the seaward portion of Syracuse's city wall against amphibious assault. Although its exact nature is unclear, the accounts of ancient historians seem to describe it as a sort of crane equipped with a grappling hook that was able to lift an attacking quinquereme by the bow. By then releasing the claw the ship would fall onto the rocks or water below, inevitably capsizing. The claw could allegedly shake boats with such force that the crew would be thrown into the sea.

These machines featured prominently during the Second Punic War in 214 BC, when the Roman Republic attacked Syracuse with a fleet of 60 quinqueremes under Marcus Claudius Marcellus. When the Roman fleet approached the city walls under cover of darkness, the machines were deployed, sinking many ships and throwing the attack into confusion. Historians such as Livy attributed heavy Roman losses to these machines, together with catapults also devised by Archimedes.

The plausibility of this invention was tested in 1999 in the BBC series Secrets of the Ancients and again in early 2005 in the Discovery Channel series Superweapons of the Ancient World. The producers of Superweapons brought together a group of engineers tasked with conceiving and implementing a design that was realistic, given what is known about Archimedes. Within seven days they were able to test their creation, and they did succeed in tipping over a model of a Roman ship so that it would sink. While this does not prove the existence of the Claw, it suggests that it would have been possible.

== See also ==
- Category:Ancient weapons
- Archimedes' heat ray – Device purported to be used by Archimedes to burn Roman ships
- Roman siege engines – Adapted from Hellenistic siege technology
- Sambuca (siege engine) – Ship-borne siege engine
- Greek fire
