= Herbessos =

Ancient city in Sicily

Coordinates: 37.42735°N 14.30098°E

Herbessos was an ancient city located at Montagna di Marzo, Sicily, a few kilometres north-west of Piazza Armerina.

It occupied an area of approximately 15 hectares and has been partially excavated.

The first limited excavations were by Paolo Orsi in 1930 who described the riches that were illegally stolen over the years, feeding large collections. Subsequently in the 1950s Dinu Adamesteanu recognised, through aerial photography, part of the ancient access routes to the city. In the 60s archaeology was carried out by Gino Vinicio Gentili and subsequently by Vito Romano who also identified a sacred area.

== History ==
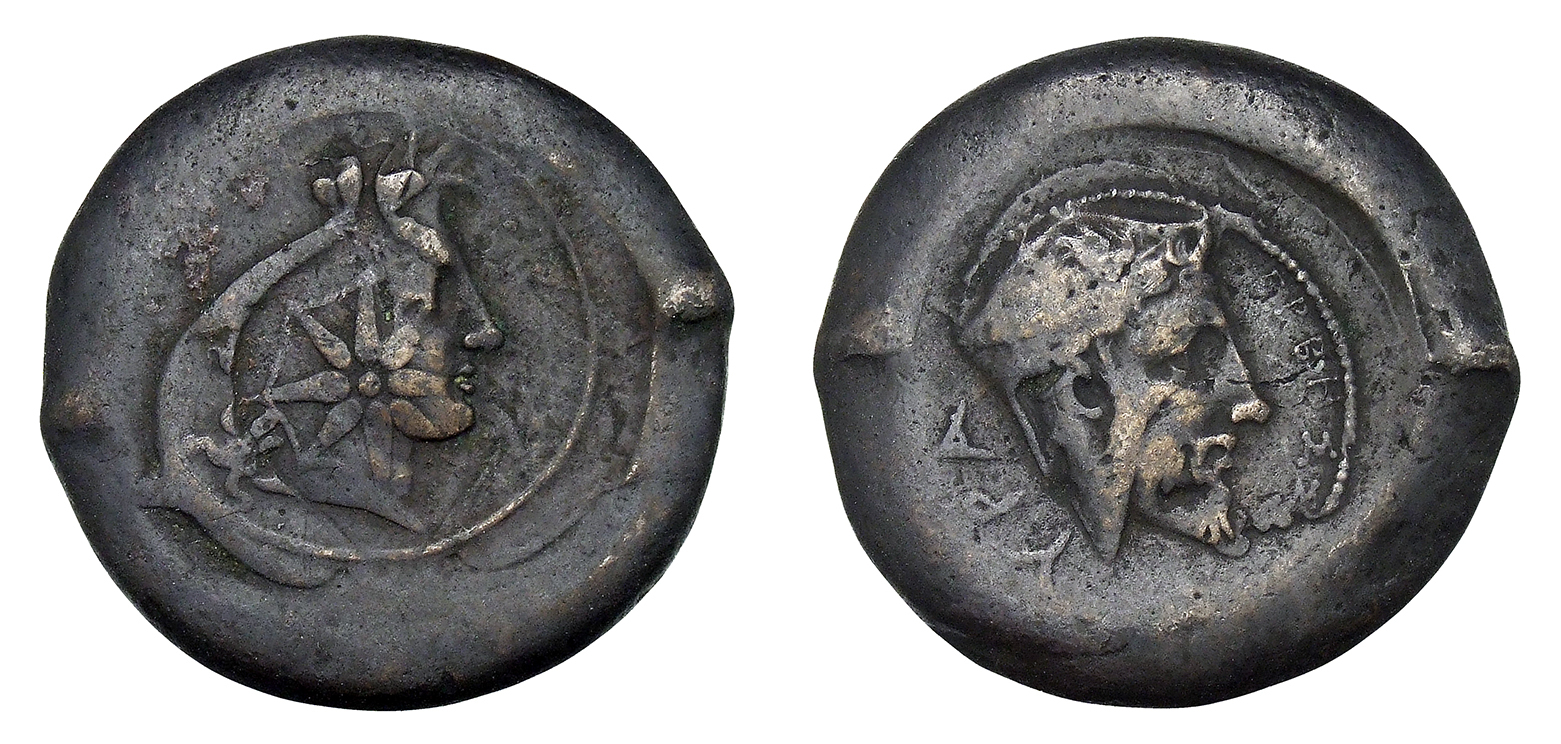
Bronze coin from Herbessos 357-335 BC (Berlin, Münzkabinett)

The most ancient traces are attributable to the ancient and middle bronze age, connected to the Castelluccio culture.

Herbessos is mentioned for the first time as a Siculan city allied to the Carthaginians during the Siege of Syracuse (415–413 BC). For this reason in 404 BC the city was attacked in vain by the tyrant Dionysius I of Syracuse, after which he made a treaty with it. Agathocles of Syracuse established a garrison there, which, in 309 BC, was driven out by the Acragantines while the tyrant was in Africa and the city became an ally of Akragas. It was later an ally of Syracuse.

In 262 BC, in the First Punic War, Herbessos was chosen by the Romans as the supply base but soon after it was captured by the Carthaginians. In 260 BC the Romans recaptured it.

In 214 BC Hippocrates of Syracuse, fleeing from Lentini, found refuge there. The Syracusan force sent against them was persuaded to desert. The city allied itself with Carthage shortly after which it was conquered by the Romans of Marcellus.

After the Second Punic War, the Romans razed the entire town to the ground, when nearby Morgantina was destroyed and Enna punished with the massacre of its citizens. They eventually rebuilt a Roman city, with the theatre, forum, other public buildings, and Roman houses.

Under the Romans it was one of the civitates latinae condicioni.

The settlement continued until the Middle Ages.

== The site ==
Two tombs of Sicilian warriors with armour were found and a set of 200 tomb vases, currently preserved in the museums of Agrigento and Caltanissetta. On 15 black-painted vases are inscriptions in the Sicilian language that refer to invasions of the ancient populations of Sicily, and uniquely the name of the King Italo or Sicelio the origin of the name of Sicily in 1100 BC.

The city was larger than Morgantina and was known as an archaeological area since the end of the 19th century when finds were circulating for collectors from all over the world. Its riches fueled the clandestine market for the whole of the last century, and bronze and marble sarcophagi, armour of ancient heroes, and precious ceramics emerged and then disappeared.

Archaeology has identified a Hippodamian orthogonal urban layout with two main roads and surrounded by city walls. In the south-west area, outside the walls and below the plateau, an important sanctuary area dedicated to the Chthonic divinity was investigated attributable to the cult of Demeter.

There are remains of a theatre built after the destruction of the Hellenic town. Around the altar of the theatre was found landfill including pieces of statues, architectural decorations in terra cotta, theatrical masks, and other pieces of plaster with inscriptions in Greek and Latin that told stories, with drawings including of a beautiful boat.

The fortified city is surrounded by several necropoli:

- east necropolis
- west necropolis
- Cammarata necropolis
- Ramursura necropolis

== Bibliography ==
- Giuseppe Briganti, Erbesso Pantalica Sortino, Graphic arts Città di Castello (from the University of California), 1969.
- Eugenio Manni, Physical and political geography of ancient Sicily, reprint, Rome, Giorgio Bretschneider publisher, 2004 [1981], ISBN 8885007554 .
- Vincenzo Librici Alfio, Raffadali, geo-socioeconomic aspects, Pezzini, 1986.
- Gaetano Di Giovanni, Historical information on Casteltermini and its territory, Volume 1, Girgenti, Salvatore Montes' provincial-commercial printing house, 1869.
