= Sambuca (siege engine) =

Ship-borne siege engine

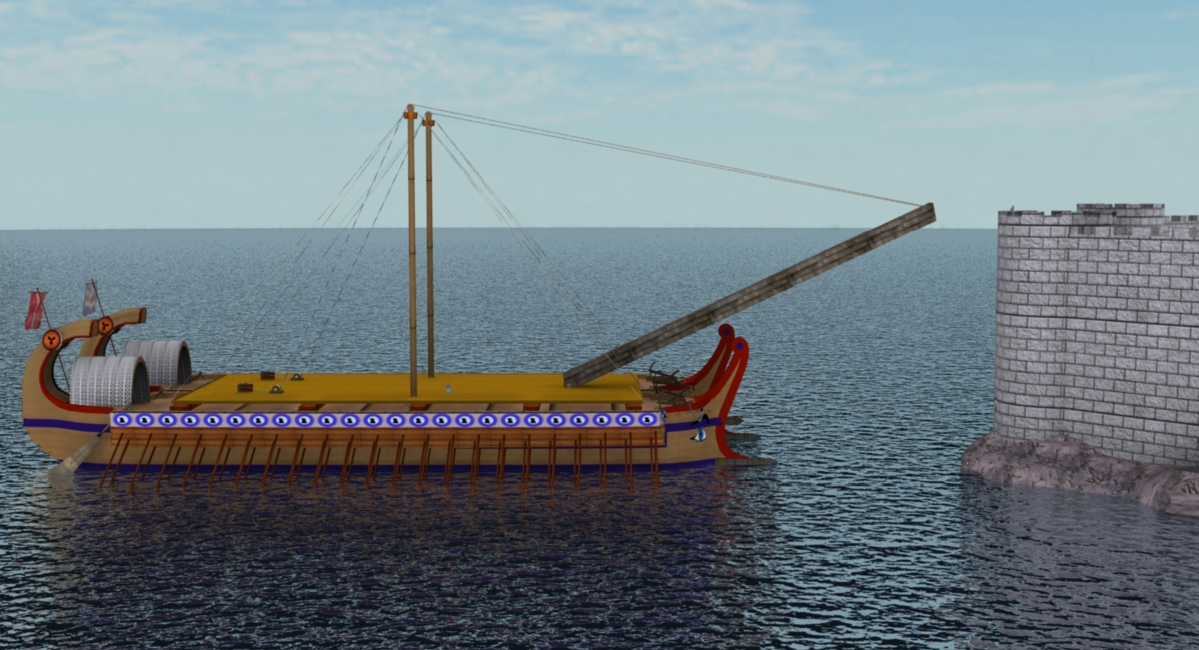
Reconstruction of a Greek sambuca

The sambuca (Ancient Greek: σαμβύκη) was a ship-borne siege engine which was invented by Heracleides of Tarentum and was first used unsuccessfully by Marcus Claudius Marcellus during the Roman siege of Syracuse in 213 BC.

Polybius describes usage of the machine:

As well as these vessels he had eight quinqueremes in pairs. Each pair had had their oars removed, one on the port and the other on the starboard side, and then these had been lashed together on the sides thus left bare. On these double vessels, rowed by the outer oars of each of the pair, they brought up under the walls some engines called "Sambucae", the construction of which was as follows: A ladder was made four feet broad, and of a height to reach the top of the wall from the place where its foot had to rest; each side of the ladder was protected by a railing, and a covering or pent-house was added overhead. It was then placed so that its foot rested across the sides of the lashed-together vessels, which touched each other with its other extremity protruding a considerable way beyond the prows. On the tops of the masts pulleys were fixed with ropes: and when the engines were about to be used, men standing on the sterns of the vessels drew the ropes tied to the head of the ladder, while others standing on the prows assisted the raising of the machine and kept it steady with long poles. Having then brought the ships close in shore by using the outer oars of both vessels they tried to let the machine down upon the wall. At the head of the ladder was fixed a wooden stage secured on three sides by wicker-shields, upon which stood four men who fought and struggled with those who tried to prevent the sambuca from being made to rest on the battlements. But when they have fixed it and so got above the level of the top of the wall, the four men unfasten the wicker shields from either side of the stage, and walk out upon the battlements or towers as the case may be; they are followed by their comrades coming up by the sambuca, since the ladder’s foot is safely secured with ropes and stands upon both the ships. This construction has got the name "sambuca" or "harp" for the natural reason, that when it is raised the combination of the ship and ladder has very much the appearance of such an instrument.

They were used again unsuccessfully during the siege of Chios. This may have been the siege conducted by Philip V of Macedon in 201 BC, but neither source specified the date.

A different design of machine, also called a sambuca, was used unsuccessfully by Mithridates VI of Pontus in his attack on Rhodes in 88 B.C.

The engine was built upon two ships lashed together and consisted of towers between which an assault bridge was hoisted. Mithridates' sambuca had rams and projectiles as part of its offensive battery. During its deployment but before it could be successfully employed to transport soldiers, it fell. With it, fell the fortunes of the eastern wave against Rhodes, the Pontic king withdrawing. Fifteen years later, Mithridates again used a siege engine, in his unsuccessful attack on Cyzicus. Later classical sources confuse the sambuca for a ship-mounted siege tower. Vegetius used the term sambuca as the name given to the assault ramp mounted on a siege tower.

The name sambuca, is derived from the musical instrument sambuca which it was said to resemble.

== See also ==
- Category:Ancient weapons
- Archimedes' heat ray – Device purported to be used by Archimedes to burn Roman ships
- Claw of Archimedes – Greek anti-ship weapon used in 213–212 BC
- Roman engineering – Engineering accomplishments of the ancient Roman civilization
- Roman siege engines – Adapted from Hellenistic siege technology
