= Battle of Beneventum (212 BC) =

Battle of the Second Punic War in Italy

- Part of the Second Punic War
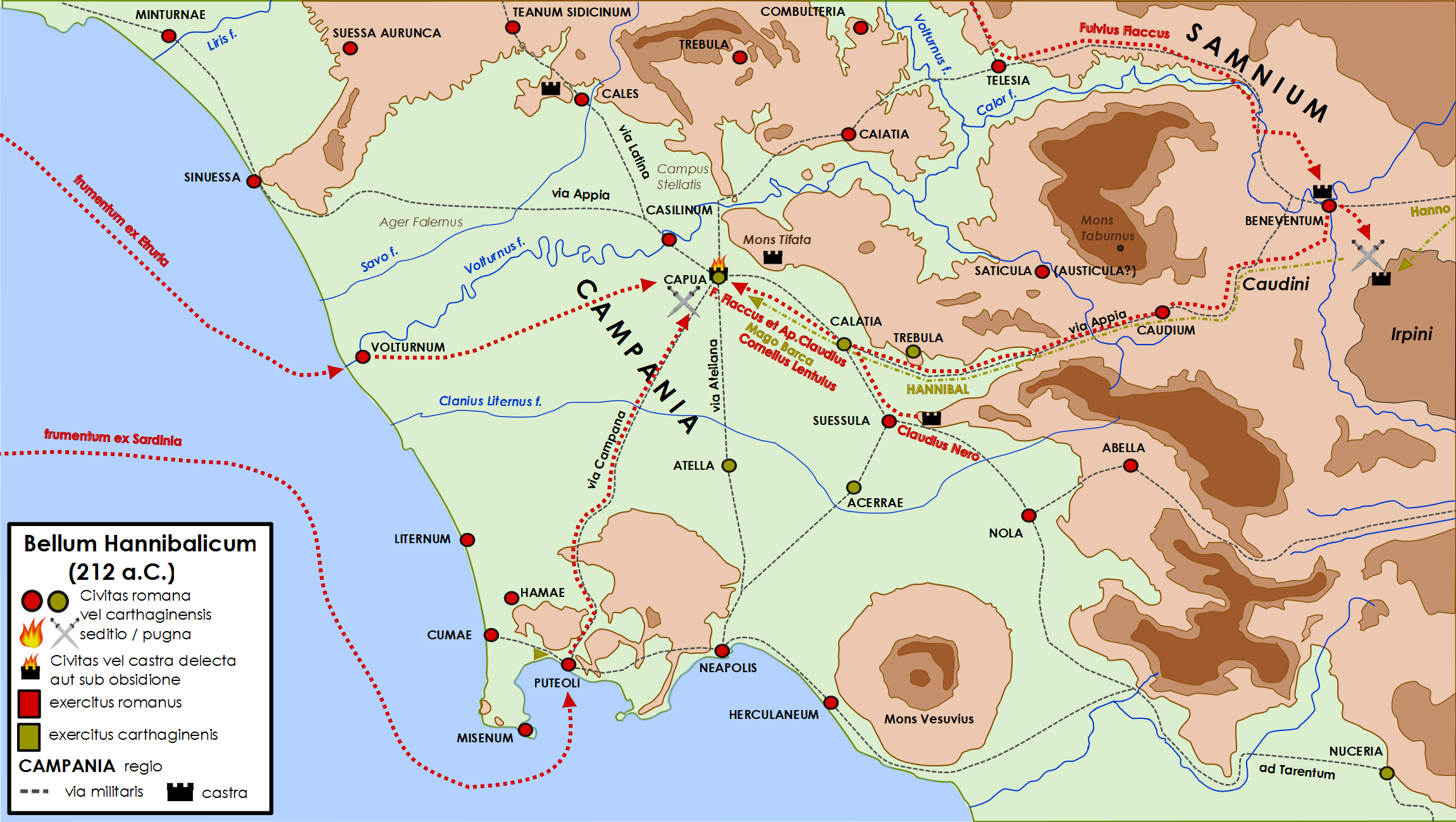
- Operations in Campania during the 212 BC campaign
Date	May 212 BC
Location	Beneventum; modern Benevento 41.1333°N 14.7833°E
Result	Roman victory

Belligerents
Roman Republic	Carthage

Commanders and leaders
Quintus Fulvius Flaccus	Hanno

Strength
18,400	13,000+

Casualties and losses
Unknown	6,000 killed 7,000 captured

The Battle of Beneventum was fought between Carthage and the Roman Republic in 212 BC during the Second Punic War. During this conflict, Hanno, son of Bomilcar was defeated by Quintus Fulvius Flaccus. Livy gives a short account of this battle at 25.13-14.
