= Adranodoros =

3rd-century BC tyrant of Syracuse

Adranodoros (or Andranodorus) was the son-in-law of the Greek Sicilian king Hiero II of Syracuse in the 3rd century BC. His wife was Hiero's daughter, Demarata. He was one of the fifteen guardians named by Hiero to counsel Hiero's fifteen-year-old grandson and successor, Hieronymus of Syracuse, after Hiero died. Adranodoros dismissed the other guardians, saying that they were not needed, and became Hieronymos's chief counsellor. He encouraged Hieronymus to change the allegiance of Syracuse from Rome to Carthage, and connect himself with Hannibal.

Hieronymus was tyrannical, and was killed by a band of conspirators after ruling for a turbulent 13 months. Andranodoros attempted to occupy Sicily with the intention of usurping the royal power. He quickly surrendered to the Syracusans, and was elected one of their generals, along with Themistus, Hieronymus' brother-in-law. Before long, the people of Syracuse became suspicious of him. A comedian and friend of Andranodoros's, named Ariston, reported to the other generals that the Andranodoros and Themistus were still plotting to seize power for themselves, and massacre the other leaders of the city. The magistrates of the island ordered that Andranodoros be killed. As he entered the senate building, Andranodoros was assassinated, along with members of the old royal family.

The people of Syracuse rose up and demanded justice for Andranodoros's assassination. One of his killers, a soldier named Sopater, defended himself by claiming that Hieronymus' tyrannical actions were orchestrated by Andranodoros. He also claimed that Andranodoros and Themistus's conspiracy was orchestrated by their power-hungry wives, Hiero's daughter and granddaughter. The wives were then killed to appease the people's fury.

== Other sources ==
- http://www.math.nyu.edu/~crorres/Archimedes/Family/FamilyIntro.html
- https://www.cs.drexel.edu/~crorres/Archimedes/Family/Hieronymos_OLD.html

Preceded by: Hieronymus	Tyrant of Syracuse; 214 BCE	Succeeded by: Hippocrates and Epicydes
