= Bomilcar =

Bomilcar (Punic: 𐤁𐤃𐤌𐤋𐤒𐤓𐤕, bdmlqrt, "Servant of Melqart" or "In Melqart's Hand") may refer to:

- Bomilcar (4th century BC), Carthaginian commander in the war against Agathocles
- Bomilcar (suffete) (3rd century BC), Carthaginian suffete and commander in the Second Punic War, father of Hanno
- Bomilcar (3rd century BC), Carthaginian commander in the Second Punic War, supply officer of Hannibal
- Bomilcar (2nd century BC), Numidian nobleman and follower of Jugurtha
