= Maria Teresa Manni Piraino =

Italian classical scholar and epigrapher

Maria Teresa Manni Piraino (also known as Maria Teresa Piraino Manni) was an Italian classical scholar and epigrapher. She worked extensively on the Greek inscriptions of ancient Sicily, with a particular interest in the archaic period. Her methodology was characterized by a careful attention towards integrating the archeological context and material features of each inscription with its linguistic ones.

In 1973, she published the Iscrizioni greche lapidarie di Museo di Palermo, the leading catalogue for Greek inscriptions in Western Sicily, noted for its Selinuntine material and "virtually complete illustration".

Lazzarini attributes to her work a persistent interest in indigenous Sicilian epigraphy at the University of Palermo.

She was active between 1952 and 1987, and was married to Eugenio Manni.

== Selected publications ==
- Antigono Dosone re di Macedonia. Presso l'Accademia, 1954.
- "Iscrizione inedita da Poggioreale", Kokalos 5, 1959.
- "Le iscrizioni". Himera I. Campagne di scavo 1963–65. G. Bretschneider, 1970.
- Iscrizioni greche lapidarie del Museo di Palermo. S. F. Flaccovio, 1973.
- "Contribution épigraphique à l'étude de l'esclavage en Sicile". Actes du Groupe de Recherches sur l’Esclavage depuis l’Antiquité, 1976.
- "L’apporto dell’epigrafia", Kokalos 30–31, 1984–1985.
- Camarina-Rifriscolaro: graffiti su anfore. G. Bretschneider, 1987.
