= Bomilcar (suffete) =

Carthaginian commander in the Second Punic War

Bomilcar (Punic: 𐤁𐤃𐤌𐤋𐤒𐤓𐤕, bdmlqrt) was a Carthaginian nobleman and commander in the Second Punic War (218–201 BC).

He was a son-in-law of Hamilcar Barca and the father of the Hanno who commanded a portion of Hannibal's army at the passage of the Rhone (218 BC) and at the Battle of Cannae. This Bomilcar seems to have been one of the Carthaginian suffetes and to have presided in that assembly of the senate in which the Second Punic War was resolved upon.

== See also ==
- Other Bomilcars in Carthaginian history
- Melqart, the Canaanite deity
