= Himilco (fl. 3rd century BC) =

Carthaginian general

Himilco was a Carthaginian general during the Second Punic War. He invaded Sicily in 214 BC, after the pro-Carthaginian tyrants Hippocrates and Epicydes came to power in Syracuse. With their assistance, and with (according to Livy) a large Carthaginian army of 20,000 infantry and 3,000 cavalry, he overran large portions of Sicily, including the old Carthaginian stronghold of Agrigentum, and harried the Roman forces under Marcus Claudius Marcellus that were besieging Syracuse.

He met with considerable local support, notably due to the Roman massacre of the pro-Carthaginian population of Enna. However, an outbreak of plague in 212 BC destroyed most of his army, with himself among the fatalities.

The Romans retook Agrigentum in 210 BC.
