= Hieronymus of Syracuse =

Ancient Roman politician

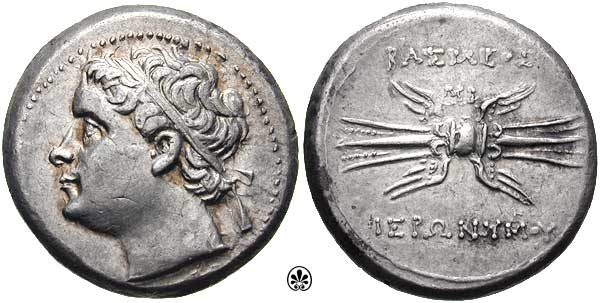
Coin depicting Hieronymus of Syracuse, c. 215-14 BC

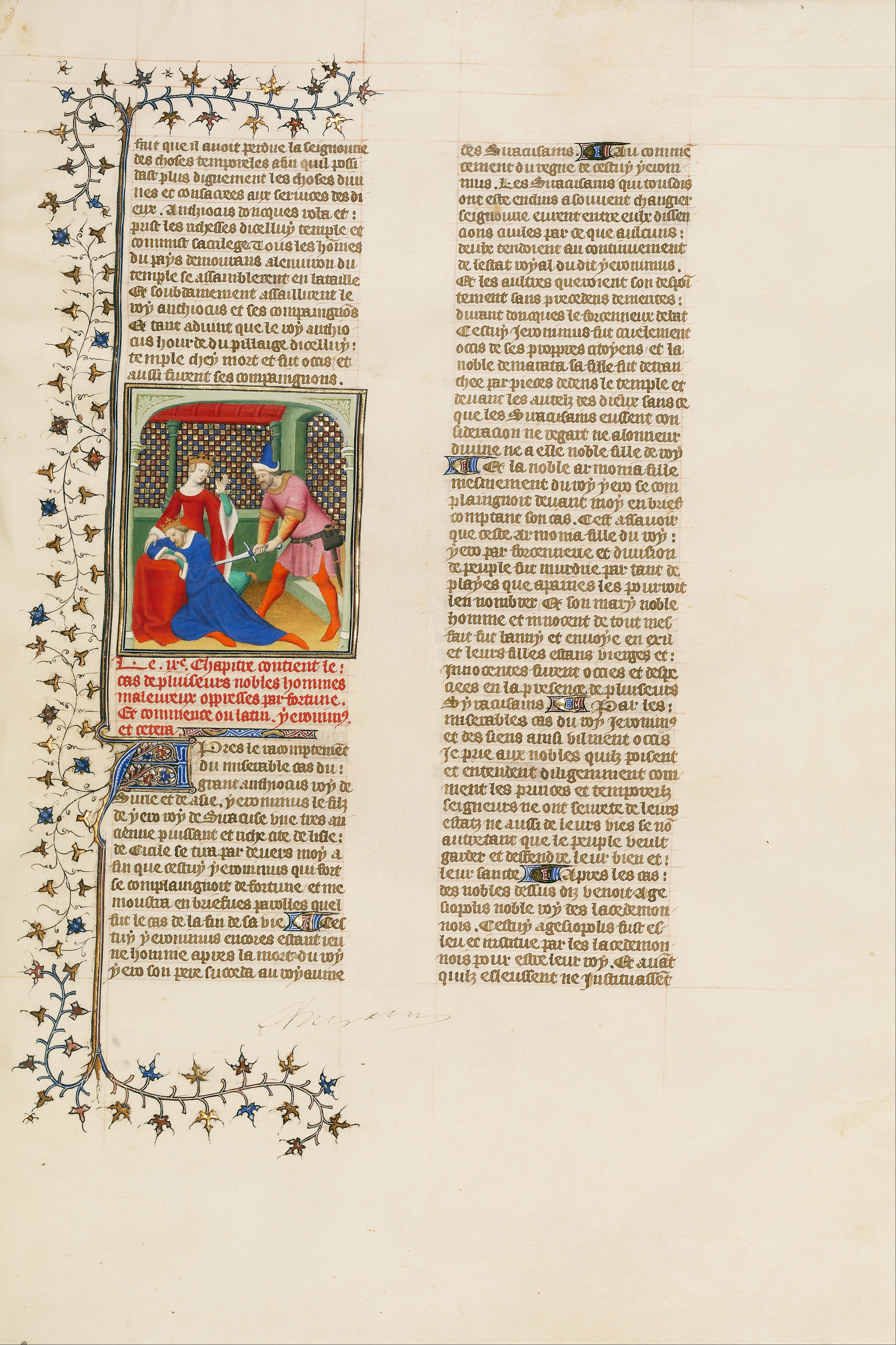
The Assassination of Hieronymus, King of Syracuse

Hieronymus (Greek: Ἱερώνυμος; Sicilian: Girunimu; 231–214 BC) was a tyrant of Syracuse, Sicily. He succeeded his grandfather, Hiero II, in 215 BC. He was at this time only fifteen years old, and he ascended the throne at a crisis full of peril, as the Battle of Cannae had given a shock to the power of the Roman Republic, the influence of which had been felt in Sicily. Though this had not shaken the fidelity of the aged Hiero, a large faction in Syracuse was already disposed to abandon the alliance with Rome in favor of one with Carthage. The young prince had already given indications of weakness, if not depravity of disposition, which had alarmed his grandfather, and caused him to confide the guardianship of Hieronymus to a council of fifteen persons, among whom were his two sons-in-law, Andranodorus and Zoippus. But the objects of this arrangement were quickly frustrated by the ambition of Andranodorus, who, in order to get rid of the interference of his colleagues, persuaded the young king to assume the reins of government, and himself set the example of resigning his office, which was followed by the other guardians. Hieronymus now became a mere tool in the hands of his two uncles, both of whom were favourable to the Carthaginian alliance. Thrason, the only one of his counsellors who retained any influence over his mind, and who was a staunch friend of the Romans, was soon got rid of by a charge of conspiracy.

The young king now sent ambassadors to Hannibal, and the envoys of that general, Hippocrates and Epicydes, were welcomed at Syracuse with the highest honours. On the other hand, the deputies sent by Appius Claudius, the Roman praetor in Sicily, were treated with the utmost contempt and it was evident that Hieronymus was preparing for immediate hostilities. He sent ambassadors to Carthage, to conclude a treaty with that power, by the terms of which the river Himera was to be the boundary between the Carthaginians and Syracusans in Sicily, but he quickly raised his demands, and, by a second embassy, laid claim to the whole island for himself. The Carthaginians readily promised everything, in order to secure his alliance for the moment, and he assembled an army of fifteen thousand men, with which he was preparing to take the field, having previously dispatched Hippocrates and Epicydes to sound the disposition of the cities subject to Rome, when his schemes were suddenly brought to a close. A band of conspirators, at the head of whom was Deinomenes, fell upon him in the streets of Leontini, and dispatched him with numerous wounds, before his guards could come to his rescue, 214 BC.

The short reign of Hieronymus had lasted only 13 months, and ancient, pro-Roman writers said his rule had presented the most striking contrast to that of his grandfather. Those writers, perhaps seeking to ingratiate themselves with the Roman victors, accused the young monarch of allowing himself to be seduced by the corrupting influences at court, and reputed to him a naturally bad disposition, at once weak and violent, and possessing the temperament of a childish tyrant. They wrote that from the moment of his accession he gave himself up to the influence of flatterers, who urged him to the vilest excesses: he assumed at once all the external pomp of royalty which Hiero had so studiously avoided; and while he plunged in the most shameless manner into every species of luxury and debauchery, he displayed the most unrelenting cruelty towards all those who became objects of his suspicion.

However, Polybius appears inclined to doubt the inflammatory statements on this subject; and it is not improbable that they may have been exaggerated by the writers to whom he refers. Among the many libels and slanders heaped upon Hieronymus were comparisons to the Severan Roman Emperor Elagabalus, to whose character Hieronymus' was latterly compared. Among the instances cited for his contempt of public decency, he was said to have married a prostitute, Peitho, on whom he bestowed the title and honors of a queen.

Preceded by: Hiero II	Tyrant of Syracuse; 215 BC – 214 BC	Succeeded by: Adranodoros
