= Thomas Ralph Spence =

English artist (c. 1845–1918)

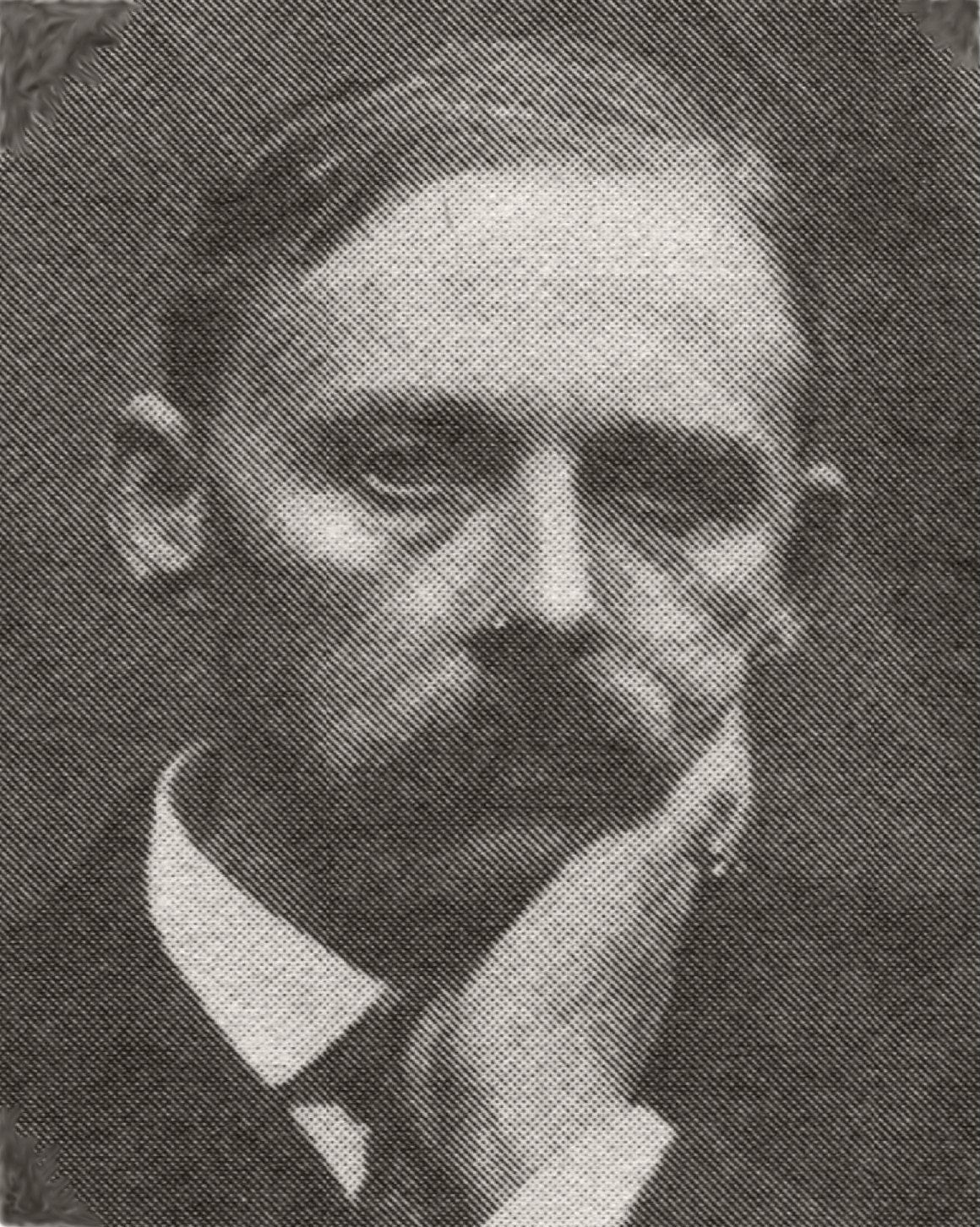
- Born: 1845; Gilling West, Richmond, North Yorkshire
- Died: 1918 (aged 72–73); Beckenham, Kent
- Occupations: Architect, painter and sculptor

Thomas Ralph Spence (1845–1918) was an English painter, sculptor and architect, based during his working life in Newcastle and London. (Note: Thomas Ralph Spence (1845–1918). GRO index: Births Jun 1845 Spence Male Richmond XXIV 486 (Note: GRO death age is 72. Newspaper birth place is Gilling West near Richmond. The parentage on this certificate now needs to be checked with the Census). Deaths Jun 1918 Spence Thomas R. 72 Bromley 2a 672)

== Gallery ==
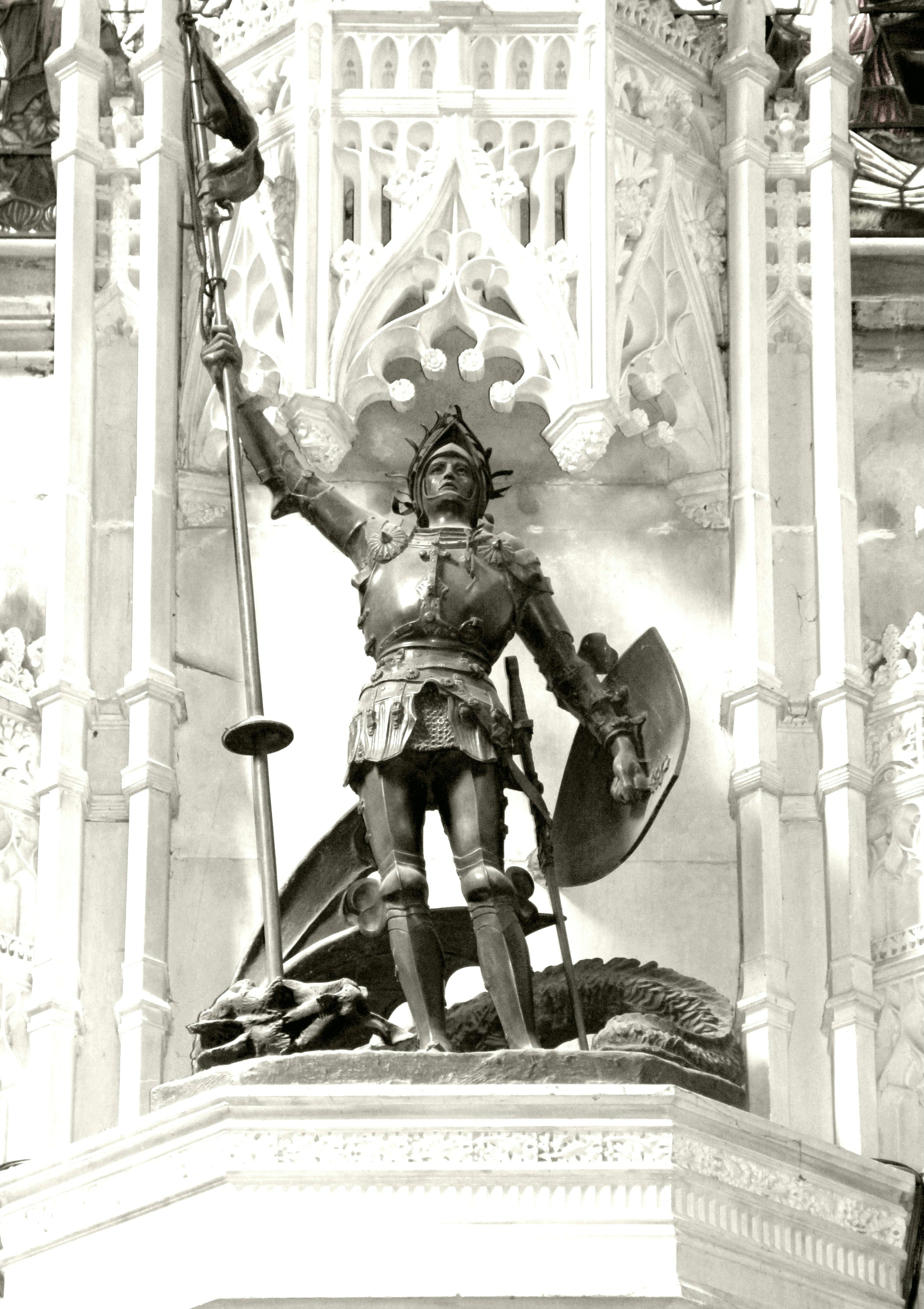
St. George and the Dragon, 1888 (after Spence's design)

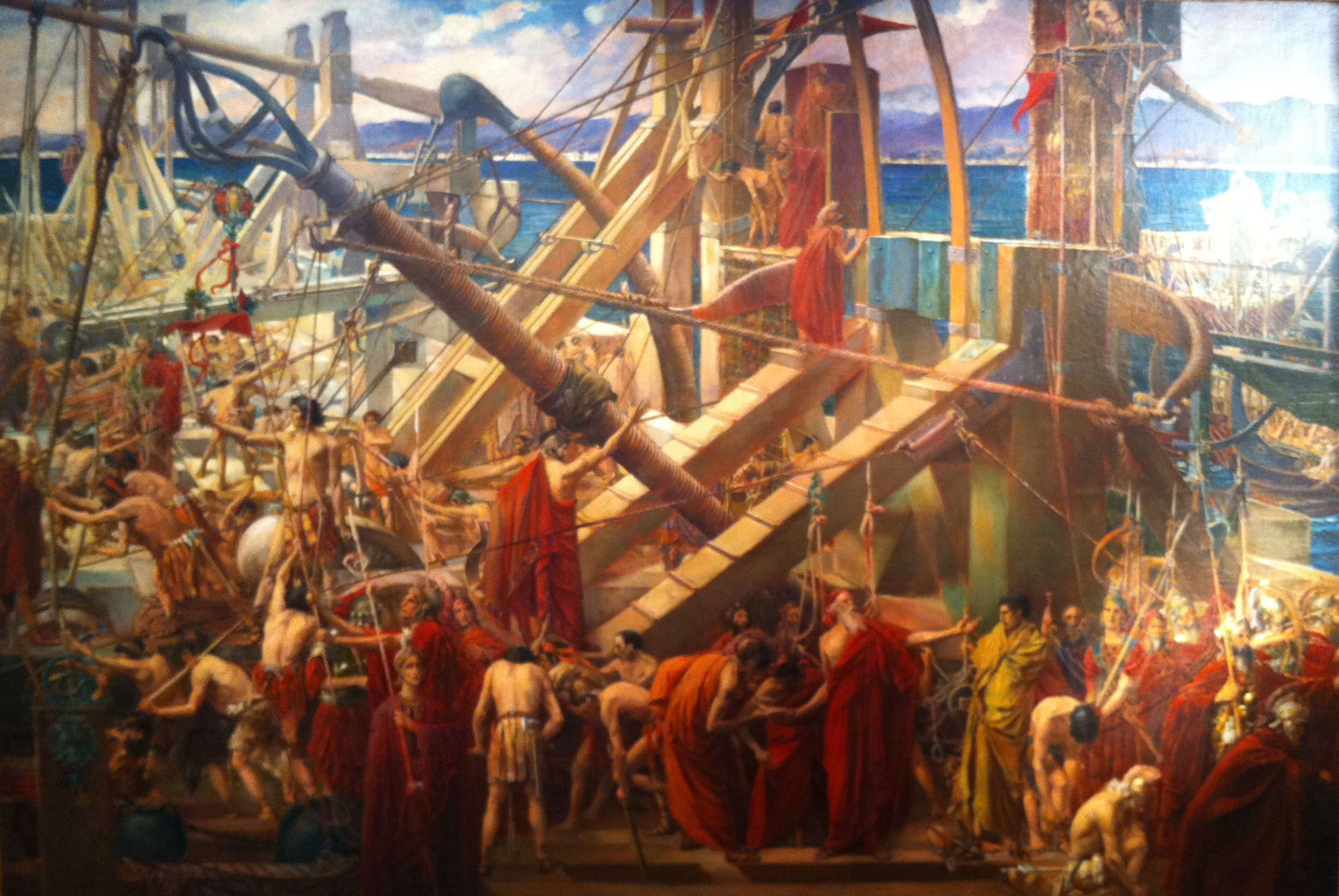
Archimedes Directing the Defences of Syracuse, 1895

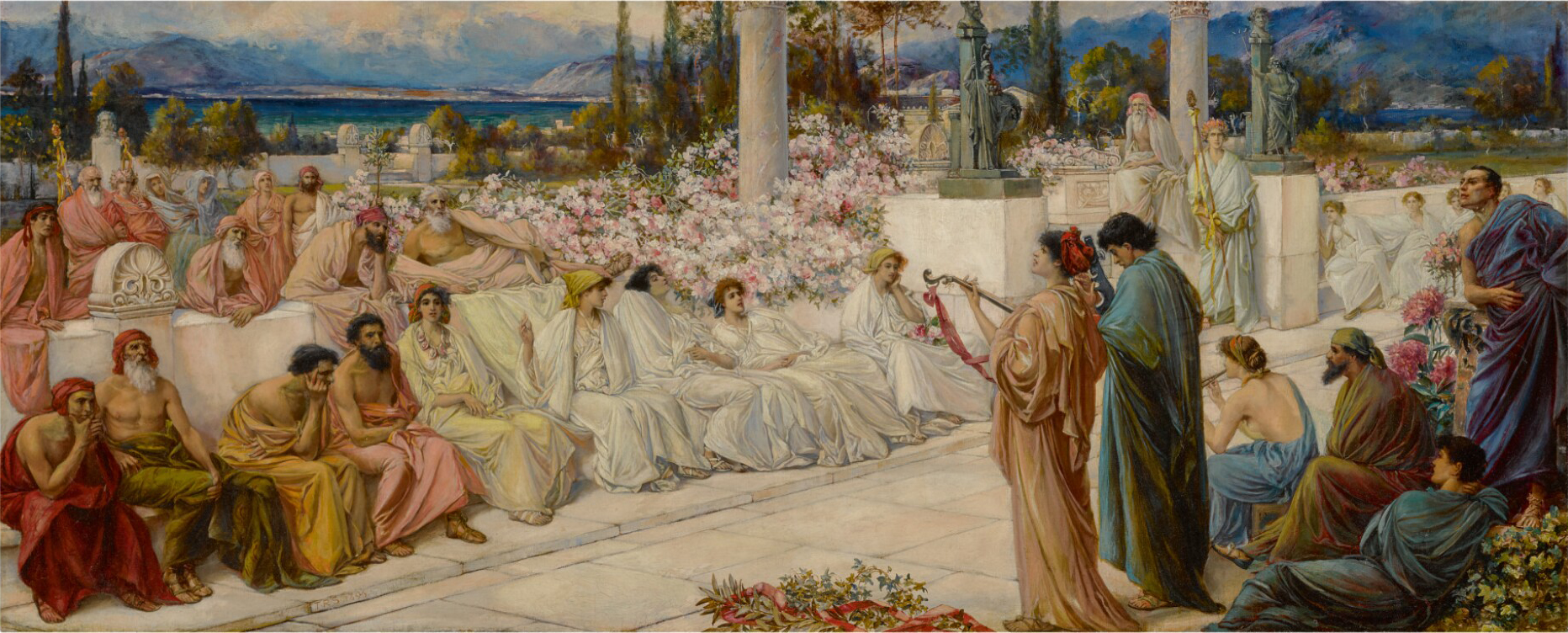
Disciples of Sappho, 1896
