= Eugenio Manni =

Eugenio Manni (1910 in Modena – 14 September 1989, in Fiumalbo) was an Italian ancient historian.

Having graduated from the University of Turin, he specialised at the end of the 1940s in ancient history, particularly ancient Greece, Rome and the history of Sicily in the period before the Greeks.

Initially, he was employed by a liceo (high school), but then, from 1950 until his retirement, he was a lecturer in ancient history at the University of Palermo. In Palermo, he founded the journal, ΚΩΚΑΛΟΣ. Studi pubblicati dall'Istituto di storia antica dell'Università di Palermo in 1955, the "Biago Pace" Sicilian Centre of Archaeological-Historical Studies in 1957, and the Sicilian Institute for Ancient History in 1968.

He was the author of numerous publications, the most important of which were Per la storia dei municipii fino alla guerra sociale (The History of the municipii until the Social War) in 1947 and Geografia fisica e politica della Sicilia antica (Physical and Political Geography of Ancient Sicily) in 1981.

He was married to Maria Teresa Manni Piraino.

== Selected bibliography ==
- Romulus e parens patriae nell'ideologia politica e religiosa romana (Romulus and parens patriae in the Roman Political and Religious Ideology) - Torino, Officina grafica elzeviriana (1934)
- Il Santo Miracolo di Cannobio. - Varallo Sesia, Capelli (1947)
- Per la storia dei municipii fino alla guerra sociale (The History of the municipii until the Social War) - Roma, Signorelli (1947)
- L'impero di Gallieno (The Empire of Gallienus) - Roma, Signorelli (1949)
- Demetrio Poliorcete (Demetrius Poliorcetes) - Roma, Signorelli (1951)
- La cupola del Sacro monte di Varallo Sesia: a ricordo dell'anno dell'Assunta 1950-1951 (The Dome of the Sacred Mountain of Varallo Sesia: Record of the Year of the Assumption 1950–1951) - Varallo Sesia, Capelli (1951)
- Le vite di Valeriano e di Gallieno (The Lives of Valerian and Gallienus) - Palermo, Palumbo (1951)
- Introduzione allo studio della storia greca e romana (Introduction to the Study of Greek and Roman History) - Palermo, Palumbo (1952)
- Plutarchi Vita Demetri Poliorcetis (Plutarch's Life of Demetrius Poliorcetes) - Firenze, La Nuova Italia (1953)
- Sicelo e l'origine dei Siculi (Sicelus and the Origins of the Sicels) - Palermo, Flaccovio (1957)
- Sicilia ellenica (Greek Sicily) - Vicenza, Edistampa (1962)
- Sicilia Pagana (Pagan Sicily) - Palermo, Flaccovio (1963) e Fondazione Famiglia Piccolo di Calanovella (2005)
- La Sicile à la veille de la colonisation grecque (Sicily on the Eve of Greek Colonisation) - Bordeaux, Féret et fils (1969; in francese)
- Lucio Sergio Catilina (Lucius Sergius Catiline) - Palermo, Palumbo (1969)
- I campanili della Valsesia: note di storia religiosa e artistica (The Bell-Towers of Valsesia: Notes on Religious and Artistic History) - Varallo Sesia, Capelli (1973)
- Roma e l'Italia nel Mediterraneo antico (Rome and Italy in the Ancient Mediterranean) - Milano, Società editrice internazionale (1973)
- Mediterraneo antico (Ancient Mediterranean) - Palermo, Manfredi (1974)
- "Indigeni" e colonizzatori nella Sicilia preromana ("Natives" and Colonialists in Preroman Sicily) - Bucarest, Academiei (1976)
- Geografia, fisica e politica della Sicilia antica (Physical and Political Geography of Ancient Sicily) - Roma, Bretschneider (1981)
- Scritti Minori di Storia Antica della Sicilia e dell'Italia meridionale (Minor Writings on the Ancient History of Sicily and southern Italy) - Roma, Bretschneider (1990; postumo)

== Bibliography ==
- AA.VV. - Miscellanea di studi classici in onore di Eugenio Manni vol. 1-2-3 - Roma, Bretschneider, 1980.
- AA.VV. - Sicilia archeologica - Roma, L'Erma di Bretschneider, 1989.
- AA.VV., Who's who in Italy - Milano, Intercontinental Book and Publishing, 1957.
- U. Bosco - Lessico universale italiano vol. 12 - Roma, Istituto della Enciclopedia italiana, 1968.
- G. Vaccaro - Panorama biografico degli italiani d'oggi vol. 2 - Roma, Curcio, 1956.
