= Bomilcar (3rd century BC) =

Carthaginian leader in the Second Punic War

Bomilcar (Punic: 𐤁𐤃𐤌𐤋𐤒𐤓𐤕, BDMLQRT) was a Carthaginian commander in the Second Punic War (218–201 BC).

He was the commander of the Carthaginian supplies which were voted to Hannibal after the Battle of Cannae (216 BC) and with which he arrived in Italy in the ensuing year. They amounted to 4,000 Numidian cavalry, 40 war elephants, 500 or 1,000 talents of silver, grain, and other provisions. In 214 BC, he was sent with 55 ships to the aid of Syracuse, then besieged by the Romans. Finding himself unable to cope with the superior fleet of the enemy, he withdrew to North Africa.

In 212 BC, he escaped the harbour at Syracuse and carried to Carthage the news of the perilous state of the city, all of which—except Achradina—was in the possession of Marcellus. He returned within a few days with 100 ships.

In the same year, following the destruction by pestilence of the Carthaginian land-forces under Hippocrates and Himilco, Bomilcar again sailed to Carthage with the news and returned with 130 ships, but was prevented by Marcellus from reaching Syracuse. He then proceeded to Tarentum, apparently with the view to cutting off the supplies of the Roman garrison in that town. As the presence of his force only increased the scarcity under which the Tarentines themselves suffered, they were obliged to dismiss him.

== See also ==
- Other Bomilcars in Carthaginian history
- Melqart, the Canaanite deity
