= Hanno, son of Bomilcar =

Carthaginian officer during the Second Punic War

Hanno (Punic: 𐤇𐤍𐤀, ḤNʾ), distinguished as the son of the suffet Bomilcar, was a Carthaginian officer in the Second Punic War (218 to 201 BC).

== Biography ==
He was a nephew of Hannibal Barca, Carthage's leading general. Hanno's mother was one of Hannibal's three elder sisters.

=== Travel through the Alps ===
When Hannibal's army reached the Western bank of the Rhône River, they began preparations to cross. A group of Gauls gathered on the Eastern bank, intent on preventing the army from crossing. Hanno led a small group north, which crossed in small rafts they built. Once across, they headed south toward the Gauls. Hanno sent a smoke signal to inform Hannibal that his force was ready. Hannibal began to send his cavalry across in canoes. As the cavalry attained a foothold on the Eastern bank, the Gauls approached, ready to fight. At this point, Hanno's force attacked the Gauls' rear, causing enough confusion to force the Gauls to retreat.

=== Campaign in Italy ===
At the Battle of Cannae, Hanno led the Numidian cavalry on the right (northern) side of the Carthaginian army. Hasdrubal led the Spanish and Celtic cavalry on the left (south near the Aufidus river) of the Carthaginian army. Hasdrubal was given about 6,500 cavalry, and Hanno had 3,500 Numidians. Hasdrubal's force was able to quickly destroy the Roman cavalry (on the south), pass the Romans' infantry rear, and reach the Roman allied cavalry while they were engaged with Hanno's Numidians. Once the Romans' allied cavalry was destroyed, Hanno and Hasdrubal were able to lead their cavalry into the Roman infantry's rear.

With the defection of several cities to Carthage in Lucania, Bruttium, Apulia and Samnium after Cannae, Hannibal sent Mago Barca into Lucania with a detachment of troops in 216 BC to recruit troops and subjugate towns. Mago completed his mission, and when he sailed to Carthage to report to the Carthaginian senate and ask for reinforcements, Hanno was left in command of his army. Hanno continued to subdue pro-Roman towns in Bruttium. While marching back to Campania Tiberius Sempronius Longus defeated Hanno near Grumentum, causing 2,000 casualties, and forcing Hanno to retreat back to Bruttium in early 215 BC. Hanno received the reinforcements landed by Bomilcar, the leading Carthaginian admiral, consisting of 4,000 cavalry and 40 elephants, near Locri and joined Hannibal near Nola later that year. He was present at the Third Battle of Nola in the summer of 215 BC. After the battle, Hannibal sent Hanno back to Bruttium with an army.

Hanno led a mostly Bruttian army that captured Crotona in 215 BC, and with the defection of Locri, all of Bruttium except Rhegium was allied with Carthage. He had marched to join Hannibal in Campania in early 214 BC, but, near the River Calor, at Beneventum, his army was intercepted by the praetor Tiberius Gracchus and his legions of mostly freed slaves. In the ensuing combat, Hanno's army of 17,000 foot (mostly Bruttians and Lucanians) and 1,200 horse was utterly routed, forcing Hanno to escape with only 2,000 soldiers, chiefly cavalry back to Bruttium. His situation improved when he destroyed a force of pro-Roman Lucanians in early 213 BC in Bruttium.

=== Defending Capua ===
In 212 BC, Hannibal ordered Hanno to arrange provisions for Capua, which was being threatened by the Romans. The Romans had fielded six legions, along with allied units and cavalry units, to besiege Capua (led by prefects Hanno and Bostar), which they were circumventing with double palisades. Hanno, starting from Bruttium, slipped past the army of Gracchus in Lucania, then evaded the respective armies of the two consuls in Samnium, and finally reached Beneventum. He set up camp on a hill and collected provisions from his Samnite allies, then requested some wagons from the Capuans so as to carry the provisions to Capua from his camp.

The tardiness of the Capuans, who were slow to send sufficient wagons, gave time for Quintus Fulvius Flaccus to get wind of the enterprise from loyal Italians, and he attacked the Carthaginian camp when most of Hanno's men were out foraging. Although the Carthaginians succeeded in repulsing the first assault, the Romans were galvanized by the actions of an Italian allied cohort and eventually captured all the supplies and wagons along with the camp.

Hanno, unable to do anything further for Capua, then retired to Bruttium, again evading the Roman armies that could have intercepted him in on the way.

=== Return to Africa ===
He reappears in sources as the next commander of the land armies of Carthage after the defeat of Hasdrubal Gisgo. He was replaced by Hannibal himself.

== See also ==
- Battle of Cannae
- Other Hannos in Carthaginian history
