= Lucius Veturius Philo (consul 220 BC) =

Consul of the Roman Republic
- In office 220 BC Serving with Marcus Valerius Laevinus, Quintus Mucius Scaevola and Quintus Lutatius Catullus
- Preceded by: Publius Cornelius Scipio Asina and Marcus Minucius Rufus
- Succeeded by: Lucius Aemilius Paullus and Marcus Livius Salinator

Dictator of the Roman Republic
- In office 217 BC

Censor of the Roman Republic
- In office 210 BC

Lucius Veturius Philo (d. 210 BC) was a Roman statesman who served as consul in 220 BC, dictator in 217 BC (during the Second Punic War), and censor (magistrate in charge of the census and other matters) in 210 BC. Irregularities were found in his appointment as dictator and he resigned after fourteen days. He was a member of the gens Veturia.

He was the father of another Lucius Veturius Philo, who served as consul in 206 BC (and praetor peregrinus in 209, assigned the province of Gaul).

Philo died in 210 BC, while serving as censor, before he had the chance to enter the senate or "transact any public business whatsoever". The other censor, Publius Licinius Crassus, immediately resigned the censorship upon the death of his colleague.

Political offices
Preceded by Publius Cornelius Scipio Asina; Marcus Minucius Rufus	Roman consul 220 BC; With: Gaius Lutatius Catulus	Succeeded by Lucius Aemilius Paullus; Marcus Livius Salinator
Preceded by Publius Furius Philus; Marcus Atilius Regulus	Roman censor 210 BC; With: Publius Licinius Crassus Dives	Succeeded by Marcus Cornelius Cethegus; Publius Sempronius Tuditanus
