= 216 BC =

216 BC in various calendars
Gregorian calendar	216 BC; CCXVI BC
Ab urbe condita	538
Ancient Egypt era	XXXIII dynasty, 108
Pharaoh	Ptolemy IV Philopator, 6
Ancient Greek Olympiad (summer)	141st Olympiad (victor)¹
Assyrian calendar	4535
Balinese saka calendar	N/A
Bengali calendar	−809 – −808
Berber calendar	735
Buddhist calendar	329
Burmese calendar	−853
Byzantine calendar	5293–5294
Chinese calendar	甲申年 (Wood Monkey); 2482 or 2275 — to — 乙酉年 (Wood Rooster); 2483 or 2276
Coptic calendar	−499 – −498
Discordian calendar	951
Ethiopian calendar	−223 – −222
Hebrew calendar	3545–3546
- Hindu calendars
Vikram Samvat	−159 – −158
Shaka Samvat	N/A
Kali Yuga	2885–2886
Holocene calendar	9785
Iranian calendar	837 BP – 836 BP
Islamic calendar	863 BH – 862 BH
Javanese calendar	N/A
Julian calendar	N/A
Korean calendar	2118
Minguo calendar	2127 before ROC 民前2127年
Nanakshahi calendar	−1683
Seleucid era	96/97 AG
Thai solar calendar	327–328
Tibetan calendar	ཤིང་ཕོ་སྤྲེ་ལོ་ (male Wood-Monkey) −89 or −470 or −1242 — to — ཤིང་མོ་བྱ་ལོ་ (female Wood-Bird) −88 or −469 or −1241

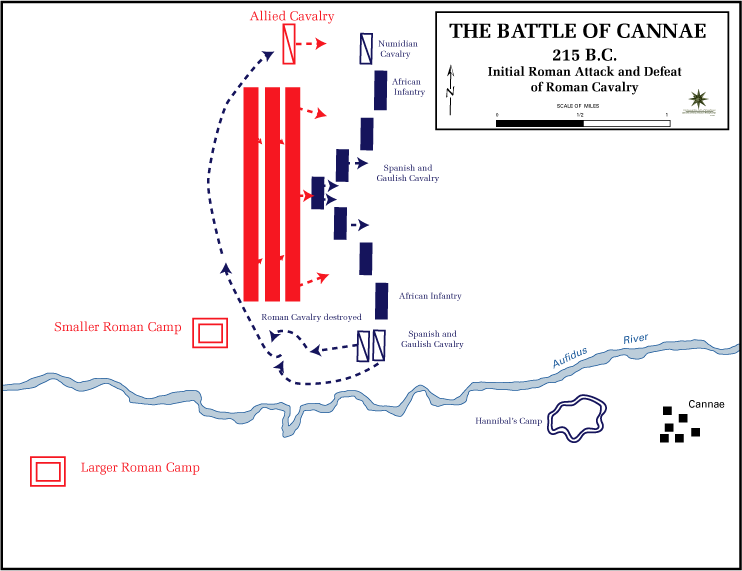
Battle of Cannae: Roman attack (red).

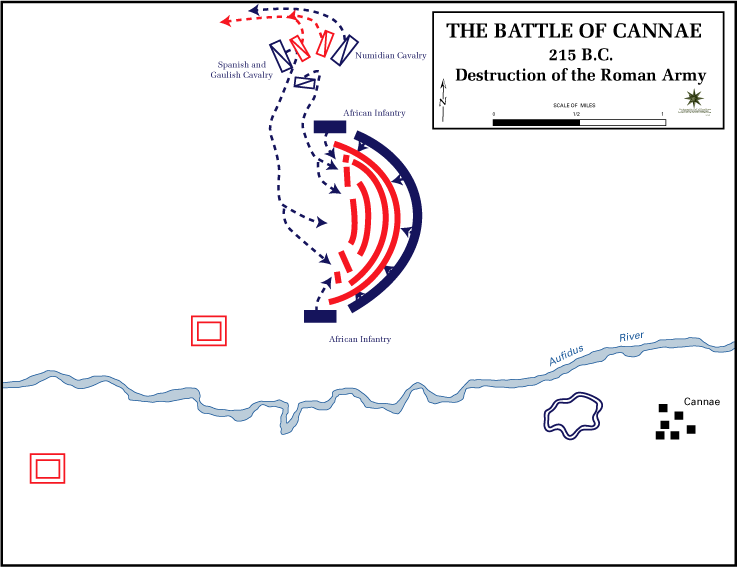
Destruction of the Roman army (red).

Year 216 BC was a year of the pre-Julian Roman calendar. At the time it was known as the Year of the Consulship of Varro and Paullus (or, less frequently, year 538 Ab urbe condita). The denomination 216 BC for this year has been used since the early medieval period, when the Anno Domini calendar era became the prevalent method in Europe for naming years.

== Events ==
=== By place ===
==== Roman Republic ====
- The Carthaginian general, Hannibal, moves his forces southward through Italy and seizes the large army supply depot at Cannae on the Aufidus River.
- August 2 – The Battle of Cannae (east of Naples) ends in victory for Hannibal whose 50,000-man army defeats a Roman force of 86,000 led by consuls Lucius Aemilius Paullus (who is killed in the battle) and Gaius Terentius Varro. 50,000-70,000 Roman troops are killed, making this perhaps the deadliest one-day battle in all history.
- A loan of money and supplies for the Roman army in Sicily is sought and obtained from Hiero II of Syracuse.
- The Roman historian Quintus Fabius Pictor is sent to Delphi in Greece to consult the Oracle for advice about what Rome should do after its defeat in the Battle of Cannae.
- Following Hannibal's victory, many regions begin to defect from Rome, while others are conquered by Hannibal's forces. In Apulia, Lucania, Samnium and in Bruttium, Hannibal finds many supporters.
- The city of Capua switches sides to join Hannibal and the Carthaginian army winters there.
- After the defeat at Cannae, Roman general, Marcus Claudius Marcellus, commands the remnants of the Roman army at Canusium and saves the city of Nola and southern Campania from occupation by Hannibal.
- A Roman force of 25,000 led by Lucius Postumius Albinus is ambushed by Gauls near Litana and almost completely wiped out.

==== Spain ====
- Hasdrubal is ordered by the Carthaginian government to march to Italy.
- Roman forces in Spain led by Gnaeus Cornelius Scipio Calvus and Publius Cornelius Scipio successfully thwart Hasdrubal's attempt to march to Italy.

==== Syracuse ====
- The Carthaginian fleet ravages the territory of The Kingdom of Syracuse.

==== Greece ====
- Philip V of Macedon, still resenting Rome's interference in Illyrian politics, seizes his opportunity to invade Illyria. Ambassadors from Philip V visit Hannibal at his headquarters in Italy. These actions mark the beginning of the First Macedonian War between Rome and Macedonia.

==== Egypt ====
- A revolt of the Egyptian peasants is put down by Ptolemy IV.

== Births ==
- Liu Pi, Chinese prince and general of the Han Dynasty (d. 154 BC)

== Deaths ==
- August 2
  - Lucius Aemilius Paullus, Roman consul and general (killed in the Battle of Cannae)
  - Gnaeus Servilius Geminus, Roman consul 217 BC (killed in the Battle of Cannae)
  - Marcus Minucius Rufus, Roman consul 221 BC, Master of the Horse 217 BC (killed in the Battle of Cannae)
- Gelo, son of Hiero II
- Marcus Aemilius Lepidus, Roman consul 232 BC and priest (augur)
