= Gaius Lutatius Catulus (consul 220 BC) =

Roman general and politician

Gaius Lutatius Catulus (fl. 220–218 BC) was a Roman statesman and general, who held the executive office of consul in 220 BC as the colleague of Lucius Veturius Philo. During their term of office, the two men led an expedition to the Julian Alps and secured the submission of several local peoples without fighting them. This was apparently a follow-up to the campaign of the previous year's consuls against the Istrians. Appian says this was a naval expedition.

In 218 BC, Catulus was member of a triumviral commission for the creation of the colonies of Placentia (Piacenza) and Cremona in Cisalpine Gaul. The Second Punic War against Carthage had just broken out, and the commissioners were surprised by an uprising of the Gallic Boii and Insubres, caused by news that the Carthaginian general Hannibal was approaching. Catulus and the others took refuge at Mutina (Modena), but were lured out and captured. The prisoners were released and returned to Rome only in 203 BC.

Catulus was presumably a son of Gaius Lutatius Catulus, consul in 242 BC.

Political offices
Preceded by Publius Cornelius Scipio Asina; Marcus Minucius Rufus	Roman consul 220 BC with Lucius Veturius Philo	Succeeded by Lucius Aemilius Paullus; Marcus Livius Salinator
