= Pitched battle =

Where both sides commit to fight at a location

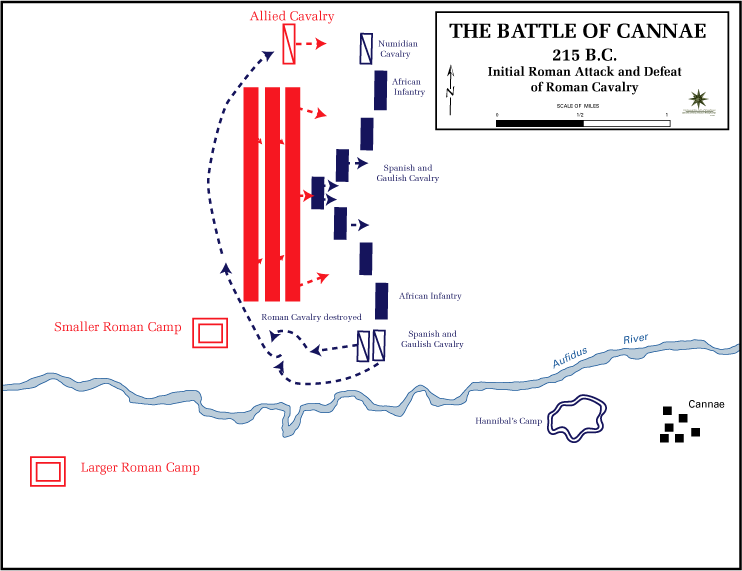
Battle of Cannae, 216 BC – Initial Roman attack

A pitched battle or set-piece battle is a battle in which opposing forces each anticipate the setting of the battle, and each chooses to commit to it. Either side may have the option to disengage before the battle starts or shortly thereafter. A pitched battle is not a chance encounter such as a meeting engagement, or where one side is forced to fight at a time not of its choosing such as happens in a siege or an ambush. Pitched battles are usually carefully planned to maximize one's strengths against an opponent's weaknesses and use deceptions, feints, and other manoeuvres. They are also planned to take advantage of terrain favourable to one's force. Forces strong in cavalry, for example, will not select swamp, forest, or mountain terrain for the planned struggle. For example, Carthaginian General Hannibal selected relatively flat ground near the village of Cannae, not the rocky terrain of the high Apennines, for his great confrontation with the Romans. Zulu Commander Shaka avoided forested areas or swamps, in favour of rolling grassland (flat or on mountain slopes), where the encircling horns of the Zulu Impi could manoeuvre to effect. A pitched battle can decide the outcome of a war or military operation. Pitched battles continued to evolve throughout history as armies implemented new technology and tactics.

During the Prehistorical period, pitched battles were established as the primary method for organised conflict and placed an emphasis on the implementation of rudimentary hand and missile weapons in loose formations. This developed into the Classical period as weapons and armour became more sophisticated and increased the efficacy of heavy infantry. Pitched battles decreased in size and frequency during the Middle Ages and saw the implementation of heavy cavalry and new counter cavalry formations. The early modern period saw the introduction of rudimentary firearms and artillery developing new tactics to respond to the rapidly changing state of gunpowder warfare. The late modern period saw improvements to firearms technology which saw the standardisation of rifle infantry, cavalry and artillery during battles. Pitched battles declined towards the late 19th century and had ceased by the First World War because of technological developments establishing trench warfare. Whilst there are a few examples of pitched battles that occurred on a large scale during the Second World War, during the Post-war period, pitched battles effectively ceased to exist because of the prevalence of irregular warfare. The largest set-piece battle in the history of warfare was the Battle of Kursk.

== Prehistorical period ==
Pitched battles were first recorded during the prehistorical period as massed organised conflict became the primary method for the expansion of territory for early states. During the Neolithic period, from 10,000 to 3000 BC, violence was experienced endemically rather than in concentrated large-scale events. Later during the prehistorical period, after 3000 BC, battles became increasingly organised and were typified by the implementation of bronze weaponry and rudimentary missile weapons.

=== Tollense valley battlefield ===
One of the earliest battles in Europe occurred in the Tollense Valley where a pitched battle was fought during the 13th century BC, consisting of at least several hundred combatants. Evidence of bronze weaponry and flint and bronze arrow heads indicates that archers were used alongside infantry during the battle. A possible reason for the battle was the attempted crossing of a river by a large group of armed men who were confronted at a ford. Archers may have been positioned at either side of the river in the attempt to cause casualties before a series of close quarter engagements. The battle at Tollense Valley demonstrates that early pitched battles in the European prehistorical period were characterised by large semi-organised groups of combatants and the implementation of simple hand and missile weapons such as bows.

=== Battle of Kadesh ===
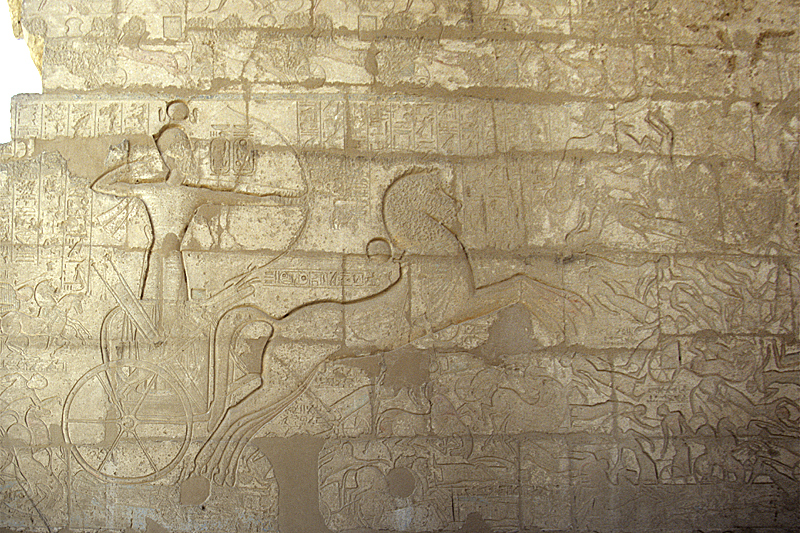
Relief depicting Egyptian chariots in the Battle of Kadesh

Elsewhere, pitched battles had grown in frequency and size because of developments in technology and logistics during the later prehistorical period. Technological improvements included the addition of iron weaponry, shields, and cavalry which were deployed in organised formations. An example of a pitched battle that demonstrated these developments was the battle of Kadesh in 1274 BC between New Kingdom Egypt under Ramses II and the Hittite Empire under Muwatalli II. Evidence from reliefs at the temple of Ramesses II depict the implementation of chariots and larger infantry formations that used spears and swords for close-quarter fighting. The battle itself occurred in three stages. Initially, Hittite chariots were deployed and charged an Egyptian division that was en route to the main Egyptian camp on the North-West side of the fortress of Kadesh. In the second phase of the battle, Ramesses II launched a chariot counterattack on the Hittite chariots which were plundering the Egyptian camp and pushed them back towards the Orontes River and main force of the Hittite army. The third stage was a dedicated series of charges launched by both sides as the Hittite reserve was positioned and refused to retreat over the river. The pitched battle resulted in an Egyptian tactical victory but a strategic stalemate for both sides.

== Classical period ==
Pitched battles continued to evolve into the Classical period as weapons technology and battlefield tactics became more complex. The widespread introduction of iron weapons increased emphasis on close quarter infantry combat as improvements in armour and larger infantry block formations made projectiles less effective. The Classical Greeks implemented a new and highly effective formation of spear infantry called a phalanx. By 550 BC the Greeks had perfected the formation, which consisted of individual soldiers called hoplites forming rows of spears and shields. These units would engage in pitched battles against enemies in tight formations that would press against the enemy. Only if one side faltered was the formation able to break and the pursuing side engage in individual arms. The success of the phalanx was demonstrated against the Persians at Marathon in 490 BC and then at Plataea in 479 BC. The Macedonians under Phillip II and Alexander the Great would develop this formation further to be deeper and wield longer spears called a sarrisa. The Macedonian phalanx was extremely successful against the Persian Empire and dominated Mediterranean warfare during the 4th and 3rd centuries BC. The effective nature of these heavy infantry formations would be further developed by the Romans who established a large professional army consisting of heavily armoured infantry units and units of auxiliaries.

=== Battle of Cannae ===
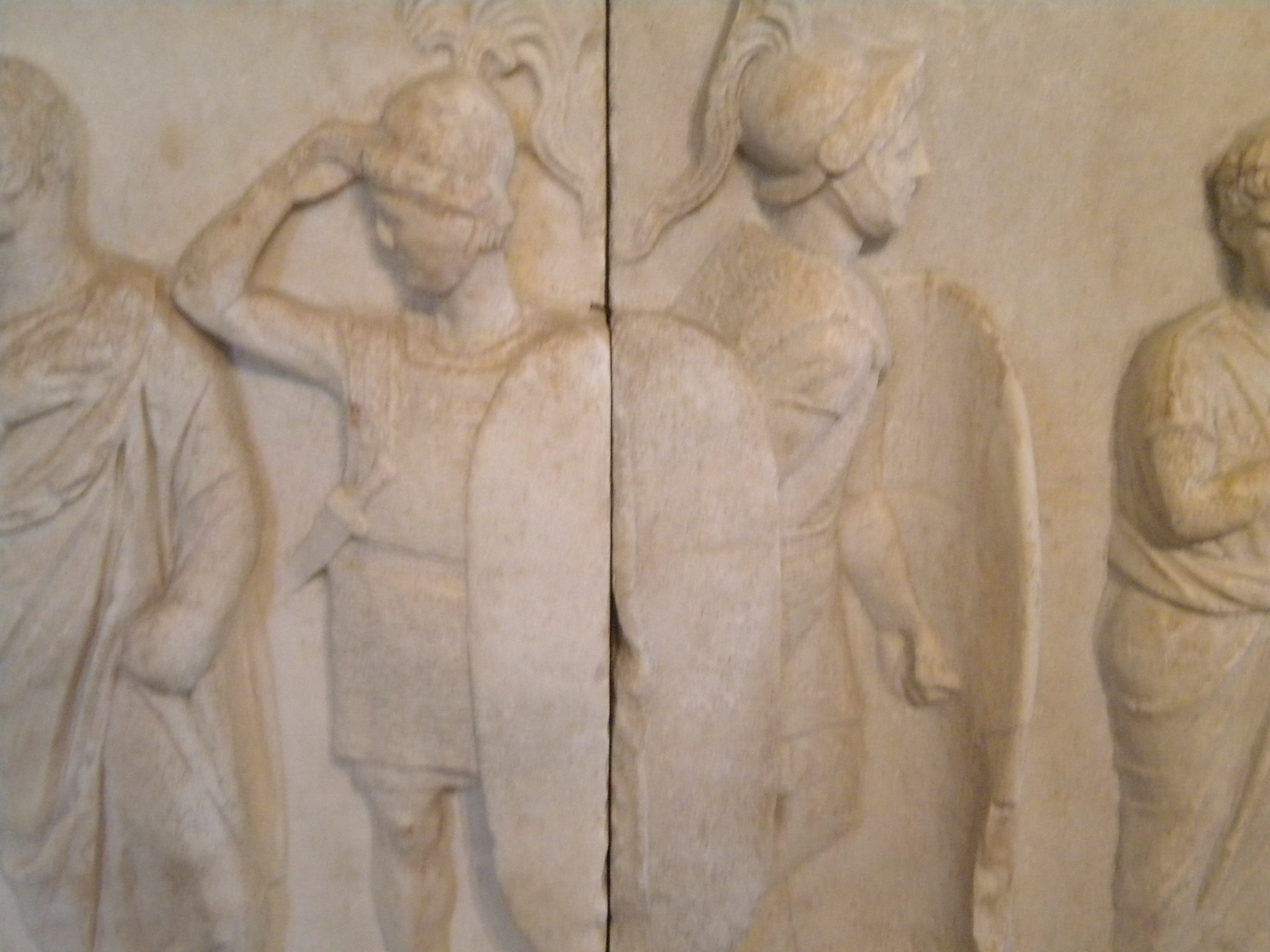
Roman heavy infantry from the 2nd century BC depicted on the Ahenobarbus relief

An example of a pitched battle that occurred during the Classical period was the battle of Cannae fought between the Roman Republic under the consuls Lucius Aemllius Paullus and Gaius Terentius Varro and the Carthaginians under Hannibal. The pitched battle occurred on 2 August 216 BC near the village of Cannae in Italy. The Romans had some 80,000 infantry and 6000 cavalry, whilst Hannibal controlled around 40,000 infantry and auxiliaries and 10,000 cavalry. The battle site was mutually decided as the flat river plain running along the river Aufidus and near the ancient village of Cannae. The Carthaginians favoured the level ground to ensure the effective deployment of cavalry and the Romans the narrow field between the river Aufidus and the village of Cannae to make full effect of their powerful infantry. Both sides carefully deployed their troops ensuring to make full advantage of their respective strategies.

The Romans had deployed their heavy infantry in a deep formation with the intention of breaking through the Carthaginian centre whilst their 6000 cavalry had been deployed on each flank positioned to defend against the superior Carthaginian cavalry. Hannibal had deployed his troops with a weak centre and reinforced flanks with the intention of letting the centre break. Behind his main line he positioned 8000 auxiliary infantry with the purpose of surprising the Roman infantry as they pursued the faltering Carthaginian centre. Hannibal was aware of the superior power of the Roman infantry and elected to out manoeuvre and trap the Romans in an encirclement. Hannibal's deployment tactic worked and although precise numbers of casualties are disputed, eight Roman legions or roughly 45,500-70,000 Roman infantry were slain. The battle resulted in a decisive victory for Hannibal and illustrates the importance of heavy infantry and advanced deployment strategies for pitched battles during the period.

== Middle Ages ==
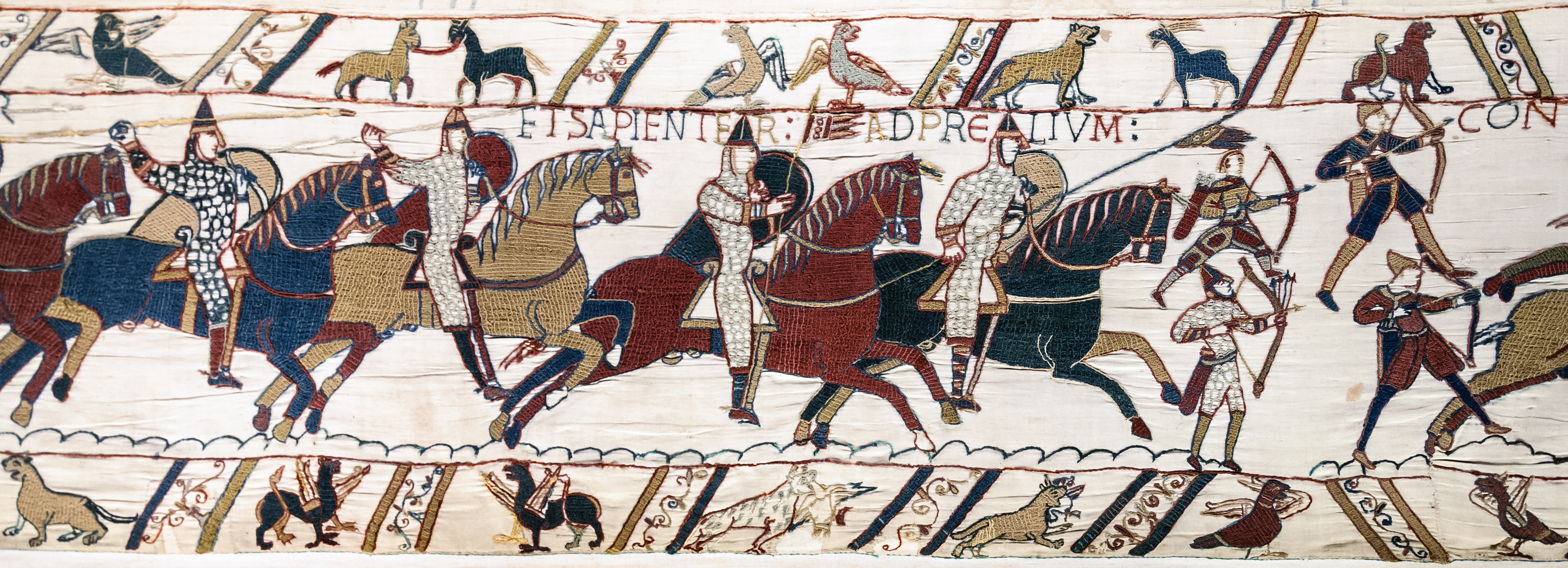
Mounted Norman knights and archers at the battle of Hastings

Pitched battles during the Middle Ages decreased in overall size and frequency because states were unable to field armies as large as those during the Classical period. The potential decisiveness and possibility of the death of the leader also decreased the number of pitched battles fought. Battlefield strategy also began to favour control through sieges and garrisons in fortifications such as castles. However, the few examples of pitched battles during the period demonstrate developments in arms and armour and their effect upon tactics and deployment. Technological improvements in metalworking permitted the increased introduction of plate armour which provided superior protection in combat. Wealthy soldiers, often called knights, would combine heavy plate armour and a mount. These would be deployed in devastatingly effective charges or dismounted to fight on foot dominating battlefields throughout the Middle Ages. Consequently, infantry tactics during pitched battles would evolve towards the late Middle Ages to emphasise the use of polearms such as pikes and halberds. Furthermore, pitched battles during this period saw the widespread introduction of the crossbow, as evidenced at the battle of Hastings, provided a powerful alternative to bows and were effective against most forms of armour.

=== Battle of Hastings ===
Deployment map of the Battle of Hastings

An important pitched battle that demonstrated the evolution of tactics and technology during the Middle Ages was the battle of Hastings fought on the 14 October 1066. This battle was fought between the Norman-French Army under William the Conqueror and the English army under Anglo-Saxon King Harold Godwinson. This pitched battle was fought as William engaged Godwinson who deployed his army of infantry in a small dense formation at the top of a steep slope. The English formation held heavy infantry, referred to as housecarls, at the centre and light infantry on the flanks. Across the front of Godwinson's battle line was a shield wall made from soldiers interlocking their shields holding spears and missile troops behind. The Normans under William deployed in three groups which consisted of their origins, Bretons on the left flank, Normans in the centre and Franco-Flemings on the right flank. William deployed his missile troops which included crossbowmen, at the front of his lines with his heavy infantry and cavalry behind. William's heavily armoured Norman knights were essential in the battle as they were deployed in cavalry feints which thinned and at occasions broke Godwinson's shield wall as they pursued fleeing Norman cavalry. The repeated implementation of this battle tactic eventually led to Norman victory in the battle as they were able to draw the English into a pursuit which was then counter charged and broken. The effective deployment of heavy cavalry by the Normans during this battle demonstrates the importance of technological improvements through arms and armour and evolving tactics to pitched battles during the Middle Ages.

== Early Modern era ==
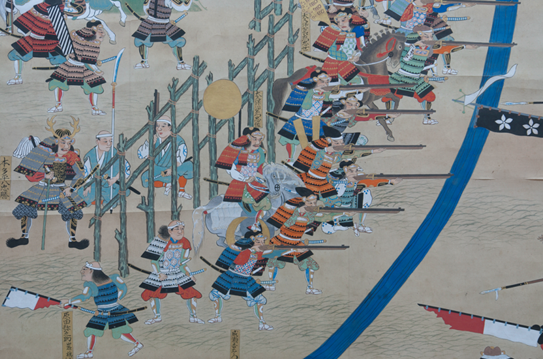
Detail of the Battle of Nagashino screen painting depicting arquebusiers of the Oda clan

Pitched battles developed significantly during the early Modern era as tactics and deployment strategies evolving rapidly with the introduction of early firearms and artillery. There was a general increase in the size of pitched battles during this period as states grew and could wield larger standing armies using improved logistics. Firearms were introduced in Europe during the 16th century and revolutionised pitched battles because of their devastating effect when fired in sequence. Despite this, early firearms were inaccurate and slow to fire meaning that they were most effectively deployed in smaller, mobile blocks of infantry who would fire a mass of projectiles at an enemy. Because these weapons were unreliable, these troops were supported by other groups of infantry, especially when confronted with enemy cavalry. In 16th century Italy, pike and shot infantry would have interweaving ranks of musket and pike armed soldiers to provide mobile cavalry protection. Furthermore, during this period artillery would evolve from basic stone throwers to barrelled cannons capable of mobility and more effective siege warfare.

=== Battle of Nagashino ===
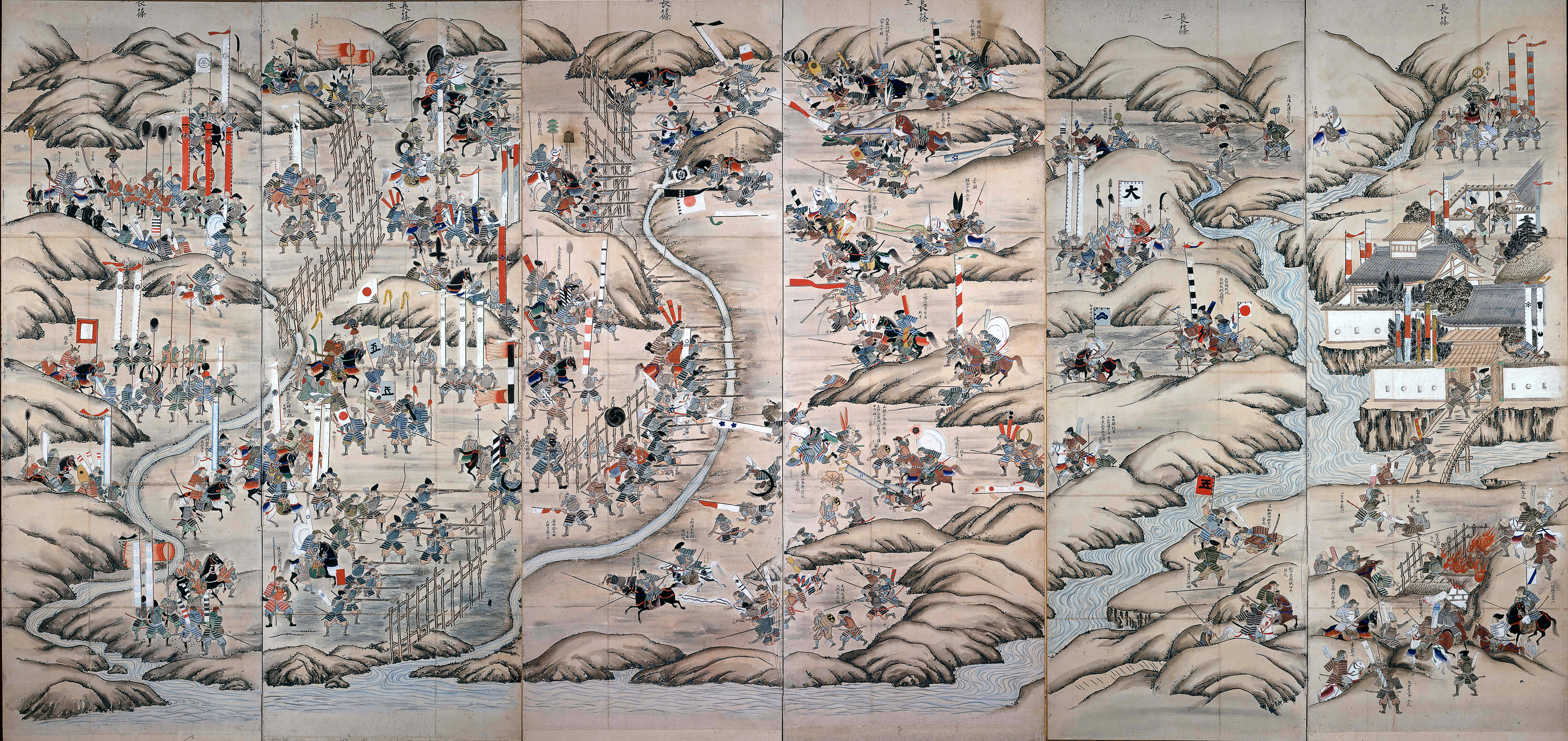
Battle of Nagashino

The battle of Nagashino was a pitched battle fought between the combined forces of Oda and Tokugawa clans against Takeda clan on 28 June 1575 during the Sengoku period in Japan. The battle occurred as Oda Nobunaga led 38,000 men to relieve Tokugawa forces besieged by Takeda Katsuyori at Nagashino Castle. This battle represents an example of a siege that develops into a pitched battle upon the arrival of new forces. Key to Oda success during the battle was the deployment of 10,000 Ashigaru arquebusiers. Firearms had been introduced to Japan by European traders as early as 1543 and were adopted quickly. Nagashino was one of the earliest examples of their effective tactical deployment. Before the battle, Nobunaga had positioned his arquebusiers in formations to be protected from enemy cavalry by supporting Ashigaru spearmen. The Takeda strategy was to utilise their superior cavalry force and make the Oda infantry flee with concentrated charges. This was unsuccessful as Oda spearmen worked in tandem with the arquebusiers who fired organised volleys in ranks of three to repel Takeda cavalry charges and achieve victory in the battle.

== Late Modern era ==
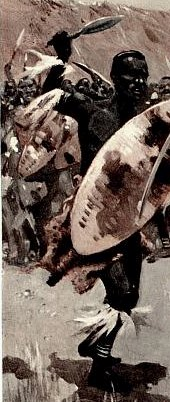
Zulu warriors charging

Firearms and artillery dominated pitched battles during the late modern period as technological improvements such as rifling improved the reliability and accuracy of the weapons. The efficacy of firearms increased dramatically during the 18th century with the introduction of rifling for enhanced range and accuracy, cartridge ammunition and magazines. As a result, most armies during this period would strictly deploy firearm infantry. Notable exceptions to this would be in colonial Africa where native armies would still employ close quarter fighting to some success, such as at the battle of Isandlwana in 1879 between the Zulu Empire and the British. The mobility and accuracy of artillery was also improved with rifling and sophisticated reload mechanisms and would be utilised to great effect alongside infantry throughout the 19th century. Furthermore, cavalry would continue to be an effective force for pitched battles during this period as they were implemented to harass infantry formations and artillery positions. These tactics would remain in warfare until developments in technology would make pitched battles less effective towards the end of the 19th century.

=== Battle of Isandlwana ===
The Battle of Isandlwana was fought between the Zulu Empire and the British Empire on 22 January 1879. This pitched battle saw the implementation of superior tactics to overwhelm a technologically superior force. The Zulu army usually deployed in its well known "buffalo horns" formation. The attack layout was composed of three elements:

1. the "horns" or flanking right and left wing elements to encircle and pin the enemy. Usually these were the greener troops.
2. the "chest" or central main force which delivered the coup de grace. The prime fighters made up the composition of the main force.
3. the "loins" or reserves used to exploit success or reinforce elsewhere.

The Zulu forces were generally grouped into 3 levels: regiments; corps of several regiments; and "armies" or bigger formations. With enough manpower, these could be marshaled and maneuvered in the Western equivalent of divisional strength. Coordination of tactical movements was supplied by the indunas who used hand signals and messengers. Generally before deploying for combat, the regiments were made to squat in a semicircle. This semi-circular squat served to align all echelons towards the coming pitched battle, while the commanders made final assignments and adjustments. While formidable in action, the Zulu arrangements for a pitched struggle could be predictable, as they usually used the same 3-part layout in their operations.

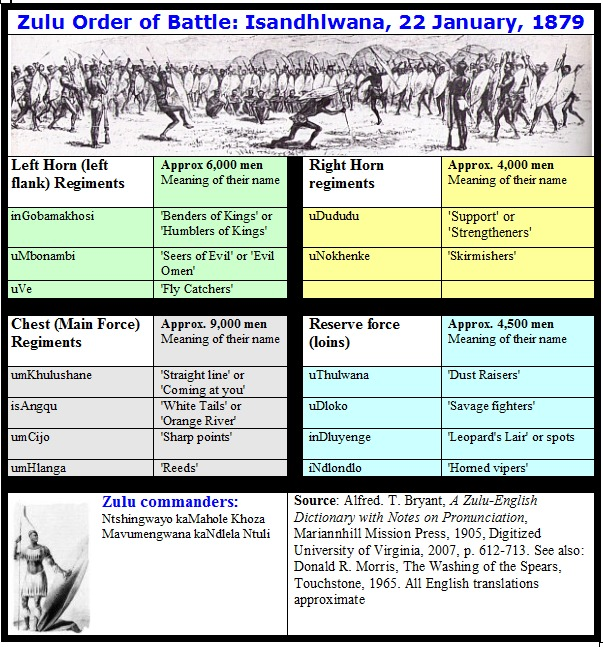
Zulu order of battle

At Isandlwana, Zulu forces first lured the British into splitting their strength by diversionary actions around Magogo Hills and Mangeni Falls, and then moved to take advantage of this British error in a careful approach march, using dispersed units that hid the full strength of the army. As one historian notes:

Meanwhile, the joint Zulu commanders, who had indeed been considering a flank march to Chelmsford's east to join with Matshana and cut the British column off from Natal, decided instead to take advantage of the general's division of forces. They detached men to reinforce Matshana, but on the same evening of 21 January and during the next they transferred the main army across the British front to the deep shelter of the Ngwebeni valley. This was truly a masterful manoeuvre. The amabutho moved rapidly in small units, mainly concealed from the Isandlwana camp nine miles away by the Nyoni Heights. The British mounted patrols that sighted some of the apparently isolated Zulu units had no inkling an entire army was on the move.

The total Zulu host was then concentrated in a deep ravine near the enemy position, pre-positioned for their classic "buffalo horns" pitched attack, but in accordance with tradition, waiting until the omens were good for an assault. Discovered by a British cavalry patrol, the entire Impi sprang up as one man, and launched their attack from some 4 miles away. The advance was met by withering British rifle, rocket and artillery fire that made part of the advance falter. The British however had divided their forces- fooled in part by preliminary Zulu feints- and other errors, such as failure to base the camp on a strong central wagon or laager fortification for example also contributed to fatal weaknesses in the British defences. When pressure by the maneuvering Zulu formations caused the crumbling of the redcoat line, the Zulu prongs surged through and around the gaps, annihilating the camp's defenders. The liquidation of almost 1,000 European troops with modern arms by the African spearmen sparked disbelief and uproar in Britain. Aside from the losses of British regulars, and the supporting native levies, the Zulu impi killed more British officers at Isandlwana than Napoleon killed at Waterloo.

== World Wars ==
Towards the late 19th century and into the World Wars of the 20th century, pitched battles decreased in frequency because of the increasing size of armies and developments in weapons technology. Larger armies meant that combat could not be resolved in single events and the introduction of the machine gun, advanced artillery, and barbed wire by the First World War meant that deploying infantry in large moveable blocks was ineffective as they could be easily made immobile and destroyed. Barbed wire alone brought an end to the deployment of cavalry as they would be rendered immobile and made easy targets. Developments in tactics would emphasise fortified positions in trenches and would result in battles that would take months and be determined by attrition and supply rather than tactics and mobility. The introduction of mechanised armour and aircraft in the late First World War meant that trench warfare would be less effective as trenches could be outmanoeuvred and surrounded. This was demonstrated clearly during the early stages of The Second World War during the German Blitzkrieg in France. Tactics in the Second World War developed to focus on mobile groups of infantry who would work in tandem with armour, aircraft and artillery to out manoeuvre and surround enemy positions. This would generally result in many smaller skirmishes along a wide battle front rather than localised pitched battles. However, during the war, there would be several important battles that would employ pitched battle tactics at a larger scale.

=== Battle of Caen ===
The British shield in the east held the bulk of the German armour fast and worked it over, until the Americans were able to break through in the west, destroying the German front.

During the Normandy landings under Operation Overlord, the Allies engaged in a pitched battle on a massive scale to defeat German resistance. When the Allies landed at Normandy, the pitched battle strategy used by the commander of the British land forces, general Bernard Montgomery, was to confront German armoured units with constant harassment from British armies on the eastern flank of the beachhead. The role of the British forces would be to act as a great shield for the Allied landing, constantly sucking the German armour on to that shield on the left (east), and constantly grinding it down with punishing blows from artillery, tanks and Allied aircraft. As the shield held the Germans, the Americans were to push in the west on the right of the Allied line, breaking through the German defences. The British role in the strategy would thus not be a glamorous one, but a brutal battle in a punishing cauldron of attrition, in and around the key city of Caen.

Supreme Allied Commander Dwight D. Eisenhower affirmed Montgomery's overall strategy in a message of 10 July, urging stronger efforts:

I am familiar with your plan for generally holding firmly with your left, attracting thereto all of the enemy armour, while your right pushes down the Peninsula and threatens the rear and flank of the forces facing the Second British Army.. It appears to me that we must use all possible energy in a determined effort to prevent a stalemate or facing the necessity of fighting a major defensive battle with the slight depth we now have in the bridgehead... please be assured that I will produce everything that is humanly possible to assist you in any plan that promises to get us the elbow room we need. The air and everything else will be available.

Operation Overlord
- Operational scope: Strategic offensive
- Planned by: Allies
- Objective: Invasion of Normandy
- Date: Began 6 June 1944
- Executed by: Allied forces

Montgomery's overall pitched conception of the battle eventually bore fruit, but it took two months of bitter fighting in and around the city of Caen to come to fruition.

== Post-war ==
During the post-war period, pitched battles became outdated because of increasing emphasis on camouflage, guerrilla warfare and strategic bombing, all of which prevented the large-scale deployment of organised units of troops. Battles became increasingly reliant upon many smaller skirmishes along a frontline or sporadic combat in an area of hostility and no longer resembled pitched battles in any form.

== See also ==
- Battle
- List of battles
- Military tactics
- Naval battle
- War
- Meeting engagement
- Siege
- Ambush

== Bibliography ==
- "Policy of the Protectionists". Blackwood's Edinburgh Magazine. 71 (440): 645–68. June 1852. Archived from the original on 2015-09-23.
