= Marcus Valerius Laevinus =

Roman general and statesman, Second Punic War, First Macedonian War

Marcus Valerius Laevinus (c. 260 BC – 200 BC) was a Roman consul and commander who rose to prominence during the Second Punic War and corresponding First Macedonian War. A member of the gens Valeria, an old patrician family believed to have migrated to Rome under the Sabine king T. Tatius, Laevinus played an integral role in the containment of the Macedonian threat.

== Background and early career ==
Map showing Apulia, where Laevinus was stationed in 215 BC.

Laevinus was the son of P. Valerius Laevinus, and grandson of P. Valerius Laevinus. The latter may have been the consul of 280 BC whom Pyrrhus of Epirus defeated at Heraclea.

Praetor in Sicily in 227, Marcus Laevinus was first elected consul in 220. His consulship, however, was annulled, likely due to accusations of a faulty election.

In 215, during the Second Punic War, Laevinus was elected praetor peregrinus with command of the Roman forces in Apulia. Stationed in Brundisium, Laevinus was appointed to act as a deterrent to any potential advance from the Macedonian king, Philip V, who had allied his forces with the Carthaginian general Hannibal Barca who had invaded Italy. Valerius was thereby tasked with monitoring activities on the Adriatic Sea, through which he assumed command over the bulk of the Roman fleet.

== First Macedonian War ==
The Mediterranean during 218 BC, showing Italy, Carthage, and Greece.

As praetor peregrinus, Laevinus commanded the Roman fleet off the Adriatic coast during the First Macedonian War, which occurred contemporaneously with the Second Punic War against Carthage.

Rome's preoccupation with war against Carthage provided an opportunity for Philip V of Macedon to extend his power westward. Following the Carthaginian victory over Rome at Cannae in 216, Philip sent ambassadors to Hannibal's camp in Italy to negotiate an alliance against Rome. On their journey back to Macedon, the emissaries were captured by P. Valerius Flaccus, commander of the Roman fleet patrolling the southern Apulian coast. A letter from Hannibal to Philip, as well as the terms of their agreement, was discovered, much to Rome's dismay.

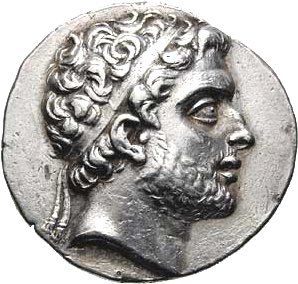
Coin of Philip V of Macedon, whom Laevinus fought against in the First Macedonian War.

Laevinus, who was stationed at Brundisium, was given command of two legions and a fleet of fifty-five ships. With these, he was tasked with guarding the Italian Adriatic coast and monitoring Philip's movements. If they were hostile, Laevinus was to cross the Adriatic and keep Philip confined to Macedon, so as to prevent him from providing any assistance to Hannibal in Italy.

Throughout 214, Laevinus’ forces provided aid to several Roman allies under Macedonian threat. He successfully recaptured Oricum from the Macedonians by conducting an attack at night, thereby ambushing Philip's army. According to Livy, the Macedonians feared him so much they burned their boats to avoid facing his ships again. Laevinus also relieved the siege of Apollonia and saved Tarentum.

Map depicting Macedon in orange, and the Aetolian League in grey.

=== The Aetolian League ===
Preoccupied by the ongoing conflict with Hannibal and the Carthaginians, Rome was unable to send a force large enough to effectively deal with the Macedonian threat. Instead, they decided to form an alliance with one of Macedonia's long-term enemies in Greece, the Aetolians.

In 212 BC, Laevinus was sent to begin negotiations with both the Aetolian League and Attalus I of Pergamum, which successfully concluded in the autumn of 211. The provisions of the treaty were generous to the Aetolians, but they were expected to do the bulk of the fighting, with Rome supplying naval support.

Following the agreement, Laevinus wasted no time; he captured Zakynthos, and the Arcananian cities of Oeniadae and Nasos before wintering on Corcyra.

== Governorship of Sicily ==
In late 211, Laevinus was sent to Sicily as governor in place of M. Claudius Marcellus. At the time, an officer of the Carthaginian army on Sicily called Mutines, a Liby-Phoenician rather than a pure-blooded Carthaginian, had been replaced as commander of the Numidian cavalry. He betrayed Agrigentum to the Romans in revenge for the demotion. According to Livy, Laevinus treated the city's leading citizens brutally to make an example of them. Shortly after, he received voluntary surrenders from forty Sicilian towns, and captured another twenty-six by betrayal or force, thus ending the war in Sicily.

== 210 BC consulship and proconsulship ==
=== Consulship ===
The following spring, whilst besieging Anticyra in the Gulf of Corinth, Laevinus received news that he had been elected consul in absentia, with M. Claudius Marcellus (IV) as his colleague. P. Sulpicius took over his duties in the east, and Laevinus withdrew to Rome.

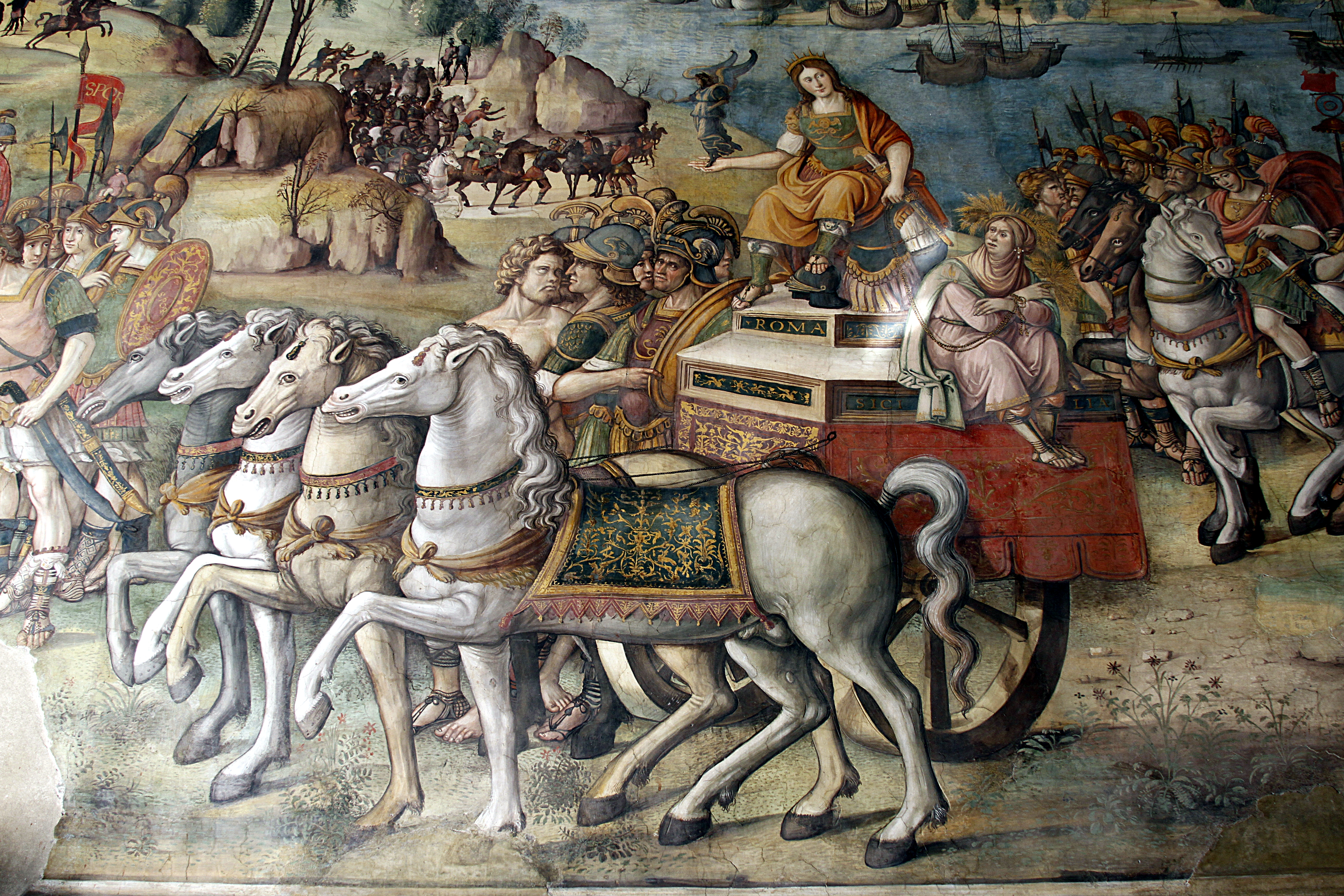
Triumph of Rome over Sicily by Jacopo Ripanda, depicting Rome's conquest of Sicily.

Livy describes both Laevinus and Marcellus as "fond of war... over-enterprising and impetuous", and states that they would have most likely allowed the war against Carthage and Macedonia to continue—which, indeed, they did. Their election was plagued with controversy, as Marcellus was accused by Syracusans of committing acts of brutality in Sicily. Although he was found not guilty, the Senate swapped the commands of the consuls, sending Marcellus to fight Hannibal and placing Laevinus in charge of Sicily.

==== Senatorial donations to the public treasury ====
Whilst Laevinus was in Rome, he was confronted with a lack of public funds and the distressing state of the public treasury after years of war. In response to this, the consuls demanded that the citizens supply funds to the treasury to finance the conscription of oarsmen. The citizens, however, stood vehemently against this, since the same measures had been implemented in 214 with little success, and the Senate withdrew the plan.

Due to the severity of the situation, Livy records that Laevinus instead proposed to the senators that they themselves should be the ones to shoulder these costs. The senators eventually agreed, donating many of their precious metals. The equites imitated their example, raised enough funds for the oarsmen, and the consuls sailed to their respective provinces. Nevertheless, after his consulship, Laevinus proposed that senators be refunded for this donation in three stages. Only the first two, however, were repaid as the third instalment came at another time of economic instability.

==== The consular elections for 209 ====
As it was necessary for at least one consul to preside over the election of their successors, Laevinus returned from Sicily to Rome to conduct the consular elections for 209. The Senate likely sent for him instead of Marcellus as he had conquered Sicily by that time, whereas Marcellus' battle against Hannibal was still rife.

In Rome, Laevinus received information about a Carthaginian plan for the recovery of Sicily, and desired to return there as quickly as possible. In response, the Senate asked him to name a dictator to conduct the elections in his absence. Laevinus nominated his cousin M. Valerius Messala, his praefectus classis, but the Senate refused since he was not in Italy. Frustrated, Laevinus returned secretly to Sicily.

Laevinus had forbidden the praetor from bringing a motion to the people for the appointment of a dictator, but as he was no longer in Italy, the tribunes ignored his order. Thus, Q. Fulvius Flaccus was elected dictator, with P. Licinius Crassus as magister equitum.

=== Proconsulship ===
After his consulship, Laevinus was granted imperium as a proconsul in Sicily, holding the office until 206. There, he commanded a fleet, received troops from defeated Italian armies, and was tasked with guarding the grain supply. During this time, he actively promoted agriculture in Sicily, re-establishing cereal farming. In 209, he was able to send supplies to Rome and Polybius states that he ensured a significant part of the grain supply for the future.

Laevinus also occasionally led his fleet to Africa for raids and to battle against Carthaginian fleets.

== Later career ==
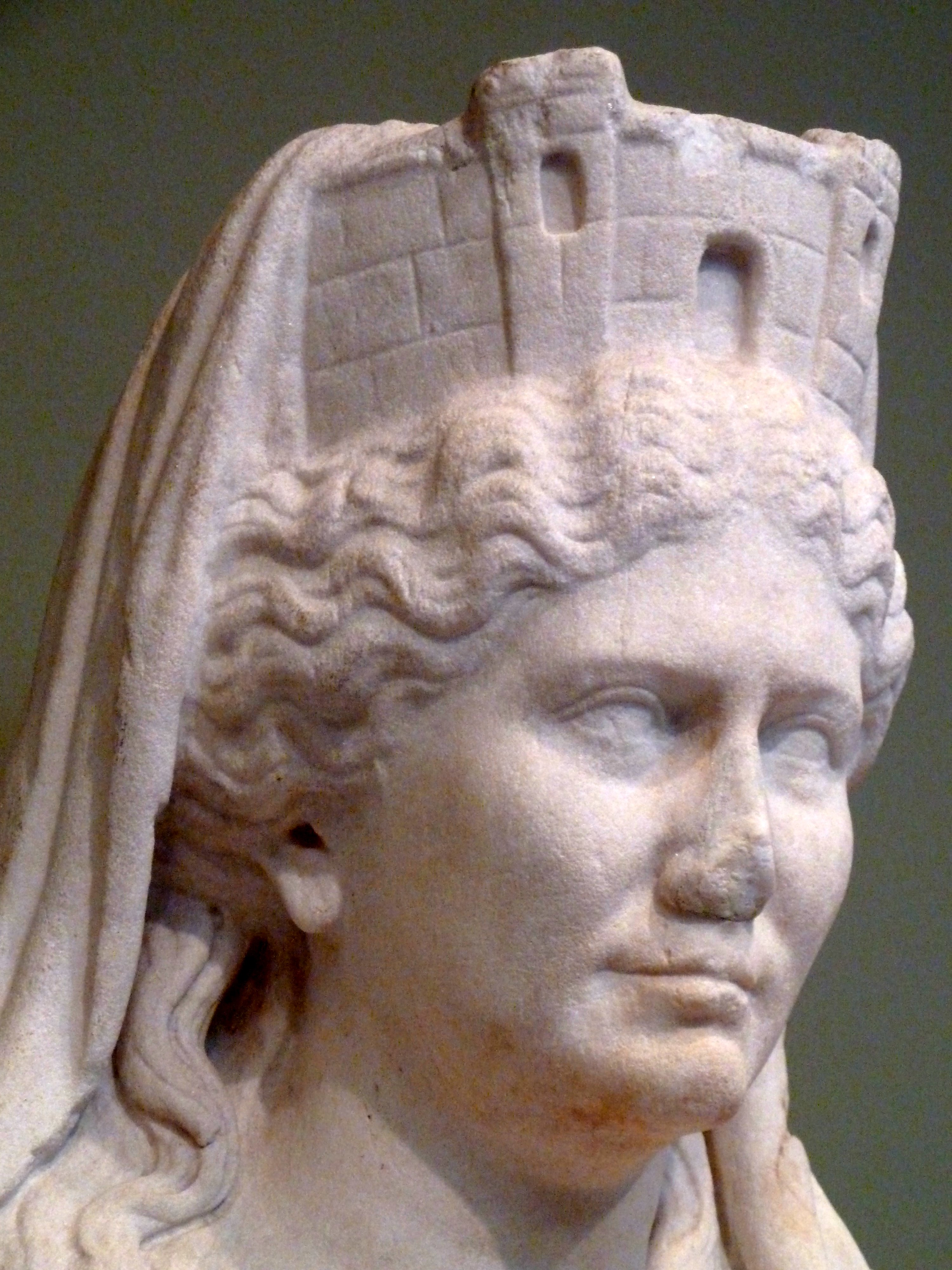
Statue of Cybele.

Sources which chronicle Laevinus’ later career are scarce. However, from what survives it is possible to construct a brief overview of his final years.

In 205, following his recall to Italy the year before, it appears that Laevinus was involved in the Roman embassy tasked with transporting the sacred stone of Cybele from Phrygia back to the capital, in response to a consultation of the Sybilline Books.

In 203, Laevnius urged the Senate to set aside the peace P. Cornelius Scipio had negotiated with the Carthaginians. His proposal passed, but Scipio's terms were later ratified.

Following this, it appears that Laevinus was dispatched to Greece in 200, and he died later that year.

== Discussion of sources ==
Although born 150 years after the events of Laevinus' life, Livy's account of the Second Punic War provides the most detailed narrative of Laevinus' career. One must, however, be wary of Livy's pro-Roman bias, which tends to emphasise Roman victory and virtue.

Other ancient accounts which refer to Laevinus include those of Polybius, Eutropius, Plutarch, Cicero, and Solinus.

There is no modern historical work which solely discusses Laevinus, but he appears in narratives and analyses of the Punic Wars. These include Dexter Hoyos's Companion to the Punic Wars (2011), Nathan Rosenstein's Rome and the Mediterranean 209–146 BC (2012), Rachel Feig Vishnia's State, Society, and Popular Leaders in Mid-Republican Rome, 241–167 BC (1996), and H.H. Scullard's Roman Politics, 220–150 BC (1973). T. Robert S. Broughton's Magistrates of the Roman Republic (1951–1960) provides an overview of the political offices which Laevinus held.

== Sources ==
Political offices
Preceded by Publius Cornelius Scipio Asina and Marcus Minucius Rufus	Consul of the Roman Republic with Quintus Mucius Scaevola; 220 BC	Succeeded by Quintus Lutatius Catulus (suffect) and Lucius Veturius Philo (suffect)
Preceded by Publius Sulpicius Galba Maximus and Gnaeus Fulvius Centumalus Maximus	Consul of the Roman Republic with Marcus Claudius Marcellus; 210 BC	Succeeded by Quintus Fabius Maximus Verrucosus and Quintus Fulvius Flaccus
