= Publius Cornelius Scipio Asina =

Roman politician and general

Publius Cornelius Scipio Asina (c. 260 BC – after 211 BC) was a Roman politician and general who served as consul in 221 BC, and as such campaigned against the Histri, a people in the northern Adriatic. Asina belonged to the Scipionic-Aemilian faction which dominated Roman politics at the beginning of the Second Punic War, and advocated for an aggressive policy against Hannibal. This stance led him to oppose the more prudent strategy of Fabius Maximus. He was notably appointed Interrex in 216 BC, probably in order to manipulate the elections.

Asina was also a founder of Piacenza.

== Family background ==
Asina was a member of the patrician gens Cornelia, one of the leading gentes throughout the Republic. Members of the gens had held 29 consulships before him. The Scipiones were one of the stirpes of the Cornelii that emerged during the fourth century, and by Asina's time it had become very influential. All his known relatives were consul in the third century: Asina's father Gnaeus Scipio Asina in 260 and 254, his grandfather Scipio Barbatus in 298, his uncle Lucius Scipio in 259, and his cousins Publius Scipio in 218 and Gnaeus Scipio Calvus in 222, the year before Asina's own consulship.

His father served during the First Punic War, but his capture by the Carthaginians in 260 earned him the unsavoury agnomen Asina ("she-ass"), which was retained by his son. Gnaeus Scipio Asina was later exchanged against Carthaginian prisoners. He however had a more successful second consulship, as he captured Panormos in Sicily and was granted a triumph as a result.

== Career ==
=== Consulship (221–220 BC) ===
Due to the loss of Livy's books covering the period between 293 and 218, nothing is known on Asina's career before his election to the consulship in 221. He was elected alongside the plebeian Marcus Minucius Rufus. Cassiodorus, who relied on Livy for his list of consuls, describes Asina as the consul prior, which means the Centuriate Assembly elected him before Rufus. The years between 222 and 216 saw the domination of the Aemilian-Scipionic faction. Their members received seven of the eight patrician consulship available. Most of the plebeian consuls elected during this period were also their allies, such as M. Livius Salinator (219), Ti. Sempronius Longus (218), C. Flaminius (217), C. Terentius Varro (216), and therefore Minucius Rufus in 221.

Asina and Rufus were sent in northeastern Italy, to wage a campaign against the Histri, a people living in the Istrian peninsula. Ancient authors tell that they were pirates that threatened navigation in the Adriatic Sea, but the consuls' campaign was part of a planned strategy of securing the northern border of the Republic. The previous consuls had indeed campaigned against the Celts of the Po Valley. This strategy may have been triggered by the fear of an incoming war with Carthage, which prompted the Senate to remove the threat of being attacked from the back while dealing with the Punic forces.

=== Triumvir for the foundation of Placentia (218 BC) ===
Location of Placentia in Italy

In 218, Asina was a member of a commission of three men sent in northern Italy to consolidate the northern frontier with the foundation of the colony of Placentia (now Piacenza in Emilia-Romagna). His cousin Scipio Calvus and Publius Papirius Maso were the two other members of the commission. Another commission founded Cremona at the same time.

=== Interrex (217 BC) ===
Asina played a role in the contentious consular elections of 217, which returned the consuls for 216: Aemilius Paullus and Terentius Varro, who were soon defeated at the catastrophic Battle of Cannae by Hannibal. The two main sources on the elections are Polybius and Livy, but their accounts are dubious. Both authors try to put the blame of the defeat on Varro and absolve Paullus. The latter was the natural grandfather of Scipio Aemilianus, the patron and friend of Polybius, who therefore says that Varro took the decision to engage the force of Hannibal against Paullus. Livy's goal was different. Throughout his history he favours conservative politicians over populist agitators, and this led him to invent an opposition between Varro the reckless novus homo, and Paullus, the consul supported by the senate. Livy tells that Varro forced the confrontation with Hannibal, while the senate preferred following the delaying strategy defined by Fabius Maximus.

In 217 BC, he was chosen as Interrex to conduct consular elections. The election was marked by a contentious struggle between the plebeians and patricians.

=== Debate over the defence of Rome (211 BC) ===
In 211, the city of Capua, which had defected to Hannibal, was besieged by the Roman army headed by Quintus Fulvius Flaccus. Hannibal tried unsuccessfully several times to lift the siege, and finally decided to march on Rome in order to force the army besieging Capua to rescue its capital. However, some Punic deserters informed Fulvius of the move, who then passed the information to the senate. A debate then took place on the strategy to adopt. Livy tells that Asina argued in favour of recalling the armies scattered over Italy for the defence of Rome. Fabius Maximus had the opposite view, saying it was just a deceiving tactic from Hannibal, who only wanted to lift the siege of Capua with no desire to take Rome, and therefore nothing should be done. Finally, Publius Valerius Flaccus (consul in 227) proposed a compromise of asking the generals in Capua whether they could send a part of their army to defend Rome. The latter opinion prevailed.

== Bibliography ==
=== Ancient sources ===
- Cassiodorus, Chronica (English translation by Bouke Procee)
- Livy, Ab Urbe Condita (English translation by Rev. Canon Roberts on Wikisource), Periochae (English translation by Jona Lendering on Livius.org).

=== Modern sources ===
- T. Robert S. Broughton, The Magistrates of the Roman Republic, American Philological Association, 1951–1952.
- J. A. Crook, F. W. Walbank, M. W. Frederiksen, R. M. Ogilvie (editors), The Cambridge Ancient History, vol. VIII, Rome and the Mediterranean to 133 B.C., Cambridge University Press, 1989.
- Henri Etcheto, Les Scipions. Famille et pouvoir à Rome à l’époque républicaine, Bordeaux, Ausonius Éditions, 2012.
- Francis X. Ryan, Rank and Participation in the Republican Senate, Stuttgart, Franz Steiner Verlag, 1998.
- Howard Hayes Scullard, Roman Politics 220–150 B. C., Oxford University Press, 1951.
- Lily Ross Taylor and T. Robert S. Broughton, "The Order of the Two Consuls' Names in the Yearly Lists", Memoirs of the American Academy in Rome, 19 (1949), pp. 3–14.
- Briggs L. Twyman, "The Consular Elections for 216 B.C. and the Lex Maenia de Patrum Auctoritate", in Classical Philology, Vol. 79, No. 4 (Oct., 1984), pp. 285–294.
- F. W. Walbank, A. E. Astin, M. W. Frederiksen, R. M. Ogilvie (editors), The Cambridge Ancient History, vol. VII, part 2, The Rise of Rome to 220 B.C., Cambridge University Press, 1989.

Political offices
| Preceded by Marcus Claudius Marcellus, and Gnaeus Cornelius Scipio Calvus | Consul of the Roman Republic; 221 BC with Marcus Minucius Rufus | Succeeded by Marcus Valerius Laevinus, and Quintus Mucius Scaevola |
