= Hasdrubal (quartermaster) =

Carthaginian officer in the Second Punic War

Hasdrubal (Punic: 𐤏𐤆𐤓𐤁𐤏𐤋, ʿAzrubaʿal, "Help of Baal") was a Carthaginian officer in the Second Punic War. After the Battle of Ticinus, Hannibal led his army east along the Po River to catch the Roman army. When a convenient place was found to cross the army began building rafts, Hasdrubal supervised the main force's crossing.

Q. Fabius Maximus Verrucosus, who had just been appointed dictator in late 218, planned to cut off Hannibal's route to potential winter quarters. Fabius correctly found the passage through the Apennines that Hannibal's army was to cross. Hasdrubal worked with army-servants to tie bundles of wood to the horns of cattle. During the night the bundles were lit on fire as the cattle crossed over the mountain. This provided such a distraction that Hannibal was able to lead the main army with all its supplies through the pass without having to fight. In the morning Hannibal sent his Spaniards to retrieve the spearmen who stayed with Hasdrubal to create the distraction. Around 1,000 Romans were killed as the spearmen were retrieved.

At the Battle of Cannae Hasdrubal led the Spanish and Celtic cavalry on the left (north, near the Aufidus River) of the Carthaginian army. Hasdrubal was given about 6,500 cavalry as opposed to Hanno's 3,500 Numidians. Hasdrubal's force was able to quickly destroy the Roman cavalry (on the south), pass the Roman's infantry rear, and reach the Roman allied cavalry while they were engaged with Hanno's Numidians. Once the Romans' allied cavalry was destroyed, Hanno and Hasdrubal were able to lead both groups of cavalry into the Roman rear.

== See also ==
- Other Hasdrubals in Carthaginian history
