= Meeting engagement =

Unexpected military combat

In warfare, a meeting engagement, or encounter battle, is a combat action that occurs when a moving force, incompletely deployed for battle, engages an enemy at an unexpected time and place.

== Description ==
Such encounters normally occur by chance in small unit operations, typically when two moving forces collide unexpectedly. Engagements involving larger units may occur when intelligence, surveillance, or reconnaissance operations have been ineffective. Meeting engagements can also occur when opposing forces are aware of the general presence but not the exact location of each other and both decide to attack immediately.

On contact, commanders quickly act to gain the advantage. Speed of action and movement, coupled with both direct and indirect fire, are essential. To maintain momentum, lead elements quickly bypass or fight through light resistance. Freedom to maneuver is always advantageous; however, commanders may choose to establish a hasty defense if the enemy force is larger or the terrain offers a significant benefit.

If both sides choose to reinforce their position instead of disengaging, then what started out as a skirmish may turn into a pitched battle, as happened at the Battle of Gettysburg during the American Civil War and the Battle of Mars-la-Tour during the Franco-Prussian War.
