= Marcus Atilius Regulus (consul 227 BC) =

Ancient Roman politician and general

Marcus Atilius Regulus (fl. 227–214 BC) was a Roman politician and statesman. He was consul in 227 and 217 BC and later censor in 214 BC. He was the son of his homonymous father who was consul in 267 and 256 BC.

He was first elected consul in 227 BC; nothing is known of this first consulship. He was later elected to a suffect consul in 217 BC, in place of Gaius Flaminius, who had been killed at the Battle of Lake Trasimene. Later in the year, he took command of the army that had been under the dictator that year, Quintus Fabius Maximus Verrucosus, and avoided any major engagement with Hannibal. His command was prorogued into 216 BC, when he returned to Rome and was elected triumvir mensarius (a public banker).

Livy reports that he laid down his command before the new consuls of 216 BC, citing old age. However, Polybius reports that Regulus and his consular colleague of 217 BC, Gnaeus Servilius Geminus, were killed as part of the army defeated at Cannae. However, it is clear that Regulus survived the battle, if he even took part, because he was elected censor two years later in 214 BC.

During his censorship, he was strict towards those who attempted to evade military service after Cannae and those who had broken oaths to rejoin the Romans after being captured by Hannibal. With the support of donations from businessmen, he was able to find the funds needed to maintain various temples that the state treasury – being empty – could not support. He and his colleague probably appointed Marcus Fabius Buteo as princeps senatus. However, Regulus was compelled to step down before completing the lustrum when his colleague, Publius Furius Philus, died unexpectedly.

Klaus Zmeskal, in Adfinitas, notes no familial relation between this Regulus and the Gaius Atilius Regulus who was consul in 225 BC. Another Marcus Atilius Regulus is noted as praetor urbanus in 213 BC, but T.R.S. Broughton notes this as a separate person. In notes, Broughton further explains that the textual tradition is unclear: this Atilius may in fact be an Aemilius and others have suggested Serranus as cognomen rather than Regulus.

Preceded by Spurius Carvilius Maximus Ruga and Quintus Fabius Maximus Verrucosus	Consul of the Roman Republic with Publius Valerius Flaccus; 227 BC	Succeeded by Marcus Valerius Messalla and Lucius Apustius Fullo
Preceded by Gnaeus Servilius Geminus and Gaius Flaminius	Consul (Suffect) of the Roman Republic with Gnaeus Servilius Geminus; 217 BC	Succeeded by Gaius Terentius Varro and Lucius Aemilius Paullus
