= Lucius Aemilius Paullus (consul 219 BC) =

Roman general and senator (died 216 BC)

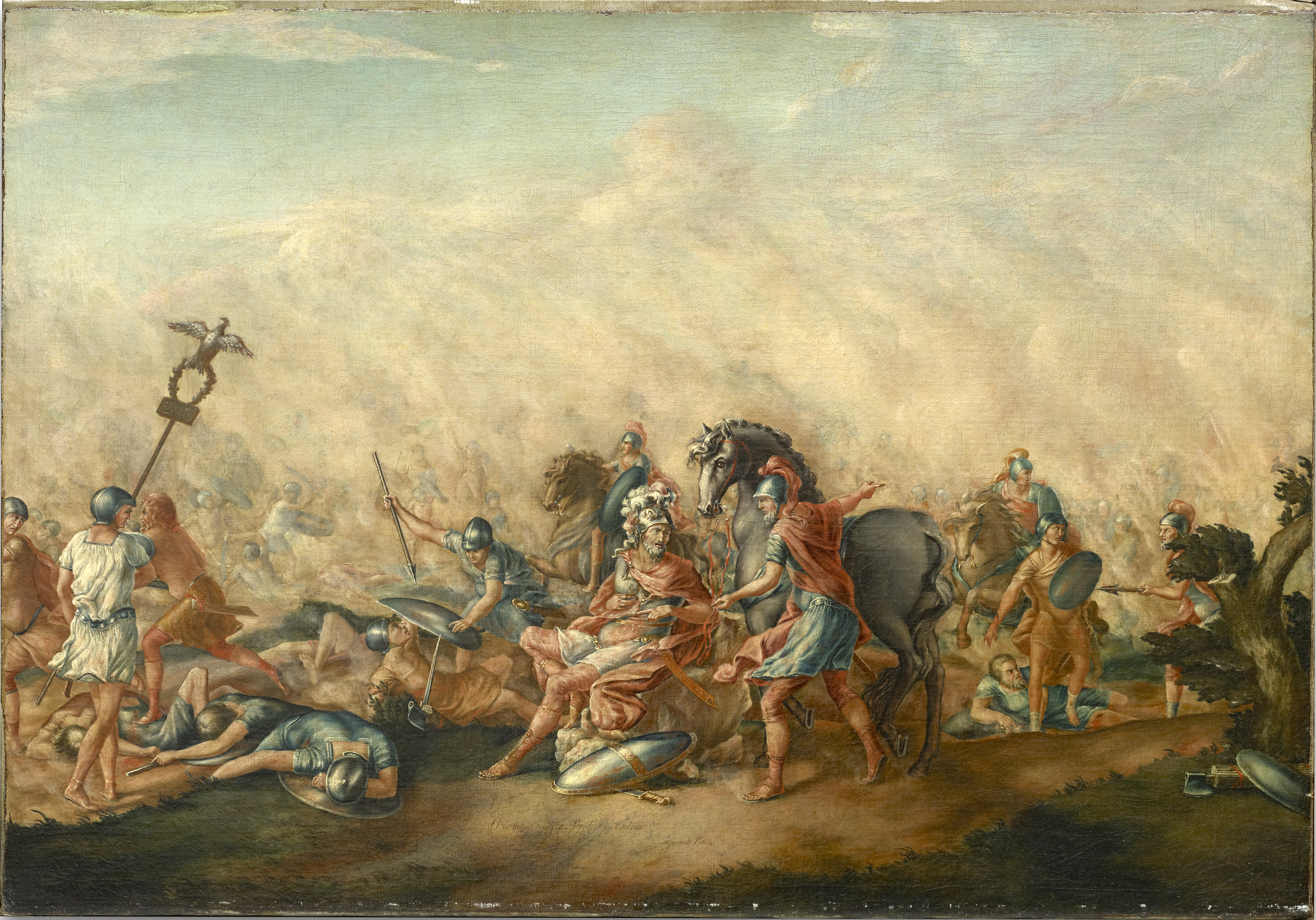
- The Death of Paulus Aemilius at the Battle of Cannae by John Trumbull

Roman consul
- In office 15 March 216 BC – 2 August 216 BC Serving with Gaius Terentius Varro
- Preceded by: Gnaeus Servilius Geminus; Marcus Atilius Regulus
- Succeeded by: Gaius Terentius Varro (remaining term)
- In office 15 March 219 BC – 14 March 218 BC Serving with Marcus Livius Salinator
- Preceded by: Gaius Lutatius Catulus; Lucius Veturius Philo
- Succeeded by: Publius Cornelius Scipio; Tiberius Sempronius Longus

Personal details
- Died: 2 August 216 BC Cannae, Roman Republic
- Cause of death: Killed in action (Arrow)
- Children: Lucius Aemilius Paullus Macedonicus; Aemilia Prima; Aemilia Secunda; Aemilia Tertia

Military service
- Allegiance: Roman Republic
- Battles/wars: Second Illyrian War; Second Punic War; Battle of Cannae †

Lucius Aemilius Paullus (died 2 August 216 BC), also spelled Paulus, was a consul of the Roman Republic twice, in 219 and 216 BC. He is primarily remembered for being one of the commanders of the Roman army at the Battle of Cannae, and for his death in the same battle.

== Biography ==
Lucius Aemilius Paullus was the son of Marcus Aemilius Paullus, the consul of 255 BC. Paullus shared his first consulship with Marcus Livius Salinator. During this year, he defeated Demetrius of Pharos in the Second Illyrian War, and forced him to flee to the court of Philip V of Macedon. On his return to Rome, he was awarded a triumph. He was subsequently charged, along with his colleague, with unfairly dividing the spoils, although he was acquitted.

During the Second Punic War, Paullus was made consul a second time and served with Gaius Terentius Varro. He shared the command of the army with Varro at the Battle of Cannae. Varro led out the troops against the advice of Paullus and the battle became a crushing defeat for the Romans. Paullus died in the battle, while Varro managed to escape.

In Silius Italicus' epic poem Punica, Paullus is described as killing the Carthaginian commander Viriathus prior to his own death.

Paullus was the father of Lucius Aemilius Paullus Macedonicus. His daughter, Aemilia Tertia, married Scipio Africanus, the Roman commander who defeated Hannibal. He was the grandfather of Publius Cornelius Scipio Aemilianus, the Roman commander who destroyed Carthage.

== See also ==
- Scipio-Paullus-Gracchus family tree

== Notes ==
Political offices
Preceded by Gaius Lutatius Catulus; Lucius Veturius Philo	Roman consul (1st term); 15 March 219 BC – 14 March 218 BC; With: Marcus Livius Salinator	Succeeded by Publius Cornelius Scipio; Tiberius Sempronius Longus
Preceded by Gnaeus Servilius Geminus; Marcus Atilius Regulus	Roman consul (2nd term); 15 March – 2 August 216 BC; With: Gaius Terentius Varro	Succeeded by Gaius Terentius Varro (remaining term)
