= Gaius Terentius Varro =

Roman general and politician

Roman Consul
- Preceded by: Gnaeus Servilius Geminus and Marcus Atilius Regulus (suffect)
- Succeeded by: Tiberius Sempronius Gracchus and Lucius Postumius Albinus
- In office 216 – 215 BCE

Military service
- Allegiance: Roman Republic
- Battles/wars: Second Punic War: Battle of Cannae

Gaius Terentius Varro (fl. 218-200 BCE) was a Roman politician and general active during the Second Punic War. A plebeian son of a butcher, he was a populist politician who was elected consul for the year 216 BCE. While holding that office, he was decisively defeated by Hannibal at the Battle of Cannae.

== Early years ==
Varro was a member of a plebeian family, the gens Terentia, and the first man of note in his family. His father was reportedly a butcher who had "employed his son in the menial tasks associated with that profession." Despite this low birth, on his father's death he used the inheritance to embark on a public career, making his name by prosecuting those of higher status and progressing through the various magistracies of the cursus honorum, holding the quaestorship and both the plebeian and curule aedileships. When discussing the provenance of his cognomen, Servius suggests that this Varro served in the First Illyrian War. His first time in office for which details survive was the praetorship of 218 BCE, during which he was perhaps posted in Sardinia.

In 217 BCE, having completed his praetorship, Varro was one of the few senators to support the elevation of Marcus Minucius Rufus to the dictatorship, apparently more because of the popular support of the plebeians that could be won by doing so than from any personal conviction. Not only was Varro successful in appointing Minucius co-dictator, but he was also elected consul for the year 216 BCE.

== Consulship ==
Varro and his colleague, Lucius Aemilius Paullus, assumed the consulship two years after the outbreak of the Second Punic War and the year after the dictator Quintus Fabius Maximus Verrucosus had earned the epithet cunctator (delayer) by refusing to engage Hannibal's army in pitched battle. Varro and Paullus, however, took the rare step of combining the two consular armies, which each would normally lead separately, into an 85,000-strong force to face Hannibal. As was customary in such situations, the two consuls took charge of the force on alternating days.

The two armies met at Cannae where the inexperienced Varro, using his day in command, pressed Paullus to attack while ordering a short battle line. Hannibal enveloped the Roman force and inflicted huge losses. Paullus was killed in the battle while Varro escaped to Venusia with around 4,500 surviving troops. On receiving word that larger Roman forces were at Canusium, he marched the survivors to join them, creating a force of roughly equal size to a standard consular army.

Varro was recalled to a Rome overrun by a state of panic. On arrival, he was greeted by a crowd who thanked him for not "despairing of the state" and taking his own life, thereby visibly choosing to fight on. While there, he facilitated the appointment of Marcus Junius Pera as dictator to settle the immediate disaster. Varro then returned to the command of his troops, taking up positions at Apulia.

Later in the year, he was again recalled to Rome to appoint Marcus Fabius Buteo as a second dictator, specifically for the purpose of promoting senators to replace those killed at Cannae.

== 215 to 207 BCE ==
Varro was prorogued in his position for the year 215 BCE, maintaining command of the force he had consolidated at Apulia, before being sent to Picenum to levy new soldiers and guard the region.

Varro, along with all the other generals still serving around Italy, was prorogued again for the year 214 BCE. He received one of the 18 legions enrolled that year to carry out his duties. He was prorogued again and kept the legion in Picenum for the next year.

After leaving Picenum, Varro was next recorded as being a Propraetor, a citizen imbued with the authority of a praetor, charged with subduing a potential rebellion in the Etrurian town of Arretium. After securing 120 hostages from the town, Varro informed the Roman senate that the unrest was still not quelled. He was sent back with a legion to garrison Arretium. He stayed in his command of Etruria for the year 207 BCE, receiving a second legion from the Senate.

== Later life ==
Varro does not feature for the remainder of the Second Punic War, although he would later hold two roles in the year 200 BCE.

For the first role, Varro was part of a three-man diplomatic legation to North Africa, tasked with visiting Carthage, and senior Numidians. The ambassadors were instructed to inform Carthage that, despite the conclusion of the war in 201 BCE, the general Hamilcar was continuing operations in Gaul and that Romans who had deserted to Carthage had not been repatriated. Furthermore, they took gifts and congratulations to Masinissa, whose alliance with Rome had proved pivotal at the Battle of Zama, on his becoming King of Numidia.

For the second role, Varro also returned to Venusia, serving as one of the three triumviri coloniae ducendae, charged with increasing the local population by adding new colonists after the town's losses during the Second Punic War. It has been suggested he also served as a minter of coins down to the year 197 BCE.

Political offices
Preceded by Gnaeus Servilius Geminus; Marcus Atilius Regulus	Roman consul 216 BC; With: Lucius Aemilius Paullus	Succeeded by Tiberius Sempronius Gracchus; Lucius Postumius Albinus
