= Gnaeus Servilius Geminus =

Roman consul 217 BC

Geminus' campaigns, 217 BC

Gnaeus Servilius Geminus (died August 2, 216 BC) was a Roman consul, serving as both general and admiral of Roman forces, during the Second Punic War.

The son of Publius Servilius Geminus, Gnaeus Geminus was elected as consul in early 217 BC. By March of that year, Geminus began directing military operations against the Carthaginian General Hannibal around Ariminum. Following the death of the consul Gaius Flaminius at the Battle of Lake Trasimene (Trasimeno) in April (as well as the rise to power of dictator Fabius Maximus the following month), Geminus assumed command of the Roman fleet overseeing coastal defense and battles against Sardinia, Corsica and the North African coast.

In November, Geminus resumed command of Roman land forces and, having been elected proconsul in early 216, became involved in skirmishes with approaching Carthaginian forces under Hannibal from March until May, before he was killed while in command of the center of the Roman line during the Battle of Cannae on August 2, 216 BC. According to the epic poem Punica by Silius Italicus, Geminus became fatigued in the battle and was finished by Carthaginian captain Viriathus.

== See also ==
- Servilia (gens)

Preceded by Publius Cornelius Scipio and Tiberius Sempronius Longus	Consul of the Roman Republic with Gaius Flaminius; 217 BC	Succeeded by Gaius Terentius Varro and Lucius Aemilius Paullus
