= Marcus Minucius Rufus =

Roman consul and magister equitum (died 216 BC)

Marcus Minucius Rufus (died August 2, 216 BC) was a Roman consul in 221 BC. He was also Magister Equitum during the dictatorship of Quintus Fabius Maximus Verrucosus known as Cunctator.

He was a political enemy of Fabius Maximus. He was against his delaying defensive strategy during the Second Punic War. While the Carthaginians had been busy at Geronium, Fabius had left Minucius in charge of the Roman army with instructions to follow the "Fabian strategy" and journeyed to Rome to observe some religious duties. Minucius, who had always advocated a more forward strategy against Hannibal, moved down from the hills after a few days and set up a new camp in the plain of Larinum to the north of Geronium. The Romans then began harassing the Carthaginian foragers from their new camp as Minucius sought to provoke Hannibal into battle. Hannibal in response moved near the Roman camp from Geronium with two thirds of his army, built a temporary camp and occupied a hill overlooking the Roman camp with 2,000 Numidian spearmen. The mobility of the Carthaginians was restricted at this time as their cavalry horses were being rested. This had also deprived Hannibal of his best weapon against the Romans, a fact which would come into play soon.

Minucius promptly attacked and drove back the spearmen posted on the hill, and then moved his camp to the top of the captured hill. The stage was set for a confrontation, with the initiative resting with Minucius. The Roman commander, for all his rashness, handled the situation with skill and shrewdness to manipulate the events to his advantage. After that he was named co-commander to Fabius. However Minucius finally accepted his commands after Fabius saved his life during Hannibal's attack at Geronium.

Marcus Minucius Rufus was killed in the Battle of Cannae.

== Notes and references ==
Political offices
Preceded by Marcus Claudius Marcellus, and Gnaeus Cornelius Scipio Calvus	Consul of the Roman Republic; 221 BC with Publius Cornelius Scipio Asina	Succeeded by Marcus Valerius Laevinus, and Quintus Mucius Scaevola
