= Battle of Cannae =

Largest battle of the Second Punic War (216 BC)

- Part of the Second Punic War
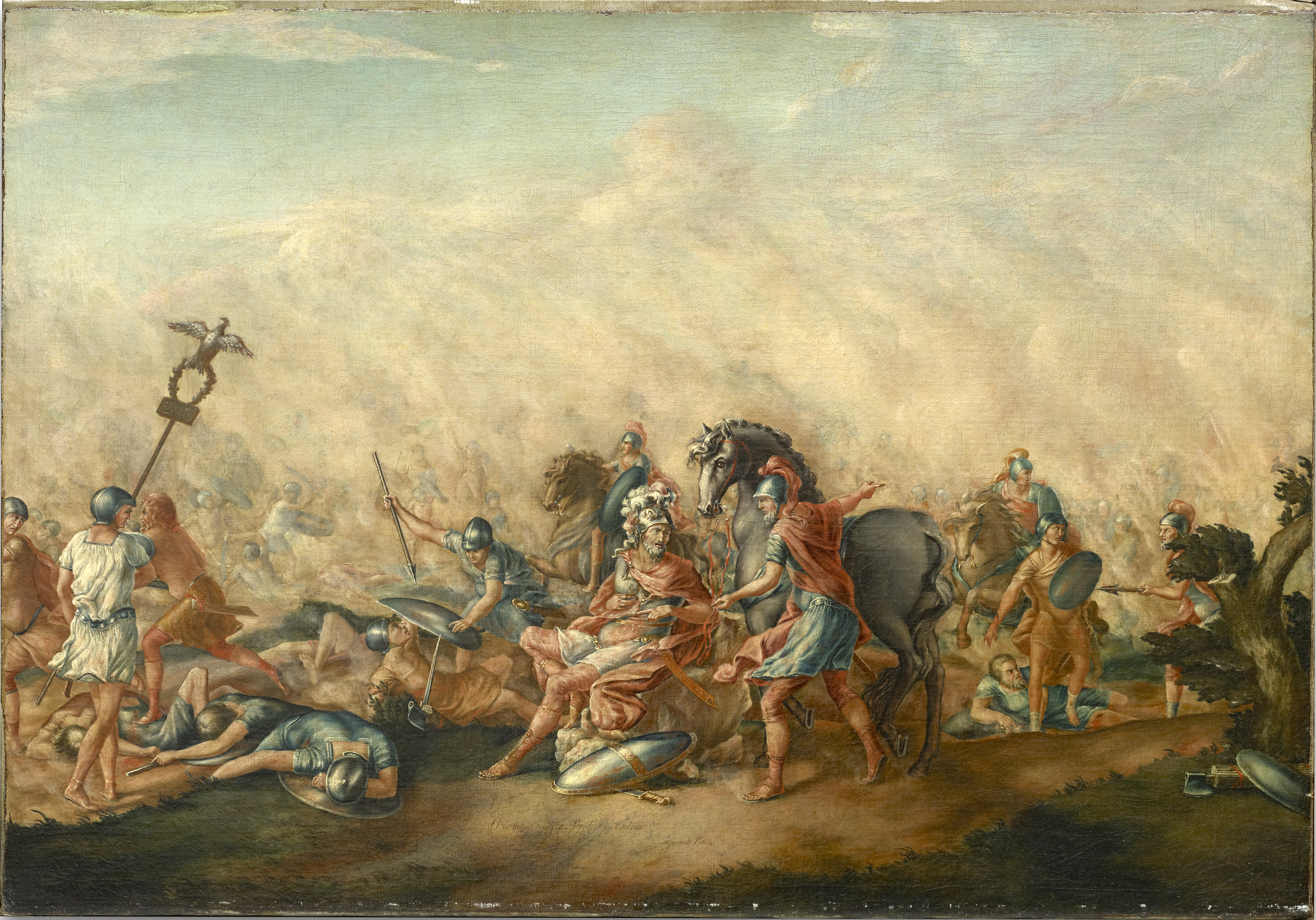
- John Trumbull, The Death of Paulus Aemilius at the Battle of Cannae (1773)
Date	2 August 216 BC
Location	Cannae, Italy 41°18′23″N 16°7′57″E
Result	Carthaginian victory (Note: Although some authors state the result was a decisive victory for Carthage, the majority of authors do not apply this label to the result.) (see § Aftermath)
Territorial changes	Carthaginian forces gain foothold in southern Italy; defection of some Roman allies including Capua to Carthage

Belligerents
Roman Republic	Carthage

Commanders and leaders
Gaius Terentius Varro; Lucius Aemilius Paullus †; Servilius Geminus †; Tuditanus; Gaius Octavius	Hannibal; Mago Barca; Gisgo; Hanno; Hasdrubal; Maharbal

Strength
Total: 86,400: 15,000 light infantry; Velites; 55,000 infantry; 25,000 Romans; 30,000 allies; 6,400 cavalry; 2,400 Roman cavalry; 4,000 allied cavalry; 10,000 allied garrison (Note: 10,000 allied troops were left to garrison the two Roman camps at the day of battle. These troops would later be captured after the Carthaginian victory.)	Total: 50,000: 8,000 light infantry; 6,000 skirmishers; 2,000 Balearic slingers; 32,000 infantry; 21,000 Gauls; 3,000 Hispanics; 8,000 Libyans; 10,000 cavalry; 4,000 Numidian cavalry; 2,000 Hispanic cavalry; 4,000 Gallic cavalry

Casualties and losses
67,500–80,000 Livy 48,200 killed 19,300 captured 14,000+ escaped Polybius 70,000 killed 10,000 captured 3,000 escaped	5,700–8,000 Livy 8,000 killed Polybius 5,700 killed
- Location of the battle within Italy

The Battle of Cannae (/ˈkæni, -eɪ, -aɪ/; (Note: See Traditional English pronunciation of Latin) Latin: [ˈkanːae̯]) was a key engagement of the Second Punic War between the Roman Republic and Carthage, fought on 2 August 216 BC near the ancient village of Cannae in Apulia, southeast Italy. The Carthaginians and their allies, led by Hannibal, surrounded and practically annihilated a larger Roman and Italian army under the consuls Lucius Aemilius Paullus and Gaius Terentius Varro. It is regarded as one of the greatest tactical feats in military history and one of the worst defeats in Roman history, and it cemented Hannibal's reputation as one of antiquity's greatest tacticians.

Having recovered from their losses at Trebia (218 BC) and Lake Trasimene (217 BC), the Romans decided to engage Hannibal at Cannae, with approximately 86,000 Roman and allied socii troops. They massed their heavy infantry in a deeper formation than usual, while Hannibal used the double envelopment tactic and surrounded his enemy, trapping the majority of the Roman army, who were then slaughtered. Later historians and military strategists have used Cannae as an exemplary battle of annihilation. The loss of life on the Roman side meant it was one of the most lethal single days of fighting in history; historian Adrian Goldsworthy equates the death toll at Cannae to "the massed slaughter of the British Army on the first day of the Somme offensive in 1916". Only about 15,000 Romans, most of whom were from the garrisons of the camps and had not taken part in the battle, survived. Following the defeat, Capua and several other Italian city-states defected from the Roman Republic to Carthage.

As news of this defeat reached Rome, the city was gripped in panic. Authorities resorted to extraordinary measures, which included consulting the Sibylline Books, dispatching a delegation led by Quintus Fabius Pictor to consult the Delphic oracle in Greece, and burying four people alive as a sacrifice to their gods. To raise two new legions, the authorities lowered the draft age and enlisted criminals, debtors and even slaves. Despite the extreme loss of men and equipment, and a second massive defeat later that same year at Silva Litana, the Romans refused to surrender to Hannibal. His offer to ransom survivors was brusquely refused. The Romans fought for 14 more years until they achieved victory at the Battle of Zama.

== Strategic background ==
Hannibal's route of invasion

Shortly after the start of the Second Punic War, Hannibal crossed into Italy by traversing the Pyrenees and the Alps during the summer and early autumn of 218 BC. He quickly won major victories over the Romans at Trebia and at Lake Trasimene. After these losses, the Romans appointed Quintus Fabius Maximus Verrucosus as dictator to deal with the threat.

Fabius used attrition warfare against Hannibal, cutting off his supply lines and avoiding pitched battles. These tactics proved unpopular with the Romans who, as they recovered from the shock of Hannibal's victories, began to question the wisdom of the Fabian strategy, which had given the Carthaginian army a chance to regroup. The majority of Romans were eager to see a quick conclusion to the war. It was feared that, if Hannibal continued plundering Italy unopposed, Rome's allies might defect to the Carthaginian side for self-preservation.

The battles of Trebia, Lake Trasimene and Cannae, anticlockwise, from top

Therefore, when Fabius came to the end of his term, the Senate did not renew his dictatorial powers and command was given to consuls Gnaeus Servilius Geminus and Marcus Atilius Regulus. In 216 BC, when elections resumed, Gaius Terentius Varro and Lucius Aemilius Paullus were elected as consuls, placed in command of a newly raised army of unprecedented size and directed to engage Hannibal. Polybius wrote:

The Senate determined to bring eight legions into the field, which had never been done at Rome before, each legion consisting of five thousand men besides allies. ...Most of their wars are decided by one consul and two legions, with their quota of allies; and they rarely employ all four at one time and on one service. But on this occasion, so great was the alarm and terror of what would happen, they resolved to bring not only four but eight legions into the field.

— Polybius, The Histories of Polybius

=== Estimates of Roman troop numbers ===
Rome typically employed four legions each year, each consisting of 4,000 foot soldiers and 200 cavalry. Per contemporary Roman sources, for the first time ever the Senate introduced eight legions, each consisting of 5,000 foot soldiers and 300 cavalry, with allied troops numbering the same number of foot soldiers but 900 cavalry per legion—more than triple the legion numbers. Eight legions—some 40,000 Roman soldiers and an estimated 2,400 cavalry—formed the core of this massive new army. Livy quotes one source stating the Romans added only 10,000 men to their usual army.

== Roman command ==
The two consuls were each assigned two of the four legions to command, unusually employing all four legions at once on the same assignment. However, the Senate feared a real threat, and deployed not just four legions to the field but all eight, including allies. Ordinarily, each of the two consuls would command his own portion of the army, but since the two armies were combined into one, Roman law required them to alternate their command on a daily basis.

The traditional account puts Varro in command on the day of the battle, and much of the blame for the defeat has been laid on his shoulders. His low social origins seem to be exaggerated in the sources, and Varro may have been made a scapegoat by the aristocratic establishment. He lacked the powerful descendants that Paullus had, descendants who were willing and able to protect his reputation—most notably his grandson Scipio Aemilianus, the patron of Polybius, one of the main sources of this history.

== Prelude ==
In the spring of 216 BC, Hannibal took the initiative and seized the large supply depot at Cannae, in the Apulian plain, placing himself between the Romans and their crucial source of supply. As Polybius noted, the capture of Cannae "caused great commotion in the Roman army; for it was not only the loss of the place and the stores in it that distressed them, but the fact that it commanded the surrounding district". The consuls, resolving to confront Hannibal, marched southward in search of him. After two days' march, they found him on the left bank of the river Aufidus, and encamped 8 km (5 mi) away.

Varro, in command on the first day, is presented by contemporary sources as a man of reckless nature and hubris, who was determined to defeat Hannibal. As the Romans approached Cannae, some of Hannibal's light infantry and cavalry ambushed them. Varro repelled the attack and continued slowly on his way to Cannae. This victory, though essentially a mere skirmish with no lasting strategic value, greatly bolstered the confidence of the Roman army, perhaps leading to overconfidence on Varro's part.

Paullus was opposed to the engagement as it was taking shape. Unlike Varro, he was prudent and cautious, and he believed it was foolish to fight on open ground, despite the Romans' numerical strength. This was especially true since Hannibal held the advantage in cavalry, in both quality and quantity. Despite these misgivings, Paullus thought it unwise to withdraw the army after the initial success, and camped two-thirds of the army east of the river Aufidus, sending the remainder to fortify a position on the opposite side, 2 km (1.2 mi) away from the main camp. The purpose of this second camp was to cover the foraging parties from the main camp and harass those of the enemy.

Camps and skirmishes at Cannae, 216 BC

The two armies stayed in their respective locations for two days. During the second day (August 1) Hannibal, aware that Varro would be in command the following day, left his camp and offered battle, but Paullus refused. When his request was rejected, Hannibal, recognizing the importance of water from the Aufidus to the Roman troops, sent his cavalry to the smaller Roman camp to harass water-bearing soldiers that were found outside the camp fortifications. According to Polybius, Hannibal's cavalry boldly rode up to the edge of the Roman encampment, causing havoc and thoroughly disrupting the supply of water to the Roman camp.

On the morning of the battle, as the forces drew up, a Carthaginian officer named Gisgo reportedly remarked to Hannibal that the size of the Roman army was astonishing. "There is one thing, Gisgo, yet more astonishing", Hannibal coolly replied, "which you take no notice of." He then explained, "In all those great numbers before us, there is not one man called Gisgo", provoking laughter that spread through the Carthaginian ranks.

Appian and Livy say Hannibal sent a small contingent of 500–600 mercenaries to pretend to desert to the Roman side. Those men, Celtiberians according to Appian and Numidians according to Livy, handed their weapons to the Romans as a sign of good will while retaining hidden short swords in their clothes. Once the battle started, following Hannibal's plans, the mercenaries attacked, stealing weapons and shields from their victims and causing chaos and confusion in the Roman camp. However, the veracity of this part is disputed.

== Date ==
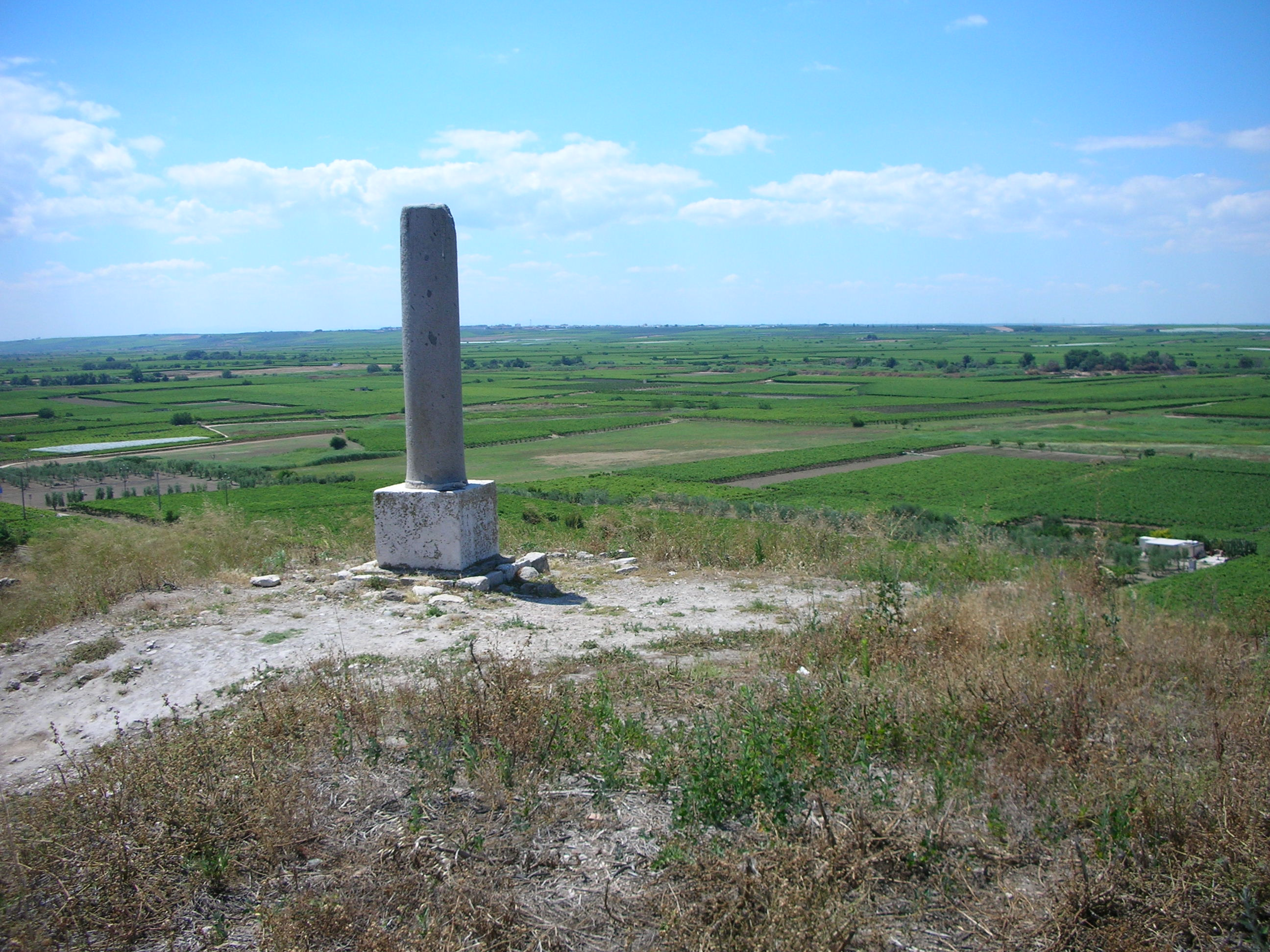
A modern monument near the site of the Battle of Cannae

Ancient historians rarely provide the precise dates for the events they describe. For example, Livy provides no explicit dates for any of the battles of the Second Punic War. Macrobius, citing the Roman annalist Quintus Claudius Quadrigarius, states the battle was fought ante diem iiii nones Sextilis, or 2 August.

The months of the pre-Julian Roman calendar are known not to correspond to its namesake Julian day. For example, Livy records a lunar eclipse in 168 BC as occurring on 4 September, when astronomical calculations show it happened on Julian day 21 June of that year. This discrepancy arose from the failure of the pontifices to properly perform intercalations, either by accident or for political advantage. A review of the evidence led P. S. Derow to identify the equivalent Julian date as 1 July 216 BC. Other authorities have suggested other Julian dates.

== Armies ==
Figures for troops involved in ancient battles are often unreliable, and Cannae is no exception. They should be treated with caution, especially those for the Carthaginian side. The Carthaginian army was a combination of warriors from numerous regions, and may have numbered between 40,000 and 50,000. Their infantry comprised an estimated 8,000 Libyans, 5,500 Gaetulian, 16,000 Gauls, mainly Boii and Insubres (8,000 were left at camp the day of battle) and 8,000 of several tribes of Hispania, including Iberians, Celtiberians and Lusitanians.

Hannibal's cavalry also came from diverse backgrounds. He commanded 4,000 Numidian, 2,000 Iberian peninsular, 4,000 Gallic and 450 Libyan-Phoenician cavalry. Hannibal had an auxiliary skirmisher contingent consisting of 1,000–2,000 Balearic slingers and 6,000 mixed-nationality javelinmen, possibly including Lusitanians among them. The uniting factor for the Carthaginian army was the personal tie each group had with Hannibal.

== Equipment ==
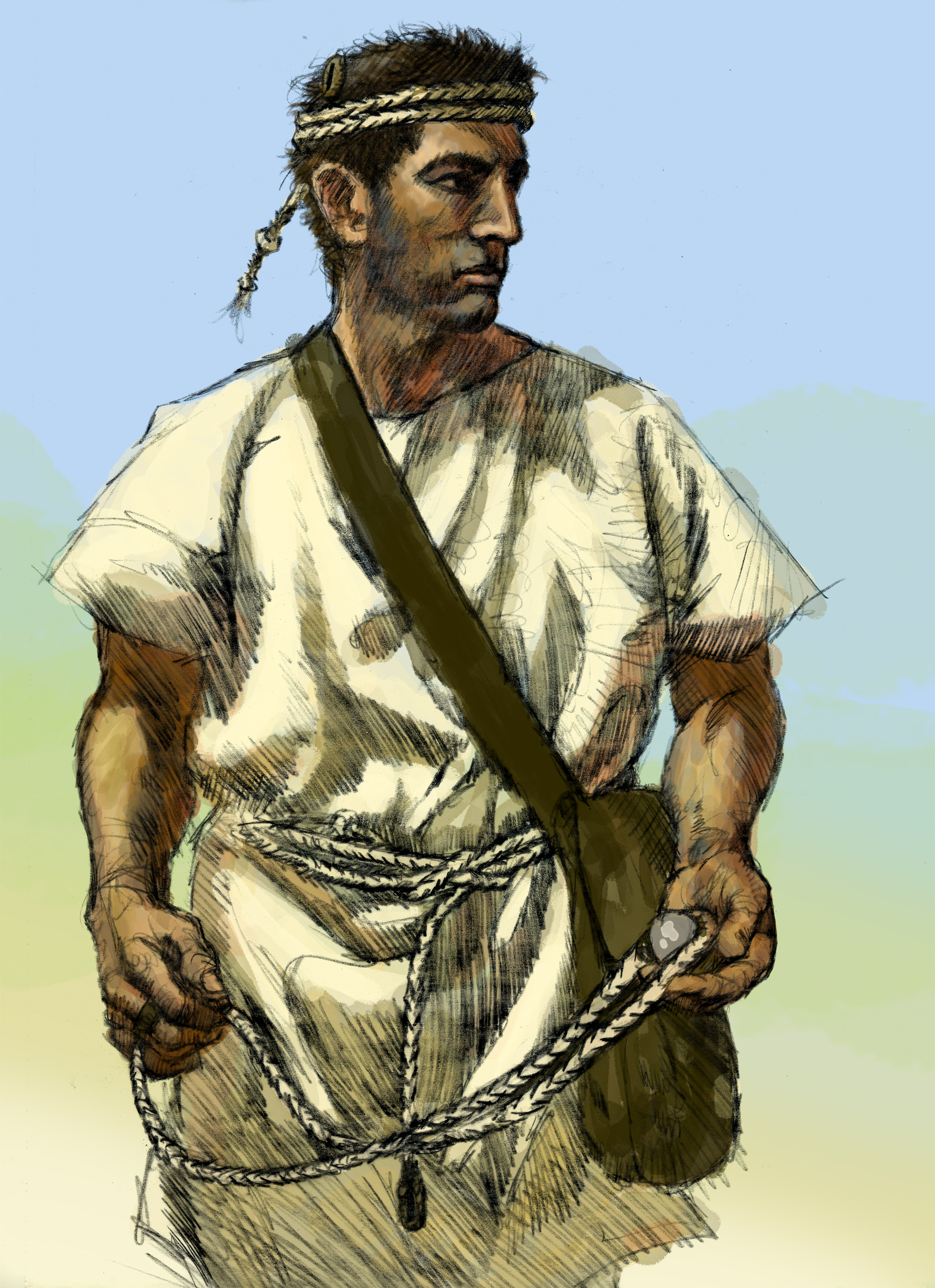
A modern interpretation of a slinger from the Balearic Islands, famous for the skill of their slingers

Rome's forces used typical Roman equipment including pila (heavy javelins) and hastae (thrusting spears) as weapons as well as traditional bronze helmets, bodyshields and body armor. In contrast, the Carthaginian army used a variety of equipment. The Iberians fought with falcatas, while Celtiberians and Lusitanians used straight gladii, as well as javelins and various types of spears. For defense, warriors from Hispania carried large oval shields and often wore a crested helmet made of animal sinews. Most Gallic foot warriors likely had no protection other than large shields, and the typical Gallic weapon was a long slashing sword.

The Numidian cavalry were very lightly equipped, lacking saddles and bridles for their horses, and wearing no armor but carrying small shields, javelins and possibly a knife or a longer blade. In contrast, the heavier Iberian peninsular cavalry carried round shields, swords, javelins and thrusting spears. The similarly heavy Gallic cavalry added the four-horned saddle, with the wealthier ones being clad in mail, a Gallic invention.

Skirmishers acting as light infantry carried either slings or javelins. The Balearic slingers, who were famous for their accuracy, carried short, medium and long slings used to cast stones or bullets. They may have carried a small shield or simple leather pelt on their arms, but this is uncertain. Hannibal himself, like many Roman officers on the opposing side, might have been wearing a bronze musculata and carrying a falcata as his personal sidearm.

The equipment of the Libyan line infantry has been much debated. Duncan Head has argued in favor of short stabbing spears. Polybius states that the Libyans fought with equipment taken from previously defeated Romans. It is unclear whether he meant only shields and armor or offensive weapons as well, though a general reading suggests he meant the whole panoply of arms and armor, and even tactical organization. Apart from his description of the battle itself, when later discussing the subject of the Roman legion versus the Greek phalanx, Polybius says that "...against Hannibal, the defeats they suffered had nothing to do with weapons or formations" because "Hannibal himself... discarded the equipment with which he had started out [and] armed his troops with Roman weapons".

Gregory Daly is inclined to the view that Libyan infantry would have copied the Iberian use of the sword during their fighting there and so were armed similarly to the Romans. Peter Connolly has argued that they were armed as a pike phalanx. This has been disputed by Head, because Plutarch states they carried spears shorter than the Roman triarii and by Daly because they could not have carried an unwieldy pike at the same time as a heavy Roman-style shield.

== Tactical deployment ==
The conventional deployment for armies of the time was placement of infantry in the center, with the cavalry in two flanking wings. The Romans followed this convention fairly closely, but chose extra depth rather than breadth for the infantry in hopes of breaking quickly through the center of Hannibal's line. Varro knew how the Roman infantry had managed to penetrate Hannibal's center at Trebia, and he planned to recreate this on an even greater scale. The principes were stationed immediately behind the hastati, ready to push forward at first contact to ensure the Romans presented a unified front. As Polybius wrote, "the maniples were nearer each other, or the intervals were decreased... and the maniples showed more depth than front".

Even though they outnumbered the Carthaginians, this depth-oriented deployment meant that the Roman lines had a front of roughly equal size to their numerically inferior opponents. The typical style of Roman warfare was to continuously push with the infantry in the center and attempt to overpower the enemy line. Despite what these tactics might suggest, the center was not commanded by either of the two consuls, but by Geminus Servilius. The consuls commanded the two wings, Terentius Varro the left and Aemilius Paullus the right. Hannibal understood that the Romans fought their battles like this, and he took his outnumbered army and strategically placed them around the enemy to win a tactical victory.

The initial deployment and Roman attack (in red)

Hannibal had deployed his forces based on the particular fighting qualities of each unit, taking into consideration both their strengths and weaknesses. This aspect of Hannibal's leadership was highlighted in the use of a Spanish unit, the Balearic slingers, whom he placed behind the infantry to hurl their ranged missiles into the masses of Roman troops. He placed his Iberians, Celtiberians and Gauls in the middle, alternating the ethnic composition between Hispanics and Gauls across the front line, with himself at the front and center alongside his brother Mago.

Roman sources claim their placement was chosen for being the most expendable and unreliable troops, but modern reflections believe those forces were actually selected for their battle-hardening to carry the weight of the Punic side, as they would be tasked with the controlled retreat that ultimately made Hannibal's pincer movement possible. Meanwhile, infantry from Punic Africa was on the wings at the very edge of his infantry line. This infantry would remain cohesive and attack the Roman flanks.

Hasdrubal led the Hispanic and Gallic cavalry on the left (south near the river Aufidus) of the Carthaginian army. By placing the flank of his army on the Aufidus, Hannibal prevented this flank from being overlapped by the more numerous Romans. Hasdrubal was given 6,000–7,000 cavalry, and Hanno had 3,000–4,000 Numidians on the right.

Livy's account of initial positions of Roman and Carthaginian armies

Hannibal intended that his cavalry, comprising mainly medium Hispanic cavalry and Numidian light horse, and positioned on the flanks, would defeat the weaker Roman cavalry and swing around to attack the Roman infantry from the rear as it pressed upon Hannibal's weakened center. His veteran African troops would then press in from the flanks at the crucial moment, and encircle the overextended Romans.

The Romans were in front of the hill leading to Cannae and hemmed in on their right flank by the river Aufidus, so that their left flank was the only viable means of retreat. In addition, the Carthaginian forces had maneuvered so that the Romans would face east. Not only would the morning sun shine low into the Romans' eyes, but the southeasterly winds would blow sand and dust into their faces as they approached the battlefield. Hannibal's deployment of his army, based on his perception of the terrain and understanding of the capabilities of his troops, proved decisive.

== Battle ==
The encirclement and destruction of the Roman army

As the armies advanced on one another, Hannibal gradually extended the center of his line, as Polybius described: "After thus drawing up his whole army in a straight line, he took the central companies of Hispanics and Celts and advanced with them, keeping the rest of them in contact with these companies, but gradually falling off, so as to produce a crescent-shaped formation, the line of the flanking companies growing thinner as it was prolonged, his object being to employ the Africans as a reserve force and to begin the action with the Hispanics and Celts." Polybius described the weak Carthaginian center as deployed in a crescent, curving out toward the Romans in the middle with the African troops on their flanks in echelon formation.

It is believed that the purpose of this formation was to break the forward momentum of the Roman infantry, and delay its advance before other developments allowed Hannibal to deploy his African infantry most effectively. While the majority of historians feel that Hannibal's action was deliberate, some have called this account fanciful, and claim that the actions of the day represent either the natural curvature that occurs when a broad front of infantry marches forward, or the bending back of the Carthaginian center from the shock action of meeting the heavily massed Roman center.

The battle began with a fierce cavalry engagement on the flanks. Polybius described many of the Hispanic and Celtic horsemen facing the Romans dismounting due to the lack of space to fight on horseback, and called the struggle "barbaric" in the sense of its utter brutality. When the Carthaginian cavalry got the upper hand, they cut down their Roman opponents without giving quarter. On the other flank the Numidians engaged in a way that merely kept the Roman allied cavalry occupied. Hasdrubal kept his victorious Hispanic and Gallic cavalry under control and did not chase the retreating Roman right wing. Instead, he led them to the other side of the field to attack the socii cavalry still fighting the Numidians. Assailed from both sides, the allied cavalry broke before Hasdrubal could charge into contact and the Numidians pursued them off the field.

While the Carthaginian cavalry were in the process of defeating the Roman horsemen, the masses of infantry on both sides advanced towards each other in the center of the field. The wind from the east blew dust in the Romans' faces and obscured their vision. While the wind was not a major factor, the dust that both armies created would have been potentially debilitating to sight. Although it made seeing difficult, troops would still have been able to see others in the vicinity.

The dust was not the only psychological factor involved in battle. Because of the somewhat distant battle location, both sides were forced to fight on little sleep. Another Roman disadvantage was thirst, caused by Hannibal's attack on the Roman encampment during the previous day. Furthermore, the massive number of troops would have led to an overwhelming amount of background noise. All of these psychological factors made battle especially difficult for the infantrymen.

Livy's account of the Battle of Cannae

The light infantry on both sides engaged in indecisive skirmishing, inflicting few casualties and quickly withdrawing through the ranks of their heavy infantry. As the Roman heavy infantry attacked, Hannibal stood with his men in the weak center and held them together in a controlled retreat. The crescent of Hispanic and Gallic troops buckled inwards as they gradually withdrew step by step. Knowing the superiority of the Roman infantry, Hannibal had instructed his infantry to withdraw deliberately, creating an even tighter envelopment around the attacking Roman forces. By doing so, he had turned the strength of the Roman infantry into a weakness. While the front ranks were gradually advancing, the bulk of the Roman troops began to lose their cohesion, as troops from the reserve lines advanced into the growing gaps.

Soon they were compacted together so closely that they had little space to wield their weapons. In pressing so far forward in their desire to destroy the retreating and seemingly collapsing line of Hispanic and Gallic troops, the Romans had ignored (possibly due to the dust) the African troops that stood uncommitted on the projecting ends of this now-reversed crescent.

This also gave the Carthaginian cavalry time to drive the Roman cavalry off on both flanks and attack the Roman center in the rear. The Roman infantry, now stripped of protection on both its flanks, formed a wedge that drove deeper and deeper into the Carthaginian semicircle, driving itself into an alley formed by the African infantry on the wings. At this decisive point, Hannibal ordered his African infantry to turn inwards and advance against the Roman flanks, creating an encirclement in one of the earliest known examples of a pincer movement.

When the Carthaginian cavalry attacked the Romans in the rear and the African flanking echelons assailed them on their right and left, the advance of the Roman infantry was brought to an abrupt halt. The Romans were henceforth enclosed in a pocket with no means of escape. The Carthaginians created a wall and began to systematically massacre them. Polybius wrote: "as their outer ranks were continually cut down, and the survivors forced to pull back and huddle together, they were finally all killed where they stood."

Roman survivors escape from Cannae

As Livy described, "So many thousands of Romans were dying... Some, whom their wounds, pinched by the morning cold, had roused, as they were rising up, covered with blood, from the midst of the heaps of slain, were overpowered by the enemy. Some were found with their heads plunged into the earth, which they had excavated; having thus, as it appeared, made pits for themselves, and having suffocated themselves." Victor Davis Hanson claims that nearly six hundred legionaries were slaughtered each minute until darkness brought an end to the bloodletting.

Roman forces regroup after the defeat at Cannae

A few Romans managed to escape the disaster. Both Livy and Polybius agree that the consul Varro managed to escape with 70 horsemen to Venusia. However, both authorities differ about how many more escaped. Polybius states "perhaps 3,000" infantry and 300 allied horsemen escaped, but his surviving narrative furnishes no further details. Livy is more informative. He singles out a group of 600 men under Publius Sempronius Tuditanus who fought their way out of the smaller encampment to the larger one, then from there to Canusium. The tribune Gaius Octavius was noted to be fighting along with Tuditanus in that breakout. Another group from the larger camp, numbering 4,000 infantry and 200 horsemen, also made their way to Canusium "some marching in column, others, which was no more dangerous, making their way over the countryside." Livy mentions that Varro reported to the Senate that he assembled a force of 10,000 survivors, "bits and pieces from various units, and nothing like a coherent force".

== Casualties ==
=== Roman ===
Polybius writes that of the Roman and allied infantry, 70,000 were killed, 10,000 captured, and "perhaps" 3,000 survived. He also reports that of the 6,000 Roman and allied cavalry, only 370 survived.

Livy wrote, "Forty-five thousand and five hundred foot, two thousand seven hundred horse, there being an equal number of citizens and allies, are said to have been slain." He also reports that 3,000 Roman and allied infantry and 1,500 Roman and allied cavalry were taken prisoner by the Carthaginians. Another 2,000 Roman fugitives were rounded up at the unfortified village of Cannae by Carthaginian cavalry commanded by Carthalo, 7,000 fell prisoner in the smaller Roman camp and 5,800 in the larger. Although Livy does not cite his source by name, it is likely to have been Quintus Fabius Pictor, a Roman historian who fought in and wrote about the Second Punic War. It is Pictor whom Livy names when reporting the casualties at the Battle of Trebia.

In addition to the consul Paullus, Livy recorded that among the dead were 2 quaestors, 29 of the 48 military tribunes, some of consular rank, including the consul of the previous year, Gnaeus Servilius Geminus, and the former magister equitum, Marcus Minucius Rufus, and 80 "senators or men who had held offices which would have given them the right to be elected to the Senate".

Later Roman and Greco-Roman historians largely follow Livy's figures. Appian gave 50,000 killed and "a great many" taken prisoner. Plutarch agreed, "50,000 Romans fell in that battle... 4,000 were taken alive in the field and 10,000 in the camps of both consuls". Quintilian: "60,000 men were slain by Hannibal at Cannae". Eutropius: "20 officers of consular and praetorian rank, 30 senators, and 300 others of noble descent, were taken or slain, as well as 40,000-foot-soldiers, and 3,500 horse".

Some modern historians, while rejecting Polybius's figure as flawed, are willing to accept Livy's figure. Other historians have come up with far lower estimates. In 1891, Cantalupi proposed Roman losses of 10,500 to 16,000. Samuels in 1990 also regarded Livy's figure as far too high, on the grounds that the cavalry would have been inadequate to prevent the Roman infantry escaping to the rear. He doubts that Hannibal even wanted a high death toll, as much of the army consisted of Italians whom Hannibal hoped to win as allies. Micheal Clodfelter also doubts the casualties of the Romans, citing the scarcity and unreliability of ancient sources, with him expressing that "are we really supposed to believe that Hannibal's 50,000 Carthaginians slaughtered 48,000–70,000 Romans on a single afternoon on the field of Cannae, even if the battle did degenerate into a massacre in its final stages?".

=== Carthaginian ===
Livy recorded Hannibal's losses at "about 8,000 of his bravest men." Polybius reports 5,700 dead: 4,000 Gauls, 1,500 Hispanics and Africans, and 200 cavalry.

== Aftermath ==
Never when the city was in safety was there so great a panic and confusion within the walls of Rome. I shall therefore shrink from the task, and not attempt to relate what in describing I must make less than the reality. The consul and his army having been lost at the Trasimenus the year before, it was not one wound upon another which was announced, but a multiplied disaster, the loss of two consular armies, together with the two consuls: and that now there was neither any Roman camp, nor general nor soldiery: that Apulia and Samnium, and now almost the whole of Italy, were in the possession of Hannibal. No other nation surely would not have been overwhelmed by such an accumulation of misfortune.

— Livy, on the Roman Senate's reaction to the defeat

Capua defects to Hannibal, 216 BC

For a brief period, the Romans were in complete disarray. Their best armies in the peninsula had been destroyed, the few remnants severely demoralized, and the only remaining consul (Varro) completely discredited. As the story goes, Rome declared a national day of mourning as there was not a single person who was not either related to or acquainted with a person who had died. The Romans became so desperate that they resorted to human sacrifice, twice burying people alive at the Forum Boarium of Rome and abandoning an oversized baby in the Adriatic Sea (perhaps one of the last instances of human sacrifices by the Romans, apart from public executions of defeated enemies dedicated to Mars).

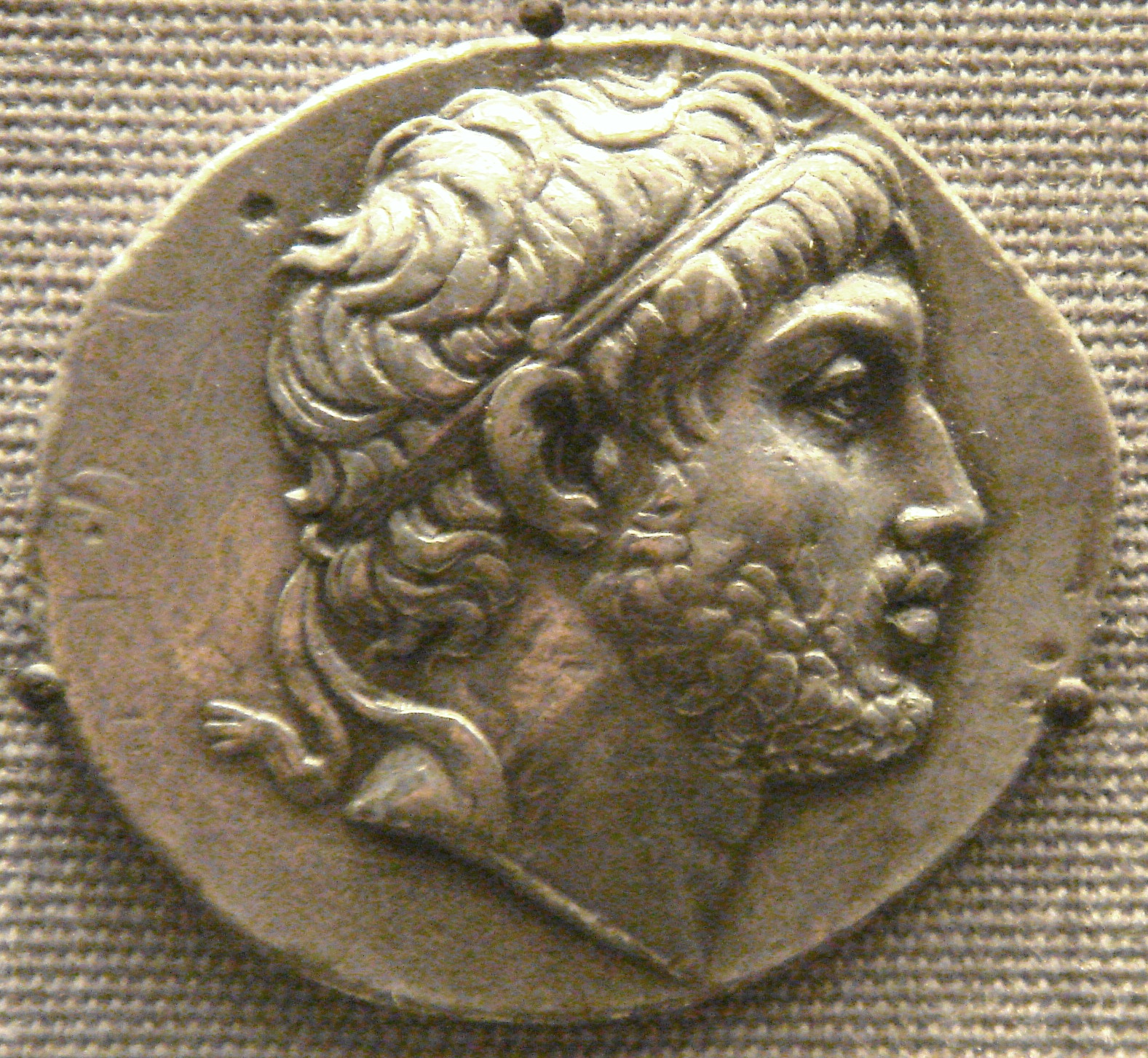
Philip V of Macedon pledged his support to Hannibal following the Carthaginian victory.

Within just three campaign seasons (20 months), Rome had lost one-fifth (150,000) of the entire population of male citizens over 17 years of age. The morale effect of this victory was such that most of southern Italy joined Hannibal's cause. After Cannae, the Hellenistic southern provinces of Arpi, Salapia, and Uzentum, including the cities of Capua and Tarentum, two of the largest city-states in Italy, and other settlements of non-Latin origin such as Herdonia, revoked their allegiance to Rome and pledged their loyalty to Hannibal.

As Livy noted, "How much more serious was the defeat of Cannae than those which preceded it, can be seen by the behavior of Rome's allies; before that fateful day, their loyalty remained unshaken, now it began to waver for the simple reason that they despaired of Roman power." Following the battle, Sicily's Greek cities rose in revolt against Roman political control. The Macedonian king, Philip V, pledged his support to Hannibal, initiating the First Macedonian War against Rome. The following year Hannibal secured an alliance with the new king Hieronymus of Syracuse, the only independent king left in Sicily.

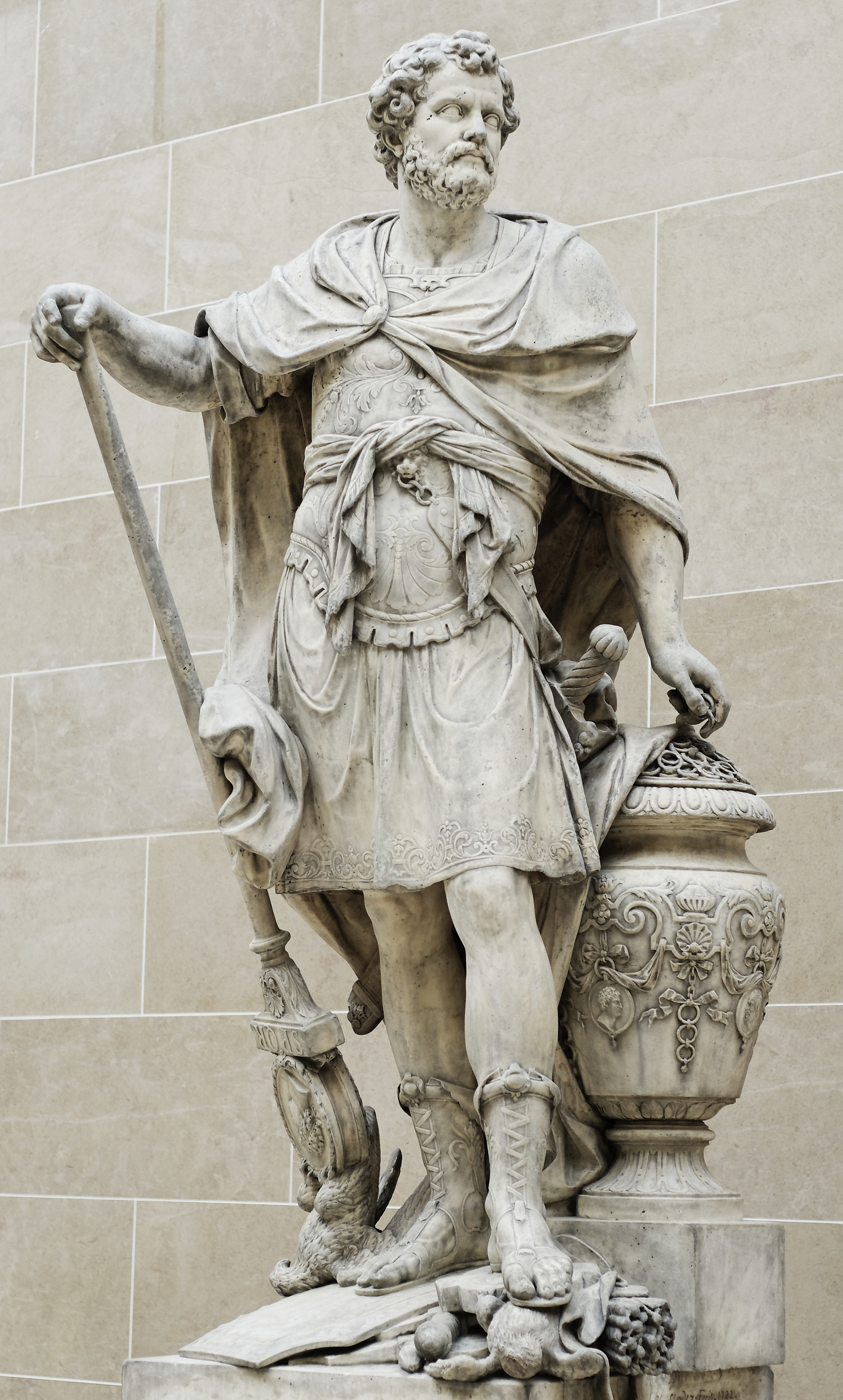
Hannibal counting the signet rings of the Roman knights killed during the battle, statue by Sébastien Slodtz, 1704, Louvre

Livy illustrates the state of Roman morale with two vivid anecdotes. The first concerns Hannibal's brother Mago, who had returned to Carthage with news of the victory. He reported to their senate that in several engagements with the Romans Hannibal had killed over 200,000 soldiers and taken 50,000 prisoner; of six commanders met in battle, two consuls and a Master of horse had been slain; and a number of Roman allies had gone over to the Carthaginians. Then Mago concluded his report by having a container of golden rings poured upon the council floor in front of the assembled senators. He explained that each ring belonged to one eques who had been slain in battle and had earned the ring through exceptional bravery. Livy notes that one unnamed authority stated the volume of jewelry amounted to three and one-half measures, only to add "it is generally and more credibly held that there was not more than one measure of them".

The second concerns Lucius Caecilius Metellus and three other military tribunes, who had taken refuge at Canusium with other Roman refugees. Demoralized at the defeat, they discussed the possibility of setting sail overseas and finding employment as mercenaries for some foreign prince. Word of this meeting reached the young Publius Cornelius Scipio who, with only a few followers, burst into the room where the discussion was underway. Holding his naked sword over the heads of the wavering men, Scipio is reported to have cried:

I swear with all the passion in my heart that I will never desert our homeland, or permit any other citizen of Rome to leave her in the lurch. If I willfully break my oath may Jupiter, Greatest and Best, bring me to a shameful death, with my house, my family, and all I possess! Swear the same oath, Caecilius! And the rest of you, swear it too. If anyone refuses, against him this sword is drawn.

Journeys of Magius Decius, Fabius Pictor, and Mago Barca following the Battle of Cannae, 216 BC

Defections of Roman allies after the defeat at Cannae

After the battle, the commander of the Numidian cavalry, Maharbal, urged Hannibal to seize the opportunity and march immediately on Rome. It is told that the latter's refusal caused Maharbal's exclamation: "Assuredly, no one man has been blessed with all God's gifts. You, Hannibal, know how to gain a victory; you do not know how to use it."

Instead, Hannibal sent a delegation led by Carthalo to negotiate a peace treaty with the Senate on moderate terms. Despite the multiple catastrophes Rome had suffered, the Senate refused to parley. Instead, they redoubled their efforts, declaring full mobilization of the male Roman population, and raised new legions, enlisting landless peasants and even slaves. So firm were these measures that the word "peace" was prohibited, mourning was limited to only 30 days, and public tears were prohibited even to women.

Hannibal had good reasons to judge the strategic situation after the battle differently from Maharbal. As the historian Hans Delbrück pointed out, due to the high numbers of killed and wounded among its ranks, the Punic army was not in a condition to mount a direct assault on Rome. It would have been a fruitless demonstration that would have nullified the psychological effect of Cannae on the Roman allies. Even if his army were at full strength, a successful siege of Rome would have required Hannibal to subdue a considerable part of the hinterland to cut the enemy's supplies and secure his own.

Even after the tremendous losses suffered at Cannae and the defection of a number of her allies, Rome still had abundant manpower to prevent this and maintain considerable forces in Iberia, Sicily, Sardinia and elsewhere, despite Hannibal's presence in Italy. Hannibal's conduct after the victories at Trasimene (217 BC) and Cannae, and the fact that he first attacked Rome only five years later in 211 BC, suggests that his strategic aim was not the destruction of his foe but to dishearten the Romans by carnage on the battlefield and to wear them down to a moderate peace agreement by stripping them of their allies.

"In fact there were many good reasons for not marching on Rome," military expert Robert O'Connell writes, "and only one good reason for going." While the scholars provide reasons not to march, a soldier, Field Marshal Bernard Montgomery, believed Maharbal was right; when a more powerful adversary is down, he must be dispatched. "Hannibal's single chance of winning the larger war was to begin marching his army towards Rome," O'Connell adds. "In the end it still would have been a long shot. But it was his only shot. Instead, Hannibal chose another route, and the war became only a matter of time."

For the remainder of the war in Italy, the Romans did not amass large forces under one command against Hannibal; they used several independent armies, still outnumbering the Punic forces in numbers of soldiers. The war in Italy still had occasional battles, but was focused on taking strongpoints and constant fighting according to the Fabian strategy. This finally forced Hannibal with his shortage of manpower to retreat to Croton from where he was called to Africa for the final battle of Zama, where the Roman victory ended the war.

== Historical significance ==
=== Effects on Roman military doctrine ===
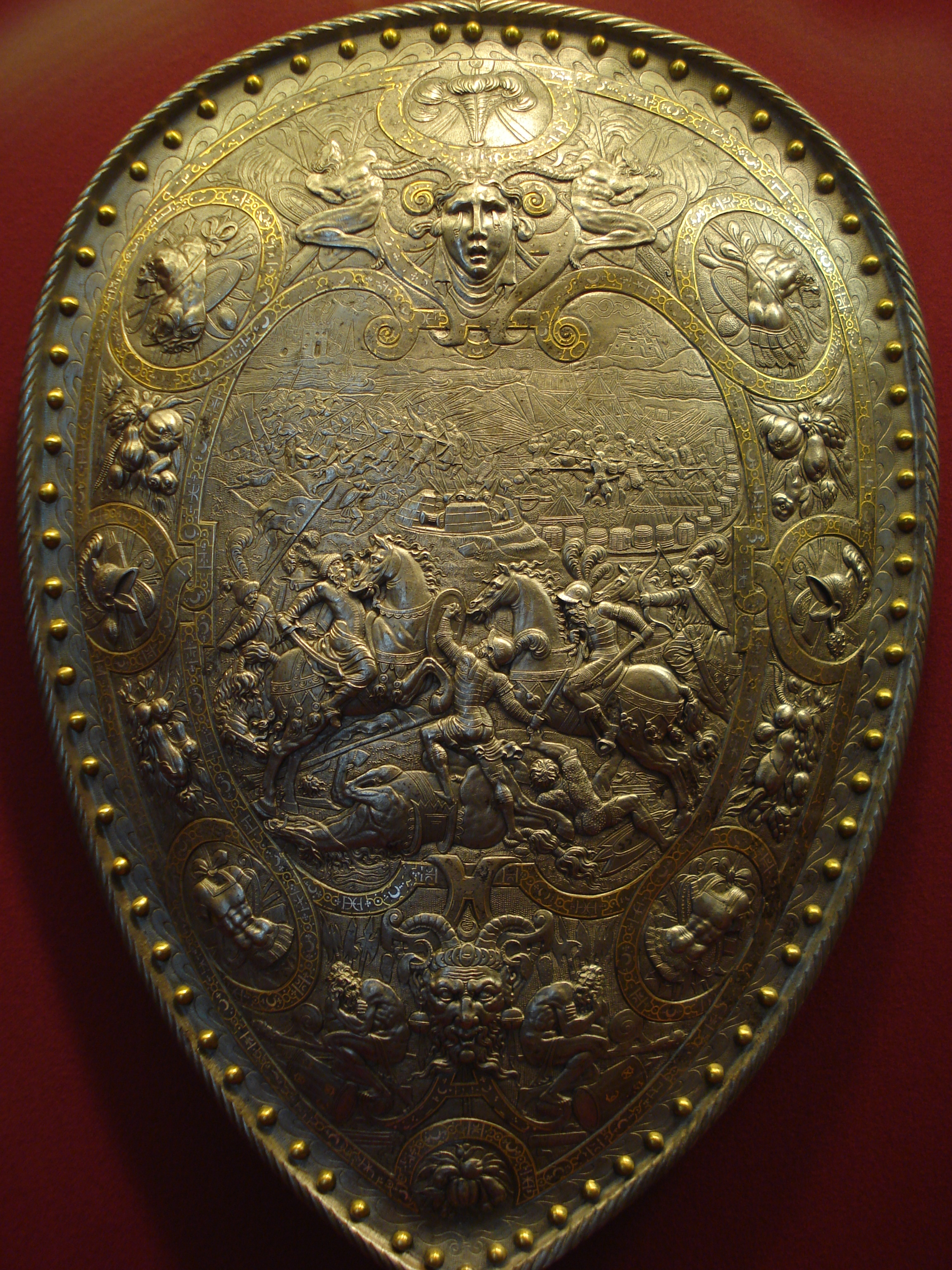
A shield of Henry II of France depicting Hannibal's victory at Cannae, an allusion to France's conflict with the Holy Roman Empire during the 16th century

Cannae played a major role in shaping the military structure and tactical organization of the Republican army. At Cannae, the Roman infantry assumed a formation similar to the Greek phalanx. This left them vulnerable to Hannibal's tactic of double envelopment since their inability to maneuver independently from the mass of the army made it impossible for them to counter the strategic encirclement used by the Carthaginian cavalry. The laws of the Roman state requiring command to alternate between the two consuls restricted strategic consistency.

In the years following Cannae, striking reforms were introduced to address these deficiencies. First, the Romans "articulated the phalanx, then divided it into columns, and finally split it up into a great number of small tactical bodies that were capable, now of closing together in a compact impenetrable union, now of changing the pattern with consummate flexibility, of separating one from the other and turning in this or that direction." For instance, at Ilipa and Zama, the principes were formed up well to the rear of the hastati—a deployment that allowed a greater degree of mobility and maneuverability. The culminating result of this change marked the transition from the traditional manipular system to the cohort under Gaius Marius, as the basic infantry unit of the Roman army.

In addition, a unified command came to be seen as a necessity. After various political experiments, Scipio Africanus was made general-in-chief of the Roman armies in Africa, and was assured this role for the duration of the war. This appointment may have violated the constitutional laws of the Roman Republic but, as Delbrück wrote, it "effected an internal transformation that increased her military potentiality enormously" while foreshadowing the decline of the Republic's political institutions. Furthermore, the battle exposed the limits of a citizen-militia army. Following Cannae, the Roman army gradually developed into a professional force.

=== Status in military history ===
Cannae is as famous for Hannibal's tactics as it is for the role it played in Roman history. Not only did Hannibal inflict a defeat on the Roman Republic in a manner unrepeated for over a century until the lesser-known Battle of Arausio, but the battle also has acquired a significant reputation in military history. As military historian Theodore Ayrault Dodge wrote:

Few battles of ancient times are more marked by ability... than the battle of Cannae. The position was such as to place every advantage on Hannibal's side. The manner in which the far from perfect Hispanic and Gallic foot was advanced in a wedge in echelon... was first held there and then withdrawn step by step, until it had reached the converse position... is a simple masterpiece of battle tactics. The advance at the proper moment of the African infantry, and its wheel right and left upon the flanks of the disordered and crowded Roman legionaries, is far beyond praise. The whole battle, from the Carthaginian standpoint, is a consummate piece of art, having no superior, few equal, examples in the history of war.

Will Durant wrote, "It was a supreme example of generalship, never bettered in history... and it set the lines of military tactics for 2,000 years".

Hannibal's double envelopment at Cannae is often viewed as one of the greatest battlefield maneuvers in history, and is cited as the first successful use of the pincer movement within the Western world to be recorded in detail.

=== Cannae model ===
Apart from being one of the greatest defeats inflicted on Roman arms, Cannae represents the archetypal battle of annihilation, a strategy that has rarely succeeded since. As Dwight D. Eisenhower, the Supreme Commander of the Allied Expeditionary Force in World War II, wrote, "Every ground commander seeks the battle of annihilation; so far as conditions permit, he tries to duplicate in modern war the classic example of Cannae". "Cannae" has become a byword for military success, and the battle is studied in military academies around the world. The notion that an entire army could be encircled and annihilated within a single stroke led to a fascination among Western generals for centuries, including Frederick the Great and Helmuth von Moltke, who attempted to create their own "Cannae".

Delbrück's seminal study of the battle influenced German military theorists, particularly Chief of the German General Staff Alfred von Schlieffen, whose "Schlieffen Plan" was inspired by Hannibal's double envelopment maneuver. Schlieffen believed that the "Cannae model" would continue to be applicable in maneuver warfare throughout the 20th century:

A battle of annihilation can be carried out today according to the same plan devised by Hannibal in long forgotten times. The enemy front is not the goal of the principal attack. The mass of the troops and the reserves should not be concentrated against the enemy front; the essential is that the flanks be crushed. The wings should not be sought at the advanced points of the front but rather along the entire depth and extension of the enemy formation. The annihilation is completed through an attack against the enemy's rear... To bring about a decisive and annihilating victory requires an attack against the front and against one or both flanks...

Schlieffen later developed his own operational doctrine in a series of articles, many of which were translated and published in a work entitled Cannae.

In 1991, General Norman Schwarzkopf Jr., commander of coalition forces in the Gulf War, cited Hannibal's triumph at Cannae as inspiration for the rapid and successful coalition operations during the conflict.

== Historical sources ==
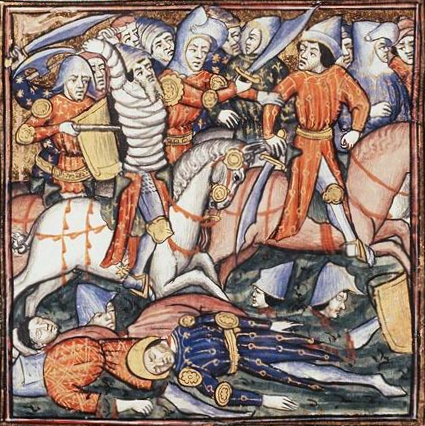
A medieval representation of the battle of Cannae

There are three main accounts of the battle, none of them contemporary. The closest is Polybius, who wrote his account 50 years after the battle. Livy wrote in the time of Augustus, and Appian later still. Appian's account describes events that have no relation with those of Livy and Polybius. Polybius portrays the battle as the nadir of Roman fortunes, perhaps to emphasise the subsequent Roman recovery—some historians contend that his casualty figures are exaggerated—"more symbolic than factual".

Livy portrays the Senate in heroic terms and assigns blame for the Roman defeat to the low-born Varro. This lifts blame from the Roman soldiers, whom Livy idealizes. Scholars tend to discount Appian's account. The verdict of Philip Sabin—"a worthless farrago"—is typical.

Although he has no connected narrative of the battle, Plutarch provides a number of details about Cannae in his Parallel Lives, specifically the essays "Fabius" and "Aemilius Paulus".

Historian Martin Samuels has questioned whether it was in fact Varro in command on the day on the grounds that Paullus may have been in command on the right. The warm reception that Varro received after the battle from the Senate was in striking contrast to the savage criticism meted out to other commanders. Samuels doubts whether Varro would have been received with such warmth had he been in command. Gregory Daly notes that, in the Roman military, the right was always the place of command. He suggests that at the Battle of Zama Hannibal claimed to have fought Paullus at Cannae and concludes that it is impossible to be sure who was in command on the day.

== Bibliography ==
=== Ancient sources ===
- Appian (1999). "Hannibalic War". Perseus Digital Library. Archived from the original on 2021-02-01.
- Livy, Ab urbe condita, translation Archived 2019-06-08 at the Wayback Machine by Cannon Roberts.
- Plutarch (1916). "Life of Fabius Maximus". Loeb Classical Library. Archived from the original on 2023-02-20.
- Polybius, Histories, translation Archived 2018-09-11 at the Wayback Machine by W. R. Paton.

=== Modern sources ===
- Astin, A. E.; Walbank, F. W.; Frederiksen, M. W.; Ogilvie, R. M., eds. (2006) [1989]. The Cambridge Ancient History. Vol. VIII (2nd ed.). Cambridge University Press. ISBN 0-521-23448-4.
- Briscoe, John & Simon Hornblower, eds. (2020). Livy: Ab urbe condita Book XXII. Cambridge University Press. ISBN 978-1-108-48014-7. Archived from the original on 2022-01-24.
- Carlton, James. The Military Quotation Book. New York: Thomas Dunne Books, 2002.
- Cottrell, Leonard (1960). Enemy of Rome:The Battles of Hannibal. London: Evans Brothers.
- Daly, Gregory (2002). Cannae: The Experience of Battle in the Second Punic War (PDF). London: Routledge. ISBN 0-415-26147-3. Archived from the original (PDF) on 2020-12-18.
- De Beer, Gavin (1974). Hannibal: The Struggle for Power in the Mediterranean. London: Book Club Associates/Thames & Hudson.
- Delbrück, Hans (1975) [1900]. History of the Art of War volume 1: Warfare in Antiquity. Translated by Renfroe, Walter J. Jr. (3rd ed.). Lincoln: University of Nebraska Press. ISBN 0-8032-6584-0. Archived from the original on 2023-02-20.
- Echevarria, Antulio J. (23 February 2017), "Annihilation and dislocation", Military Strategy: A Very Short Introduction (1 ed.), Oxford University PressNew York, pp. 13–29, doi:10.1093/actrade/9780199340132.003.0002, ISBN 978-0-19-934013-2
- Goldsworthy, Adrian (2001). Cannae. London: Cassell. ISBN 0-304-35714-6.
- Healy, Mark (1994). Cannae 216 BC: Hannibal smashes Rome's Army. Oxford: Osprey. ISBN 1-85532-470-9.
- Hoyos, B. Dexter (2008) [2005]. Hannibal: Rome's greatest enemy. Exeter: Bristol Phoenix. ISBN 1-904675-46-8.
- Lazenby, John Francis (1998) [1978]. Hannibal's War: A Military History of the Second Punic War. Wilts: University of Oklahoma Press. ISBN 978-0-8061-3004-0.
- O'Connell, Robert L. (2010). The Ghosts of Cannae: Hannibal and the Darkest Hour of the Roman Republic. New York: Random House. ISBN 978-1-4000-6702-2. OCLC 455870688.
- Samuels, Martin (1990). "The Reality of Cannae". Militärgeschichtliche Zeitschrift. 47 (1): 7–31. doi:10.1524/mgzs.1990.47.1.7. S2CID 164703621. Archived from the original on 2022-01-24.
- Smith, William (1870). Dictionary of Greek and Roman Biography and Mythology. Vol. III.
- Talbert, Richard J. A., ed. (1985). Atlas of Classical History. Routledge. ISBN 0-415-03463-9.
