= Quintus Mucius Scaevola (praetor 215 BC) =

Quintus Mucius Scaevola (/ˈsiːvələ, ˈsɛv-/ SE(E)V-ə-lə; fl. late 3rd century BC) was a politician of the Roman Republic. He was made praetor in 215 BC, and became governor of Sardinia, a post that was extended twice, first for two years, and then for another year.

Publius Mucius Scaevola and Quintus Mucius Scaevola, consul in 174 BC, are believed to have been his sons, and the brothers Publius Mucius Scaevola and Publius Licinius Crassus Dives Mucianus, both becoming Pontifex Maximus, were therefore his grandsons by Publius, while Quintus Mucius Scaevola Augur was his grandson by Quintus.

== See also ==
- Mucia gens
