= Battle of Lilybaeum =

First naval clash between the navies of Carthage and Rome during the Second Punic War

- Part of the Second Punic War
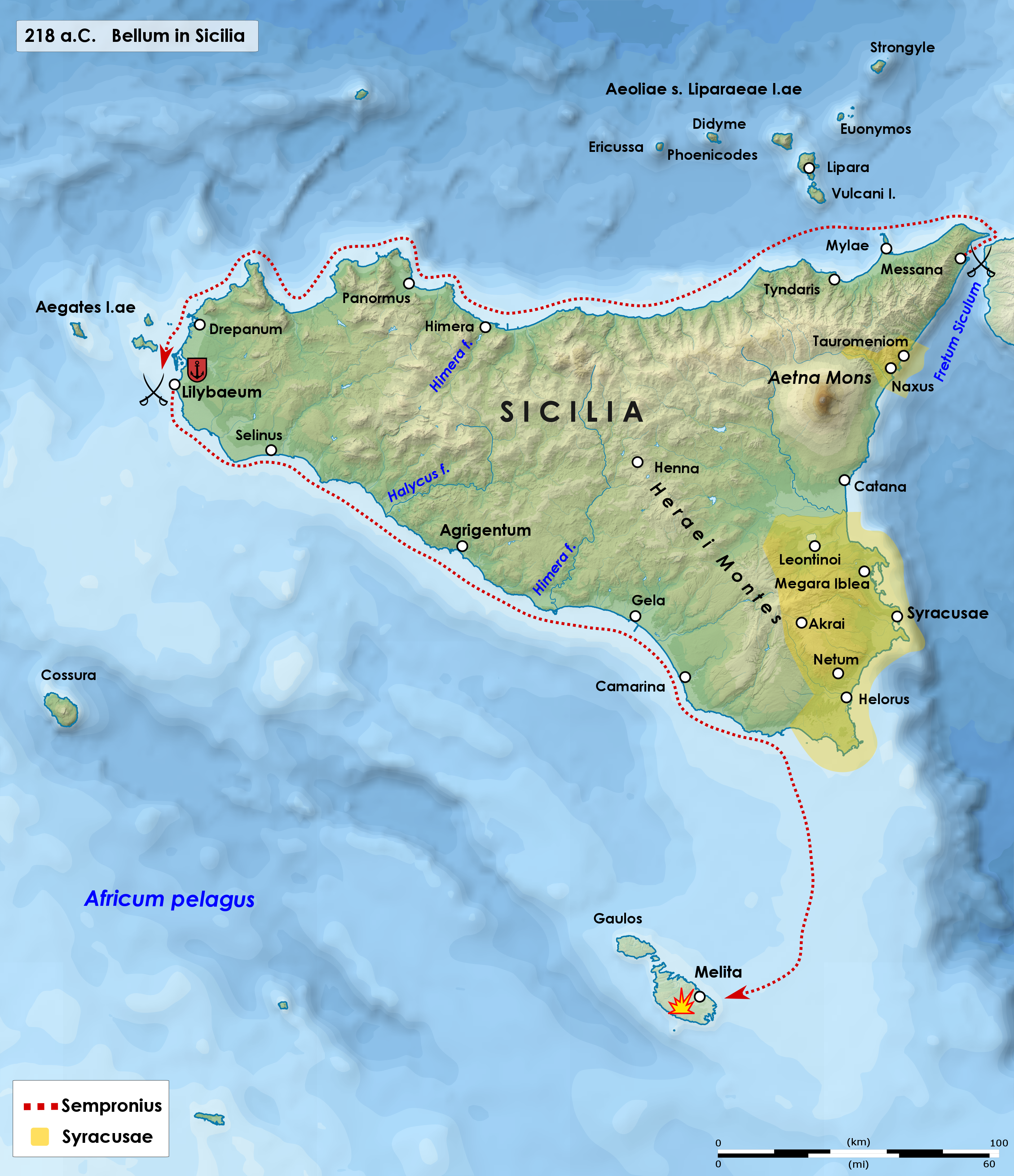
- Naval operations around Sicily in 218 BC
Date	Summer, 218 BC
Location	Near Lilybaeum, Sicily 37°48′00″N 12°26′00″E
Result	Roman victory

Belligerents
Roman Republic	Carthage

Commanders and leaders
Marcus Aemilius Lepidus, Praetor of Sicily	Unknown

Strength
20 Quinqueremes and Triremes	35 Quinqueremes

Casualties and losses
Unknown	7 ships captured
- Location within Sicily Battle of Lilybaeum (Italy) Battle of Lilybaeum (Mediterranean)

The Battle of Lilybaeum was the first clash between the navies of Carthage and Rome in 218 BC during the Second Punic War. The Carthaginians had sent 35 quinqueremes to raid Sicily, starting with Lilybaeum. The Romans, warned by Hiero of Syracuse of the coming raid, had time to intercept the Carthaginian contingent with a fleet of 20 quinqueremes and managed to capture several Carthaginian ships.

== Background ==
Carthage and the Roman Republic had peaceful, if not friendly, relations since signing the first treaty in 509 BC, which had detailed the rights of each power. Treaties were signed in 348 and 306 BC that further established the spheres of influence of each state. Carthage and Rome cooperated against King Pyrrhus and signed a treaty of cooperation in 279 BC. However, Roman involvement in Messina in Sicily in 264 BC led to the First Punic War, which cost Carthage her Sicilian holdings, naval supremacy and a large indemnity. The Roman actions during the Mercenary War favoured Carthage, but they seized Sardinia and Corsica after that war concluded. Carthage rebuilt her fortunes by conquering parts of Iberia under the leadership of Hamilcar, Hasdrubal and Hannibal during 237–218 BC. Rome, at the instigation of Massalia, signed a treaty with Hasdrubal the Fair in 226 BC, which established the Ebro as the limit of Carthaginian power in Iberia. The city of Saguntum, located south of the river, became an ally of Rome some time after 226 BC. When Iberian allies of Hannibal came into conflict with Saguntum, Rome warned Hannibal not to intervene. Faced with the alternative of backing down and losing face, Hannibal opted to attack Saguntum. This was the start of the Second Punic War.

== Strategic situation ==
The Roman Senate had declared war on Carthage after Hannibal had attacked, besieged and finally taken the city of Saguntum in Iberia in 219 BC. Rome had declared Saguntum an ally but had done nothing to help the city during the eight-month-long siege. Once the siege was over, the combatants started to make ready for the coming struggle, which was to last 18 years.

=== Roman preparations ===
The Roman navy had been mobilized in 219 BC, fielding 220 quinqueremes for fighting the Illyrians. Publius Cornelius Scipio received four legions (8,000 Roman and 14,000 allied infantry and 600 Roman and 1,600 allied horse) and was to sail for Iberia escorted by 60 ships.

However, Gauls of the Boii and Insubre tribes in northern Italy attacked the Roman colonies of Placentia and Cremona, causing the Romans to flee to Mutina, which the Gauls then besieged. Praetor L. Manlius Vulso marched from Ariminium with two Roman legions, 600 Roman Horse, 10,000 allied infantry and 1,000 allied cavalry towards Cisalpine Gaul. This army was ambushed twice on the way, losing 1,200 men. Although the siege of Mutina was raised, the army itself fell under a loose siege a few miles from Mutina. This event prompted the Roman Senate to send one of Scipio's legions and 5,000 allied troops to aid Vulso. Scipio had to raise troops to replace these and thus could not set out for Iberia until September 218 BC.

Consul Tiberius Sempronius Longus received four legions (2 Roman and 2 allied, 8,000 Roman and 16,000 allied infantry and 600 Roman and 1,800 allied horse) and instructions to sail for Africa, escorted by 160 quinqueremes. Sempronius had set sail for Sicily, where he was to complete his preparations for invading Africa.

=== Punic preparations ===
Hannibal had dismissed his army to winter quarters after the Siege of Saguntum. In the summer of 218 BC, Hannibal stationed 15,000 soldiers and 21 elephants in Iberia under his brother Hasdrubal Barca, and sent 20,000 soldiers in Africa with 4,000 garrisoning Carthage itself. The army that marched for Italy from Cartagena is supposed to have numbered 90,000 foot and 12,000 cavalry, and 37 elephants. Hannibal divided his army into three columns before crossing the Ebro River, and attacked the Iberian tribes of Ilergetes, Bergusii and Ausetani in Catalonia. In a two-month-long campaign, Hannibal subdued parts of Catalonia between the Ebro, the Pyrenees and the Sicoris river in a swift, if costly campaign.

The Iberian contingent of the Punic navy, which numbered 50 quinqueremes (only 32 were manned) and 5 triremes, remained in Iberian waters, having shadowed Hannibal's army for some way. Carthage mobilized at least 55 Quinqueremes for immediate raids on Italy.

== Prelude ==
The Carthaginian navy struck the first blow of the war when a fleet of 20 quinqueremes, loaded with 1,000 soldiers, raided the Lipari Islands in 218 BC. Another group of eight ships attacked Vulcano island, but was blown off-course in a storm towards the Straits of Messina. The Syracusan navy, then at Messina, managed to capture three of the ships, which surrendered without resistance. Learning from the captured crew that a Carthaginian fleet was to attack Lilybaeum, Hiero II, who was at Messina awaiting the arrival of Sempronius, warned the Roman praetor Marcus Aemilius Lepidus at Lilybaeum about the impending raid.

Roman and Carthaginian campaigns in Sicily, 218 BC

== Battle ==
The Carthaginian fleet was hampered by bad weather and had to wait before commencing their operation. Although the Romans only had 20 ships present at Lilybaeum, the praetor, after receiving the warning from Hiero, provisioned his ships for a long sail and put a proper contingent of Roman legionaries on board each ship before the Carthaginian fleet appeared. He also posted lookouts along the coast to watch out for the Carthaginian ships, giving him early warning and minimizing the risk of surprise.

The Carthaginians had broken their journey at the Aegates Islands, and when they sailed for Lilybaeum on a moonlit night, they intended to make their approach coincide with the dawn. The Roman lookouts spotted them well before they reached the harbour. As the Romans sallied forth, the Carthaginians lowered their sails for battle and moved to the open sea. The Carthaginians outnumbered the Romans, but their ships were undermanned and the Romans had the advantage of containing a larger number of soldiers aboard their ships. Playing to their individual strengths, the Roman ships tried to close with the Carthaginian ships and grapple them, while the Carthaginians tried to evade the onrushing Roman ships and ram them if possible. In the melee, the Romans managed to board and capture seven Carthaginian ships and take 1,700 prisoners. The remaining Carthaginian ships managed to retreat. The Roman losses are unknown.

== Aftermath ==
The Romans had managed to thwart the Carthaginian attempt to establish a base in Sicily. The Consul T. Sempronius Longus soon arrived with his army and fleet in Sicily. He sailed with his fleet to Malta, where he captured the island and collected 2,000 prisoners, along with the Carthaginian garrison commander, Hamilcar Gisco. He then sailed to intercept a Carthaginian naval contingent raiding the Vulcan islands. The Carthaginian contingent had sailed and raided the Roman territory around Vibo in Bruttium. Sempronius received the news of the Battle of Ticinus and was summoned by the Roman senate to aid Scipio. He posted 50 ships at Lilybaeum under Marcus Aemilius, another 25 in Vibo, then sent his army via land and sea to Ariminium.

== Bibliography ==
- Bagnall, Nigel (1990). The Punic Wars. Macmillan. ISBN 0-312-34214-4.
- Cottrell, Leonard (1992). Hannibal: Enemy of Rome. Da Capo Press. ISBN 0-306-80498-0.
- Lazenby, John Francis (1978). Hannibal's War. Aris & Phillips. ISBN 0-8061-3004-0.
- Goldsworthy, Adrian (2003). The Fall of Carthage. Cassel Military Paperbacks. ISBN 0-304-36642-0.
- Peddie, John (2005). Hannibal's War. Sutton Publishing Limited. ISBN 0-7509-3797-1.
- Dodge, Theodore Ayrault (1891). Hannibal. Da Capo Press. ISBN 0-306-81362-9.
