= 218 BC =

218 BC in various calendars
Gregorian calendar	218 BC; CCXVIII BC
Ab urbe condita	536
Ancient Egypt era	XXXIII dynasty, 106
Pharaoh	Ptolemy IV Philopator, 4
Ancient Greek Olympiad (summer)	140th Olympiad, year 3
Assyrian calendar	4533
Balinese saka calendar	N/A
Bengali calendar	−811 – −810
Berber calendar	733
Buddhist calendar	327
Burmese calendar	−855
Byzantine calendar	5291–5292
Chinese calendar	壬午年 (Water Horse); 2480 or 2273 — to — 癸未年 (Water Goat); 2481 or 2274
Coptic calendar	−501 – −500
Discordian calendar	949
Ethiopian calendar	−225 – −224
Hebrew calendar	3543–3544
- Hindu calendars
Vikram Samvat	−161 – −160
Shaka Samvat	N/A
Kali Yuga	2883–2884
Holocene calendar	9783
Iranian calendar	839 BP – 838 BP
Islamic calendar	865 BH – 864 BH
Javanese calendar	N/A
Julian calendar	N/A
Korean calendar	2116
Minguo calendar	2129 before ROC 民前2129年
Nanakshahi calendar	−1685
Seleucid era	94/95 AG
Thai solar calendar	325–326
Tibetan calendar	ཆུ་ཕོ་རྟ་ལོ་ (male Water-Horse) −91 or −472 or −1244 — to — ཆུ་མོ་ལུག་ལོ་ (female Water-Sheep) −90 or −471 or −1243

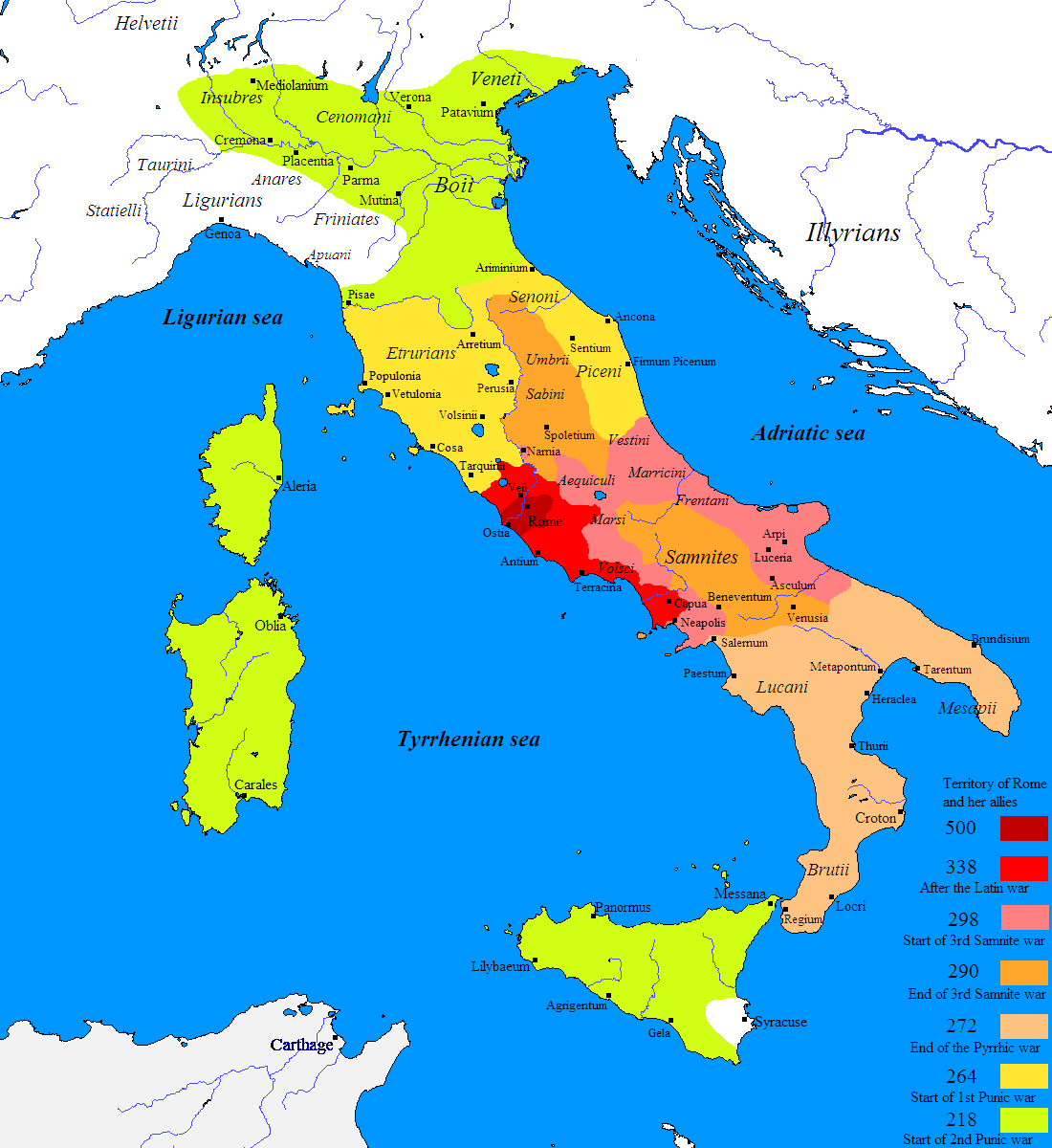
Roman expansion in Italy from 500 BC to 218 BC through the Latin War (light red), Samnite Wars (pink/orange), Pyrrhic War (beige), and First and Second Punic War (yellow and green).

Year 218 BC was a year of the pre-Julian Roman calendar. At the time it was known as the Year of the Consulship of Scipio and Longus (or, less frequently, year 536 Ab urbe condita). The denomination 218 BC for this year has been used since the early medieval period, when the Anno Domini calendar era became the prevalent method in Europe for naming years.

== Events ==
=== By place ===
==== Hispania ====
- Second Punic War

- May/June – Hannibal sets out with around 40,000 men and 50 elephants from New Carthage (Cartagena, Spain) to the north of Spain and then crosses the Pyrenees where his army meets with stiff resistance from the Pyrenean tribes. This opposition and the desertion of some of his Spanish troops diminishes his numbers by half, but he reaches the river Rhône facing little resistance from the tribes of southern Gaul.
- A Roman army under the consul Publius Cornelius Scipio is transported by sea to Massilia (modern Marseille) to prevent Hannibal from advancing on Italy. Scipio himself returns to Italy to take command of the defences in northern Italy on learning Hannibal has already crossed the Rhône.
- Gnaeus Cornelius Scipio Calvus, Publius' brother, takes over the command of the army at Massilia and invades Spain.
- Fall of Saguntum to Hannibal of Carthage (or 219)

==== Roman Republic ====
- Second Punic War

- In response to the threat of Hannibal the Romans assemble three armies:

- The consul prior, Publius Cornelius Scipio, raises two Roman legions and two Latin alae for a total of 22,000 infantry and 2,200 cavalry. He is also assigned 60 warships and hundreds of transports. Scipio receives the Iberian Peninsula as his area of operations (his imperium).
- The consul posterior, Tiberius Sempronius Longus, also raises two Roman legions and two Latin alae for a total of 24,000 infantry and 2,400 cavalry. He gathers a fleet of 180 warships and hundreds of transports. Longus receives Sicily and Africa as his area of operation (his imperium) and manages to carry out the capture of Malta from the Carthaginians. He was to invade Africa and attack Carthage directly until the Roman Senate orders him to travel from Sicily to reinforce Scipio's troops.
- Praetor Lucius Manlius Vulso also receives two legions and raises 10,000 allied infantry and 1,000 allied cavalry (for a total of 18,000 infantry and 1,600 cavalry) and is sent into Cisalpine Gaul to keep an eye on the Celtic tribes.

- September – Battle of the Rhône Crossing: A Carthaginian victory over the Volcae opens Hannibal's way into Italy.
- September/October – Hannibal's crossing of the Alps: Hannibal takes around 38 North African war elephants across the Alps from Gaul into Cisalpine Gaul to invade Rome. Almost none of the elephants survive the harsh conditions. This leads to the Romans cancelling their invasion of Africa.
- late November – Battle of Ticinus: Hannibal defeats Scipio.
- December 22/23 – Battle of the Trebia: Hannibal defeats the combined Roman armies under Sempronius and Scipio.

==== Asia Minor ====
- The city of Selge is besieged by Garsyeris, the general of Achaeus, and eventually forced to surrender, although Logbasis, on the verge of negotiating a treacherous agreement, is killed by his fellow citizens.

==== Seleucid Empire ====
- Fourth Syrian War

- Negotiations between the new Egyptian King Ptolemy IV and the Seleucid King Antiochus III collapse, and Antiochus III renews his advance, overrunning Ptolemy's forward defences, and gaining territory in Lebanon, Palestine and Phoenicia.
