= Battle of Victumulae =

217 BC battle of the Second Punic War

- Part of the Second Punic War
Date	January 217 BC
Location	Ventimiglia, Italy
Result	Carthaginian victory

Belligerents
Cenomani (Cisalpine Gaul)	Carthage

Commanders and leaders
Tiberius Sempronius Longus	Hannibal

Strength
30,000	Unknown

The Battle of Victumulae, fought in January of 217 BC during the Second Punic War, represented a clash of secondary importance, engaged between the army of consul Tiberius Sempronius Longus and the Carthage army of Hannibal, after the victories of the latter reported in Battle of Ticinus and at the Battle of Trebia (end of 218 BC).

== Prelude ==
The Battle of Trebia had just ended with a clear victory for the Carthaginian cavalry and the wounding of the consul Publius Cornelius Scipio (consul 218 BC) in the first, as well as a clear defeat of the army of Tiberius Sempronius Longus (consul 218 BC. ) in the second, where the Roman army was largely destroyed on the field.

The fortress-pantry of Clastidium, where the Romans kept large reserves of food, especially wheat, had also fallen into the hands of Hannibal. Titus Livy, the historian of the 1st century attributes to the prefect of the garrison, the brindisino Dasio, the transfer of the town for the sum, not even exceptional, of four hundred golden nummies.

Of the remnants of the Roman army after the battle of Trebbia, a part was exterminated near the river itself by Hannibal's knights and elephants, while he lingered to recross the course of the freezing river. The cavalry and part of the Roman infantry had managed to return to the camp and, having seen that the Carthaginian forces were unable to cross the river due to tiredness, stiffened by the cold, as well as by the disorder, to return to Piacenza led by Publius Cornelius. Finally, part of the Romans moved to the nearby Roman colony of Cremona, so as not to burden the resources of a single colony with the whole army.

The Battle of Trebia had ended with a clear success for Hannibal. The Carthaginian forces were now positioned in the western Po Valley. There were few casualties among the Iberians and Libyans, many more among the Celts. Livy adds that the rain mixed with snow and the frost caused many victims among the Carthaginians, with almost all the elephants paying the price. The truth is that: This defeat generated such fear in Rome that it was believed that Hannibal would arrive in the city with his banners displayed hostilely. And there would have been no hope of help that the Romans could count on to keep the violence of the Carthaginian away from the gates and walls. The Cisalpine Gaul, theater of operations in the autumn of 218 BC: from the revolt of the Boii with the siege of Modena (218 BC), to Hannibal's victories at the Battle of Trebia

Not even their stay in the winter quarters was peaceful for the Romans, as the Numidian cavalry continued to carry out raids everywhere, and when the places were unsuitable for these raids, the troops of the Celtiberians also intervened and the Lusitanians. In fact, it was difficult to obtain supplies for the Roman troops except through transport along the river Po. There was in fact a first Battle of Piacenza (217 BC) clash of minor importance near Piacenza which saw the victorious Romans and Hannibal leave, wounded in combat, «a circumstance which generated dismay in the souls of the Carthaginians». Following this clash, the deposit was further fortified and defended.

== Battle ==
Hannibal, after resting for a few days, when he recovered from his wound, continued his journey towards the location of Victumulae to conquer it. A Roman deposit had been located here since the time of the Gallic war of the years 225-222 BC. People who belonged to the neighboring populations, probably the Cenomani, had flocked to this location from all over and had gathered here from the nearby campaigns due to fear of looting by the Carthaginians.

This heterogeneous mass, incited by the Battle of Piacenza (217 BC), decided to go to meet Hannibal after arming itself. Rather than in battle order, they looked like a militia marching in a disorderly manner. And since they were 30,000 men inexperienced in military art, they were defeated by Hannibal, who, although he could count on a few well-trained soldiers, had full confidence in them.

== Result ==
The following day the inhabitants of the city of Victumulae, who had taken refuge within the city walls, welcomed the Carthaginian garrison and surrendered, handing them over their weapons. It was then that the victors were given the order to sack the city as if it had been taken by force. No form of massacre was overlooked, so much so that Titus Livy wrote:

[...] such was the example that the Carthaginians then gave of lust, cruelty and inhuman pride against those miserable

— Livio, XXI, 57.14

== Sources ==
- Giovanni Brizzi (2007). Scipione e Annibale, la guerra per salvare Roma. Bari-Roma: Laterza. ISBN 978-88-420-8332-0.
- Giovanni Brizzi (2016). Canne. La sconfitta che fece vincere Roma. Bologna: Il Mulino.
- Theodor Mommsen (2001). Storia di Roma antica. Vol. II. Milano: Sansoni.
- André Piganiol (1989). Le conquiste dei romani. Milano: Il Saggiatore.
- Howard H.Scullard (1992). Storia del mondo romano. Dalla fondazione di Roma alla distruzione di Cartagine. Vol. I. Milano: BUR.
