= Melite (ancient city) =

Ancient city in Malta

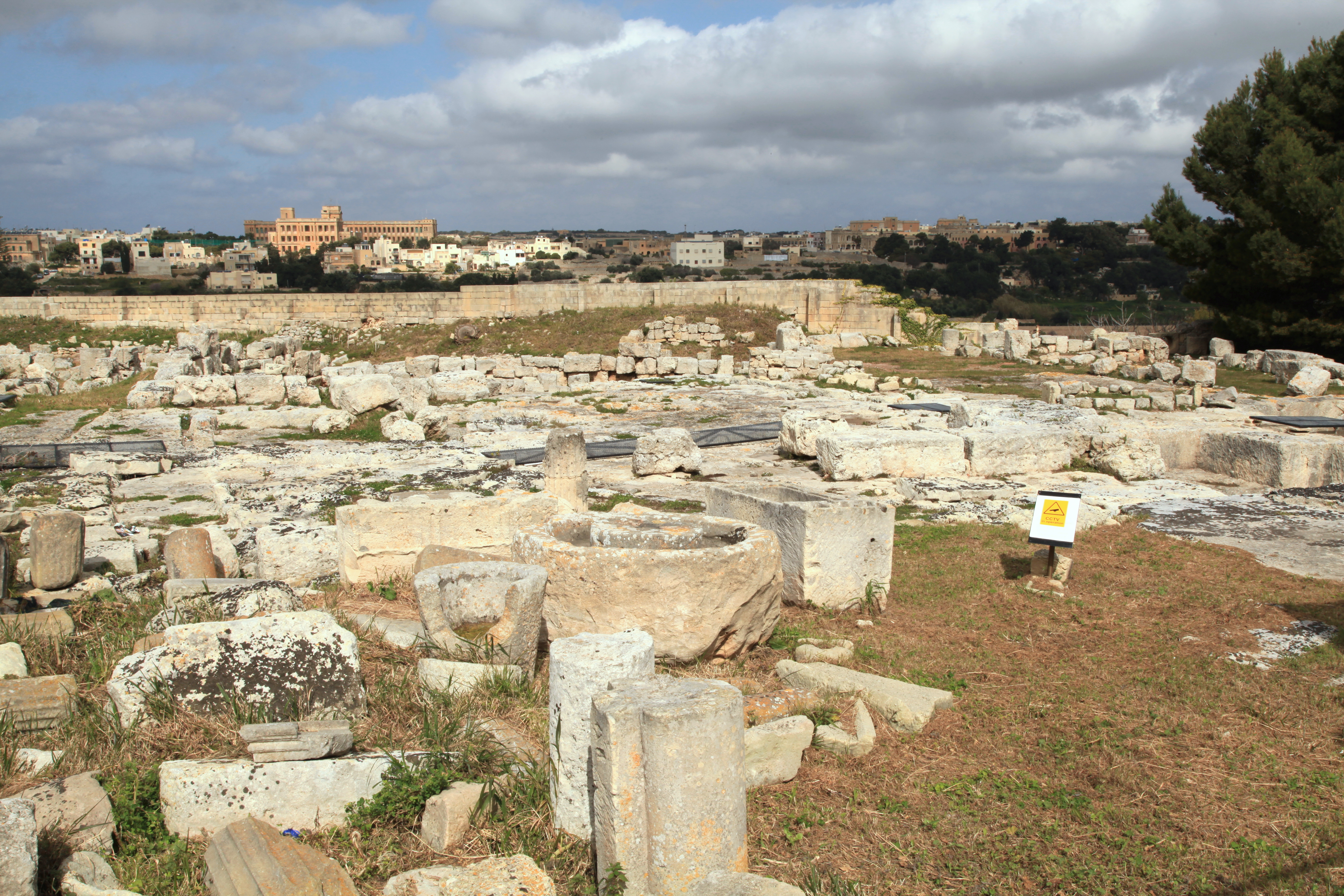
- Ruins of the Domus Romana, one of the few visible remains of Melite

- Location within Malta
- 35°53′7″N 14°24′0″E
- Location: Malta
- Region: Northern Region

History
- Built: c. 8th or 7th century BC
- Built by: Phoenicians, Carthaginians, Romans and Byzantines
- Abandoned: 870 AD

Site notes
- Material: mainly limestone and marble
- Area: c. 0.32 km^{2} (0.12 sq mi)
- Condition: Largely destroyed or built over, a few remains survive

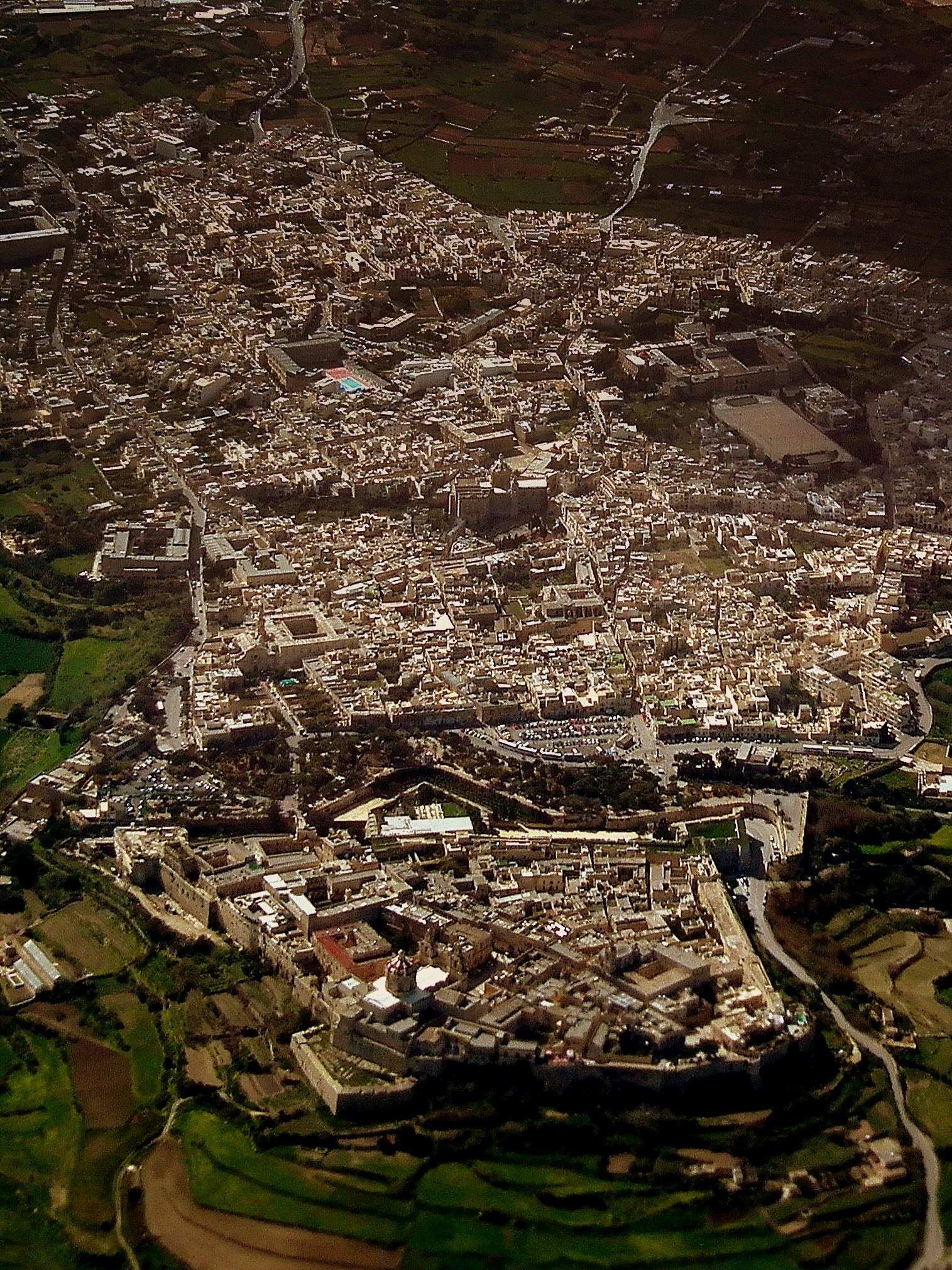
Melite was located on the site of modern Mdina (bottom) and Rabat (top)

Melite (Ancient Greek: Μελίτη, Melítē) or Melita (Latin) was an ancient city located on the site of present-day Mdina and Rabat in Malta. It started out as a Bronze Age settlement, which developed into a city called Ann (Phoenician: 𐤀𐤍𐤍, ʾnn) under the Phoenicians and became the administrative centre of the island. The city fell to the Roman Republic in 218 BC, and it remained part of the Roman and later the Byzantine Empire until 870 AD, when it was captured and destroyed by the Aghlabids. The city was then rebuilt and renamed Medina, giving rise to the present name Mdina. It remained Malta's capital city until 1530.

Only a few vestiges of the Punico-Roman city have survived. The most substantial are the ruins of the Domus Romana, in which a number of well-preserved mosaics and statues have been found. Sparse remains of other buildings and parts of the city walls have been excavated, but no visible remains of the city's numerous temples, churches and other public buildings survive.

== History ==
=== Prehistory ===
Melite was located on a strategically important plateau on high ground in the western part of the island of Malta. The site had been inhabited since prehistory, and by the Bronze Age it was a place of refuge since it was naturally defensible.

=== Phoenician colony ===
The Phoenicians founded the city of Ann soon after they colonized the island, which shared its name, around the 8th century BC. A number of Punic tombs have been found in Rabat, in the area that would have been outside the walls of Ann.

=== Roman city ===
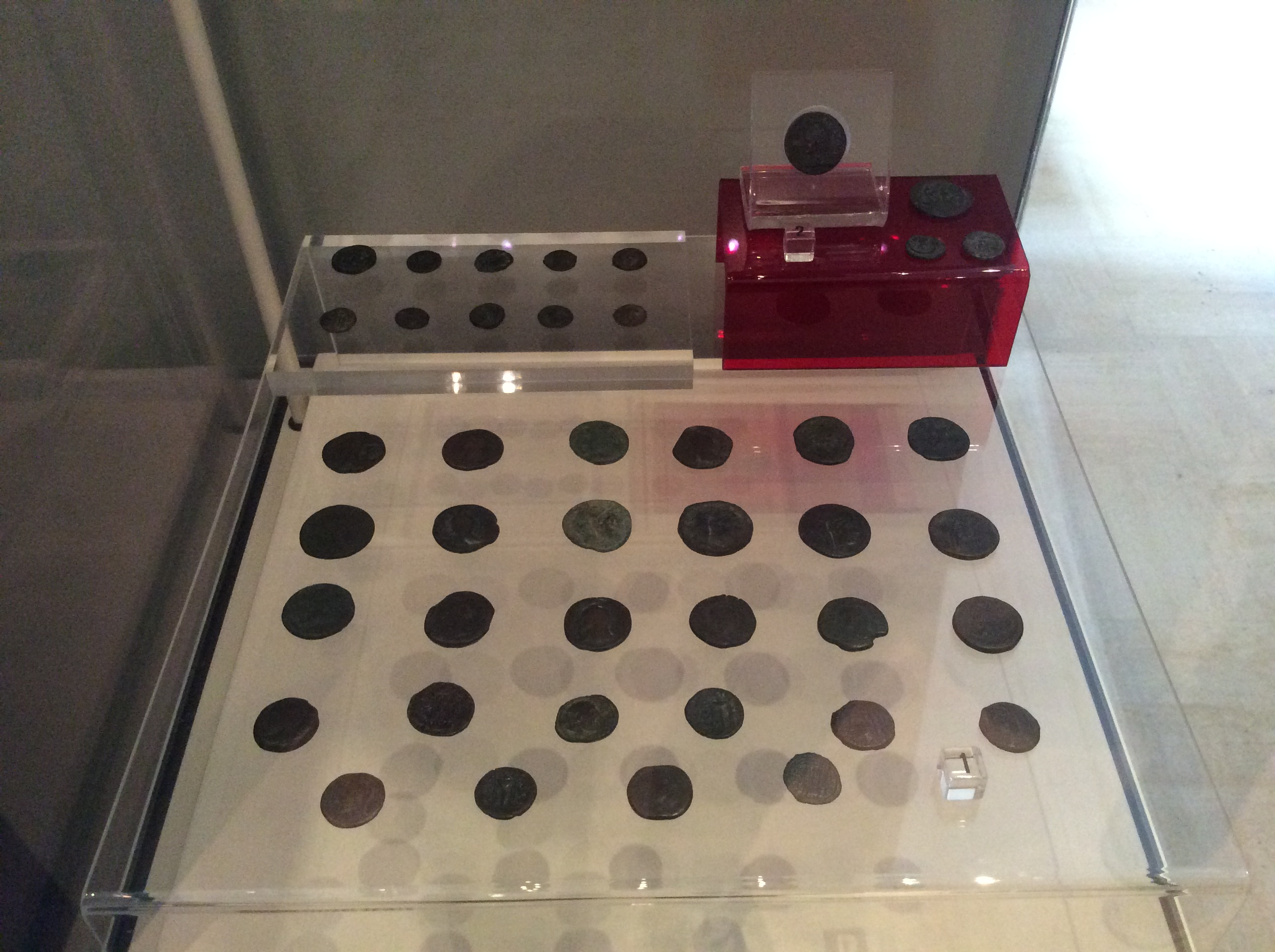
Coins found on site

Roman rule in Malta was established in the early stages of the Second Punic War. In 218 BC, Roman consul Tiberius Sempronius Longus sailed with his fleet from Sicily to Ann, and the Carthaginian commander Hamilcar surrendered without offering much resistance. The Greek and Roman names for the island had been taken from its chief port at Maleth, present-day Cospicua on the Grand Harbor. With the island integrated into the Roman province of Sicilia, its center of administration became known as Melita as well. The city was regarded as a haven, far from the politics of Rome.

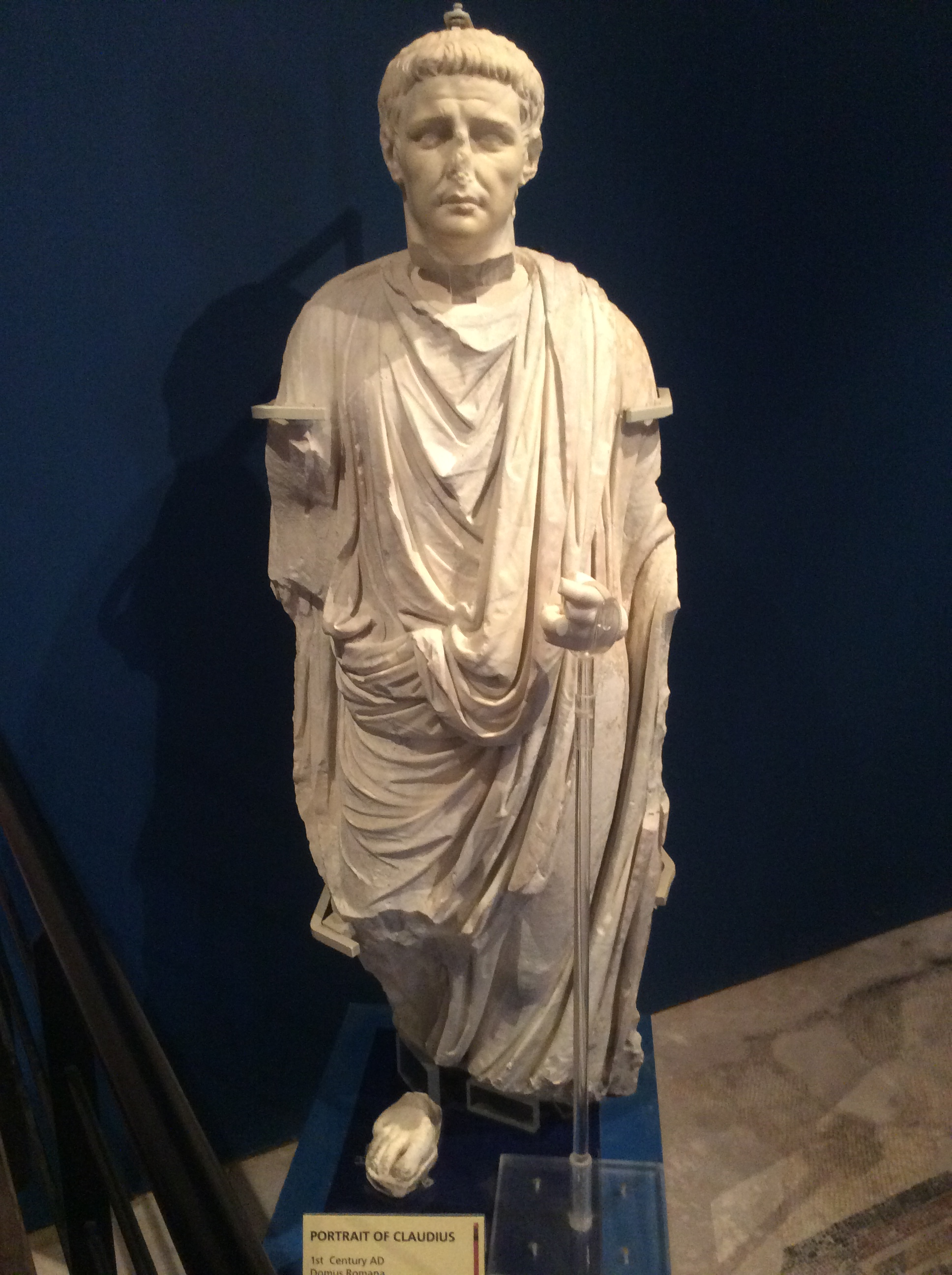
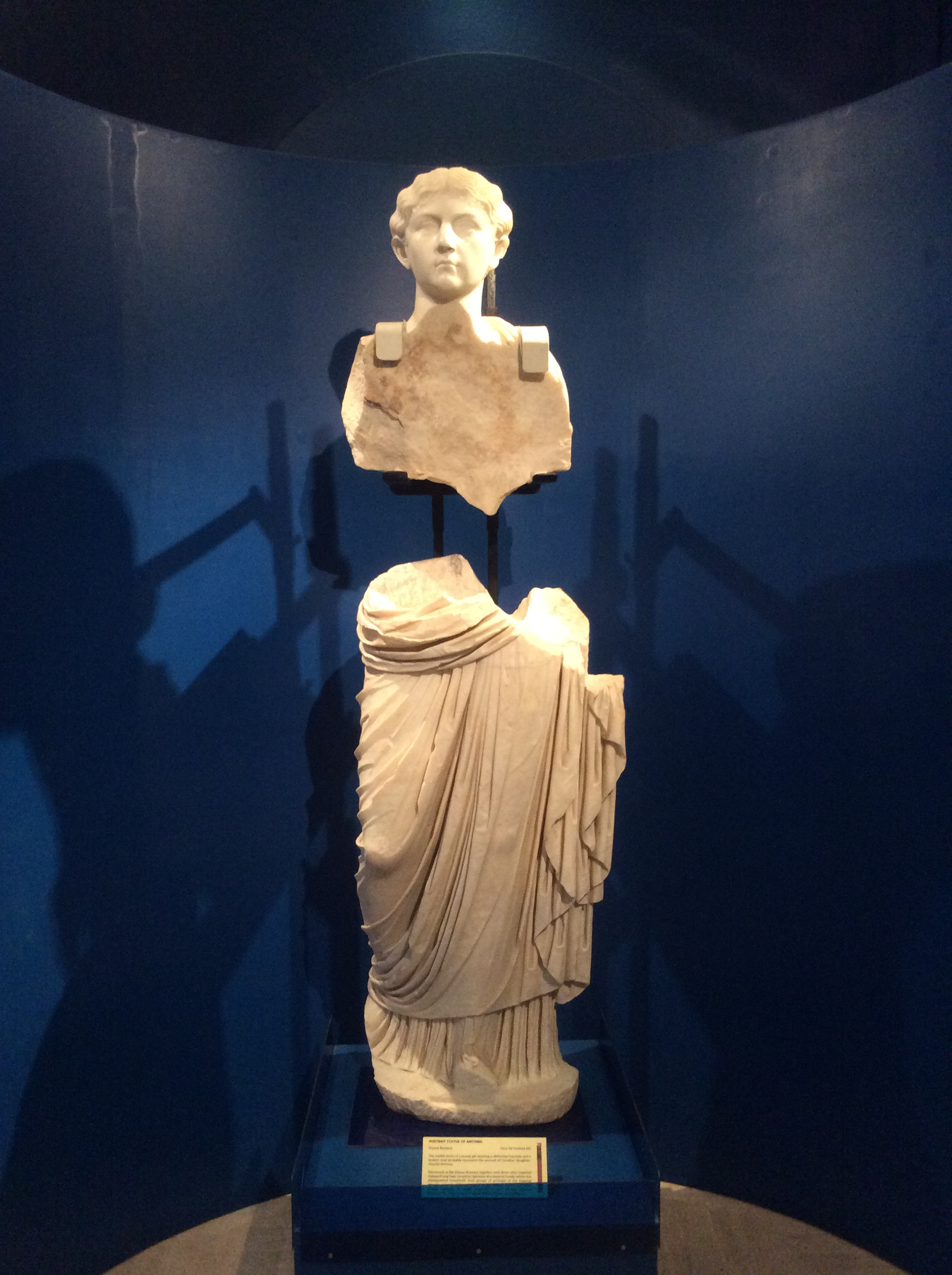
Statues of Emperor Claudius and his daughter Claudia Antonia found at the Domus Romana

During the early Roman occupation, Melita had the status of a foederata civitas like other cities in Sicilia such as Messana (modern Messina) and Tauromenium (modern Taormina). Its inhabitants were regarded as socii and not as conquered people, so they retained their laws and had the right to mint their own coins. Although the Latin language and Roman religion were introduced, Punic culture and language survived in Malta until at least the 1st century AD. Eventually, Melita was given the status of municipium, being granted the same rights as other Roman cities.

According to the Acts of the Apostles, Paul the Apostle was shipwrecked on Malta in AD 60, greeted by its governor Publius, and miraculously cured the governor's sick father before leaving. Christian legend holds that the population of Malta then converted to Christianity, with Publius becoming Bishop of Malta and then Bishop of Athens before being martyred in 112.

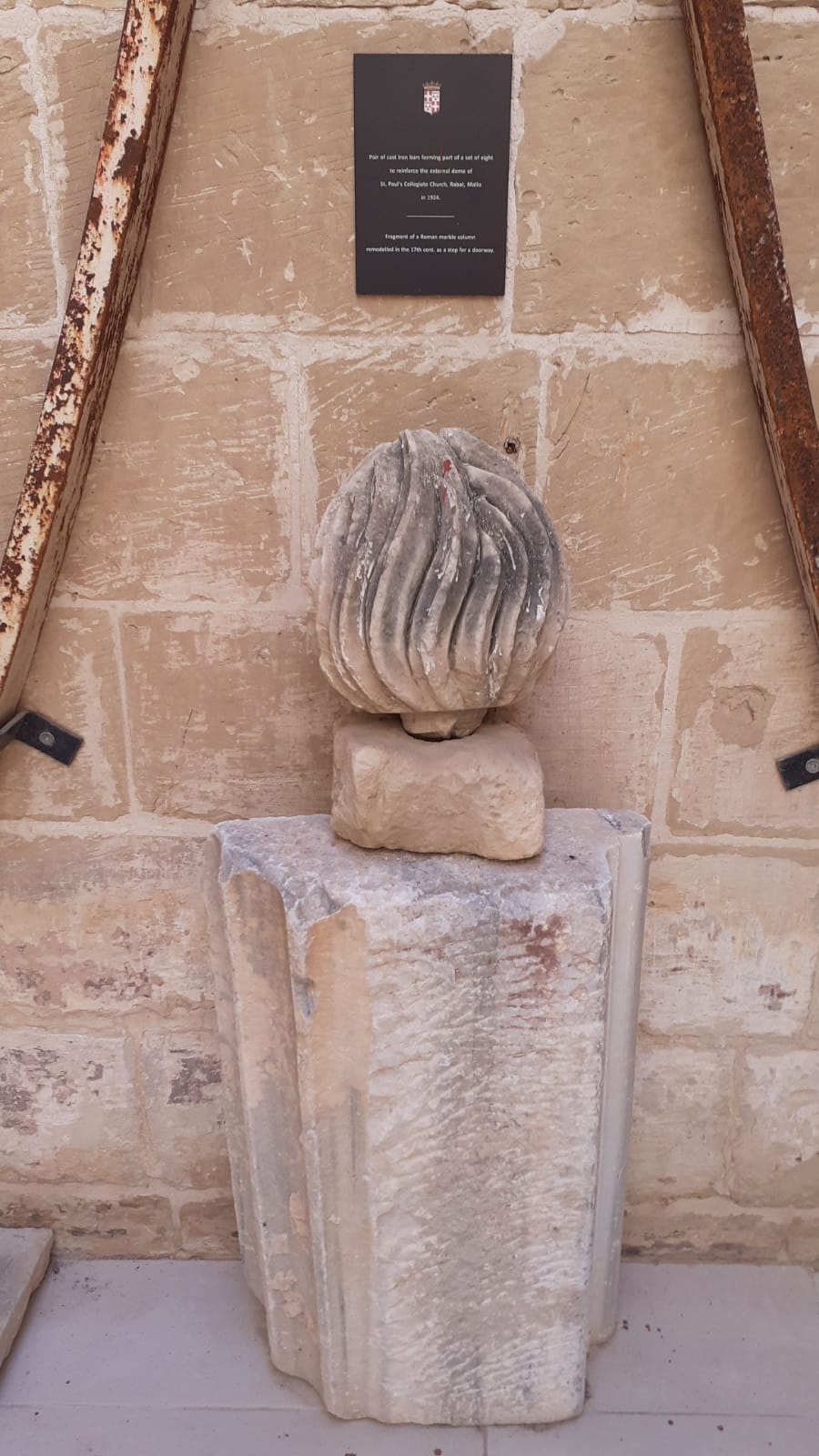
Remains of a Roman building, used for the building of the church, now at the Wignacourt Museum

Little is known about the city's layout since very few remains have survived. It was surrounded by thick walls and a ditch, with a number of cemeteries located outside the walls. According to tradition, the Mdina Cathedral was built on the site of the governor's residence, where Saint Paul cured Publius' father. A theatre was located in the city, and a Temple of Apollo stood nearby. The temple had a tetrastyle portico, and a wall forming part of its podium still exists beneath present-day Villegaignon Street.

A Temple of Proserpina stood on the hill of Mtarfa, outside the walls of Melita. Only a fragment of a marble column and parts of a Punic cornice remain from this temple, but its existence is known from the Chrestion inscription, an inscription discovered in 1613 recording that the temple was renovated during the reign of Augustus. A statue of Saint Nicholas now stands on the site of the temple.

=== Later history ===
The Maltese Islands were incorporated into the Byzantine province of Sicily by 535. Melite remained the administrative center of the island, but little is known about Byzantine period in the city. They might have built a retrenchment which reduced Melite to the size of present-day Mdina, one-third of the size of the Punico-Roman city. The retrenchment was probably built in around the 8th century to counter the increasing Muslim threat, although it might have been built later on in around the 11th century by the Arabs. Regardless when the retrenchment was built, the new walls were most likely built out of stones taken from demolished buildings of the ancient city.

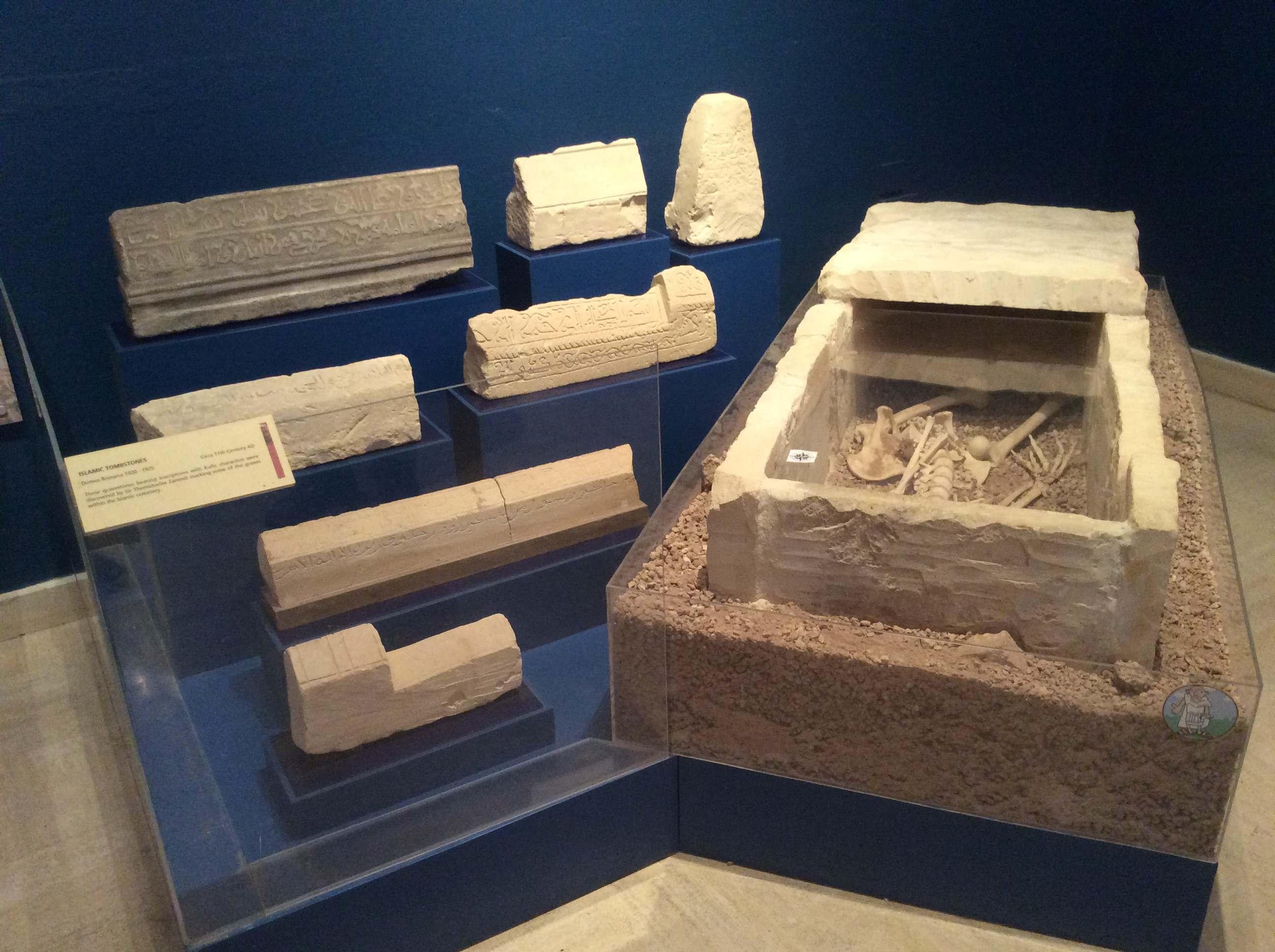
Sarcophagus and limestone tombstones from a Muslim cemetery established in the 11th century on the ruins of the Domus Romana

Melite was captured and destroyed by the Aghlabids in 870. According to Al-Himyarī, at the time the city was ruled by the Byzantine governor Amros (probably Ambrosios). The duration of the siege is not known, but it must have lasted for a couple of weeks or possibly some months. The Aghlabid force was led by an engineer Halaf al-Hādim, who lost his life in the fighting. A new wali, Sawāda Ibn Muḥammad, was then sent from Sicily to continue the siege. After some time, Melite fell to the invaders, and the inhabitants were massacred, the city was destroyed and its churches were looted. Marble from Melite's churches was used to build the castle of Sousse in modern-day Tunisia.

According to Al-Himyarī's account, the island remained almost uninhabited until it was resettled in around 1048 or 1049 by a Muslim community and their slaves, who built a settlement called Medina on the site of Melite, making it "a finer place than it was before." The Byzantines attempted to retake the city in around 1053–54, but were repelled by the defenders. However, archaeological evidence suggests that the city was already a thriving Muslim settlement by the beginning of the 11th century, so Al-Himyarī's account might be unreliable in this aspect.

The city of Medina, later called Mdina in Maltese, remained the capital city of Malta throughout the medieval period until 1530, when the Order of St. John established their seat in Birgu. The city was subsequently known as Città Vecchia (Old City) or Città Notabile (Noble City). It was extensively rebuilt over the centuries, with the last major building project occurring in 1720s, when its fortifications were upgraded and many public buildings were built.

== Remains ==
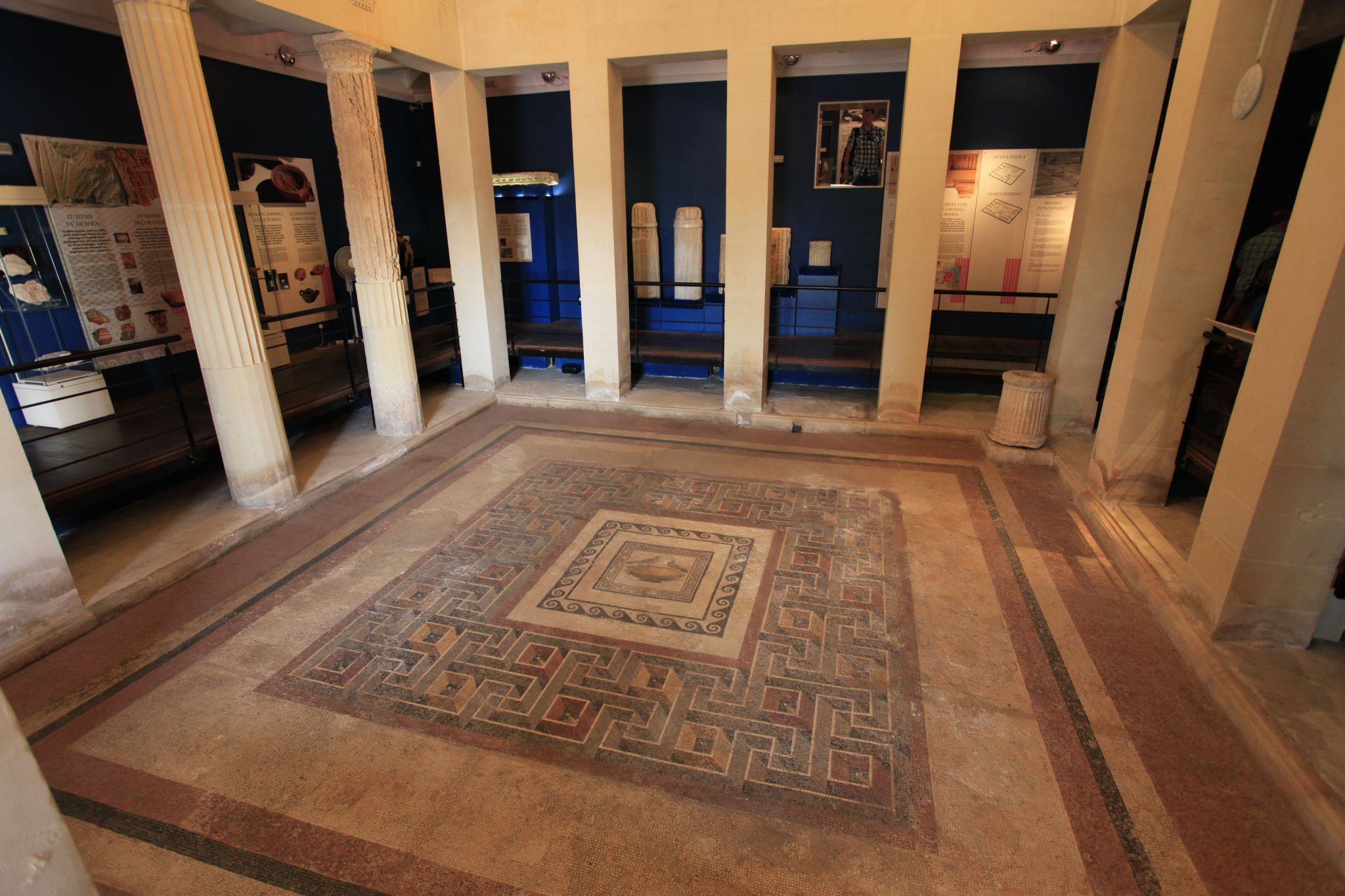
The peristyle mosaic of the Domus Romana

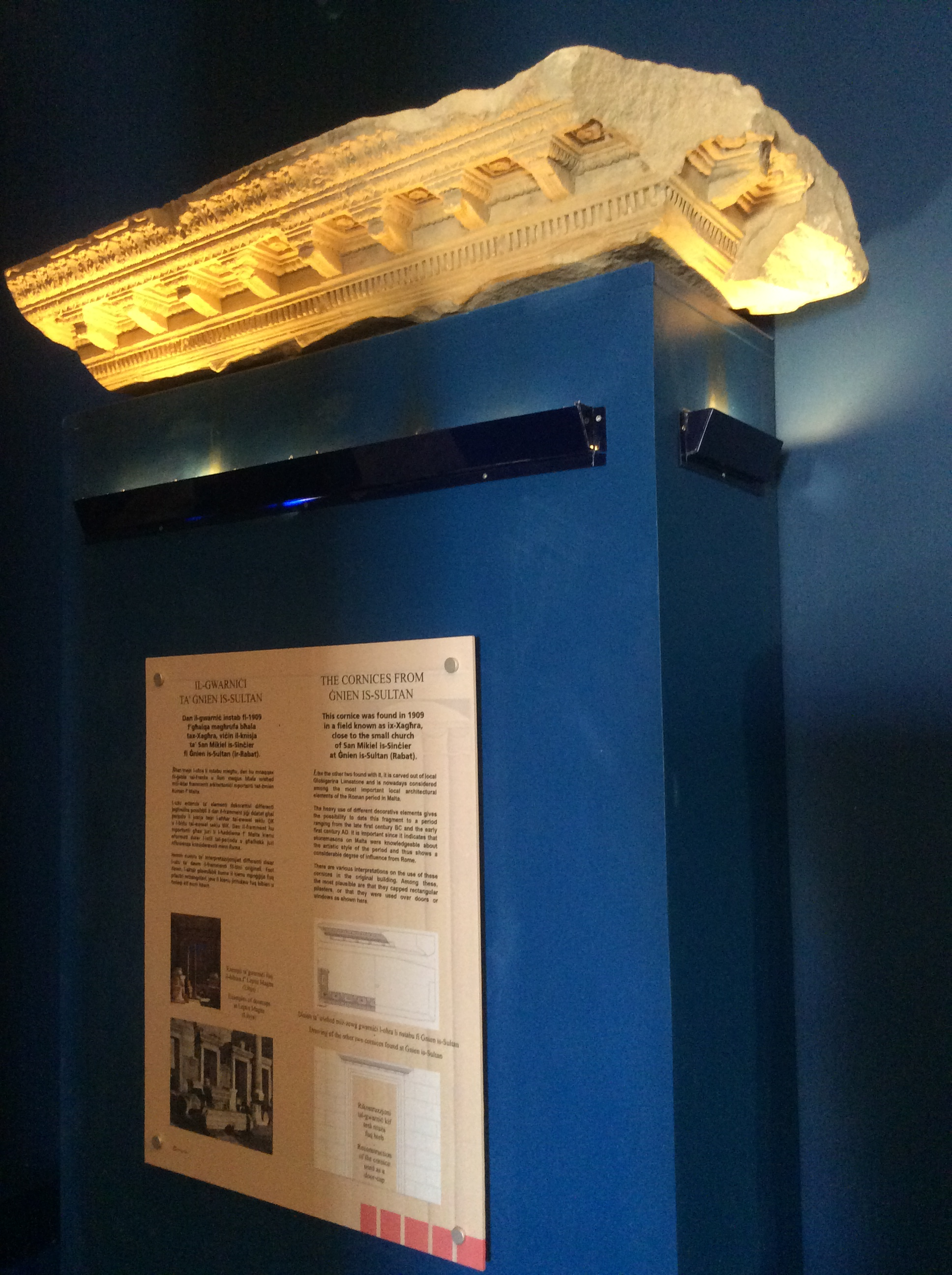
Roman cornice found at Ġnien is-Sultan in Rabat, considered to be one of the most elaborate Roman remains in Malta

According to Giovanni Francesco Abela, many architectural fragments from Melite were still visible in Mdina in the mid-17th century. From the late 17th to the 19th centuries, some marble columns and other remains from the temples of Apollo and Proserpina, and other buildings from Melite, were taken and sculpted into decorative elements for various houses and churches, including St. Paul's Cathedral in Mdina, St. Paul's Grotto in Rabat and the Franciscan Church of St Mary of Jesus, the Church of the Holy Souls, Auberge d'Italie and the Castellania in Valletta.

Very few remains of Melite still exist today, and no significant ruins of the city's temples, basilicas or triumphal arches have survived. The most substantial remnant is the Domus Romana, a townhouse dating back to the 1st century BC and which was abandoned in the 2nd century AD. An Islamic cemetery was established on its ruins in the 11th century, and the site was discovered accidentally in 1881. Subsequent excavations revealed the foundations of the house, including well-preserved mosaics and statues. The remains of the domus are now open to the public as a museum run by Heritage Malta.

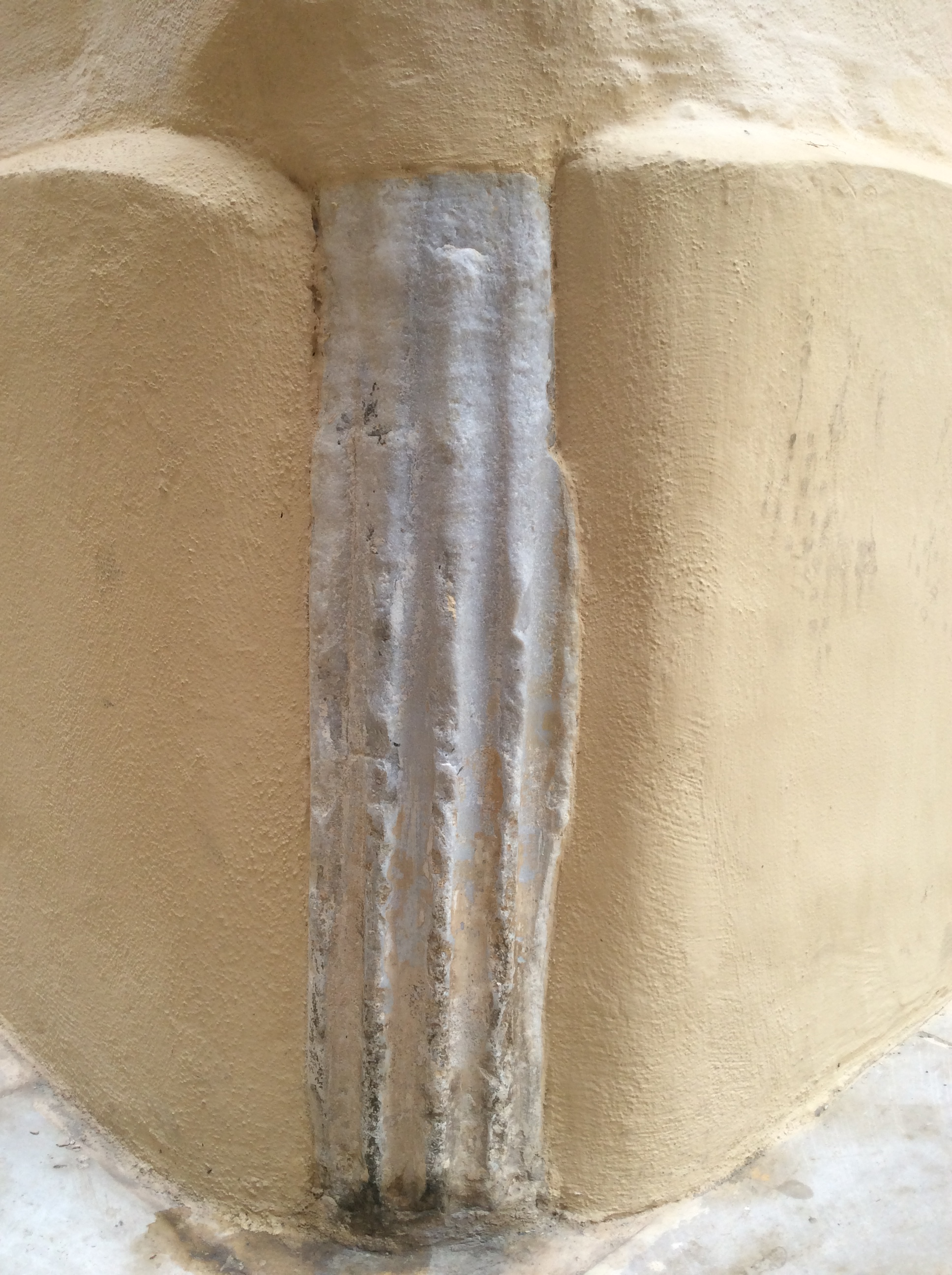
Reuse of a Roman column, part of the façade of Palazzo Falson

The remains of a city gate or tower within the walls of Melite were discovered in Saqqajja in modern Rabat, about 5 m (16 ft) below the current street level. Parts of the city's 700 m (2,300 ft)-long ditch have survived under present-day St. Rita Street and the Church of St. Paul. The lower foundations of some Punico-Roman ramparts, consisting of rusticated ashlar blocks three courses high still in situ, were unearthed in 2010 in excavations near the Magazine Curtain in the western part of Mdina. The only other remains of the ancient walls are Punico-Roman masonry blocks which were reused in the medieval period. These include a wall around Greeks Gate, and some stones which were discovered in excavations at Inguanez Street and the Xara Palace.

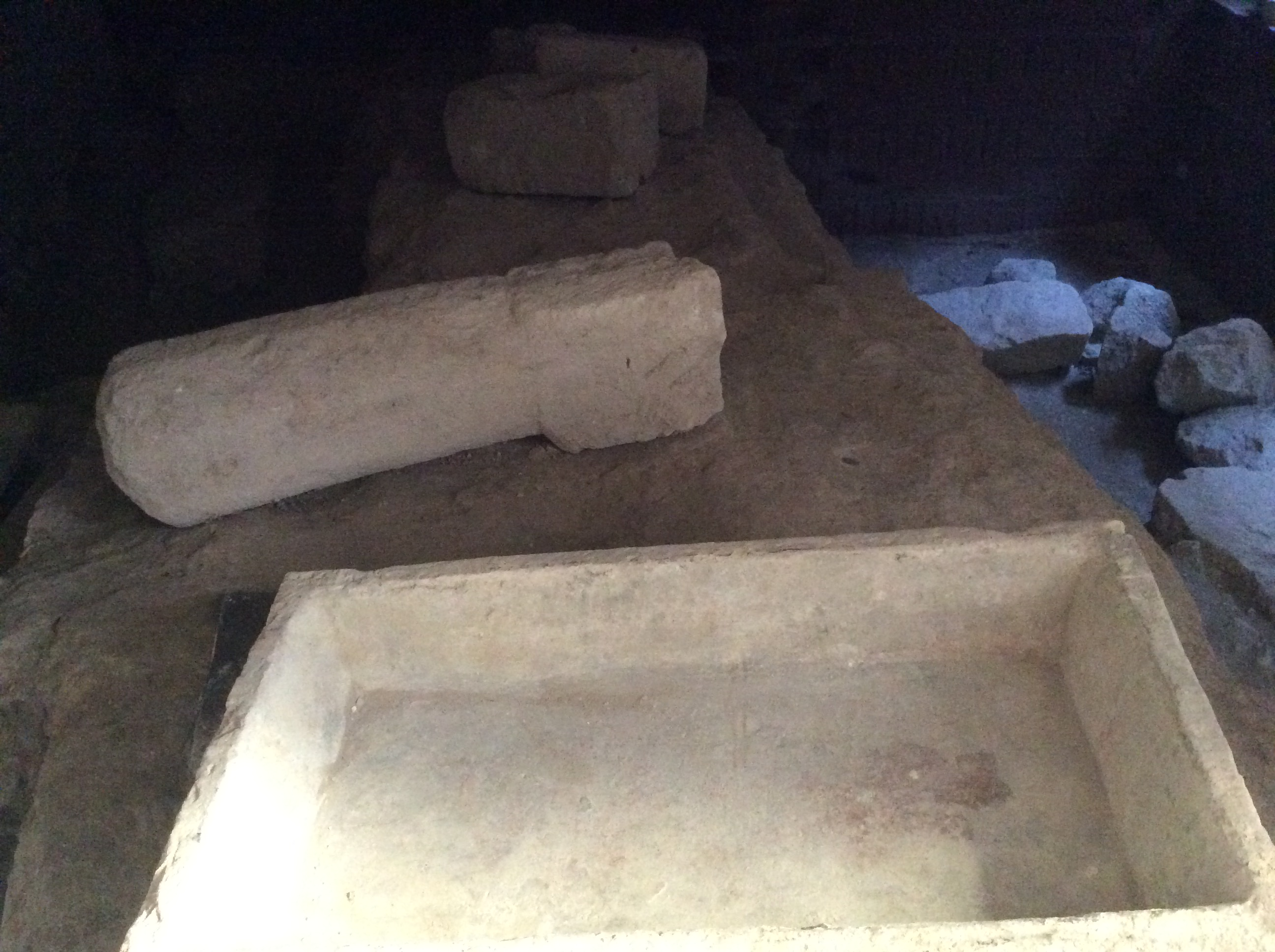
Roman remains at Palazzo Castelletti in Rabat

Sections of a Roman road, cisterns, canals and other archaeological remains were discovered beneath Palazzo Castelletti in Rabat. Some inscriptions, column capitals and other architectural remains from ancient Melite have also been found, and these are now preserved at the Domus Romana museum and the Cathedral Museum in Mdina, or in private collections. Parts of the podium of the Temple of Apollo were discovered in 2002. The remains of other ancient buildings, as well as pottery, coins or other artifacts from the Bronze Age or Punico-Roman period, are still occasionally discovered in excavations or during construction projects in Mdina or Rabat.

A small statue of the Egyptian goddess Isis and an elaborate cornice were also found in Rabat.

Many catacombs, together with a number of both Punic and Roman tombs, are found in Rabat. These were originally located just outside the walls of Melite. The catacombs of the period also include those of a Jewish community.

== Legacy ==
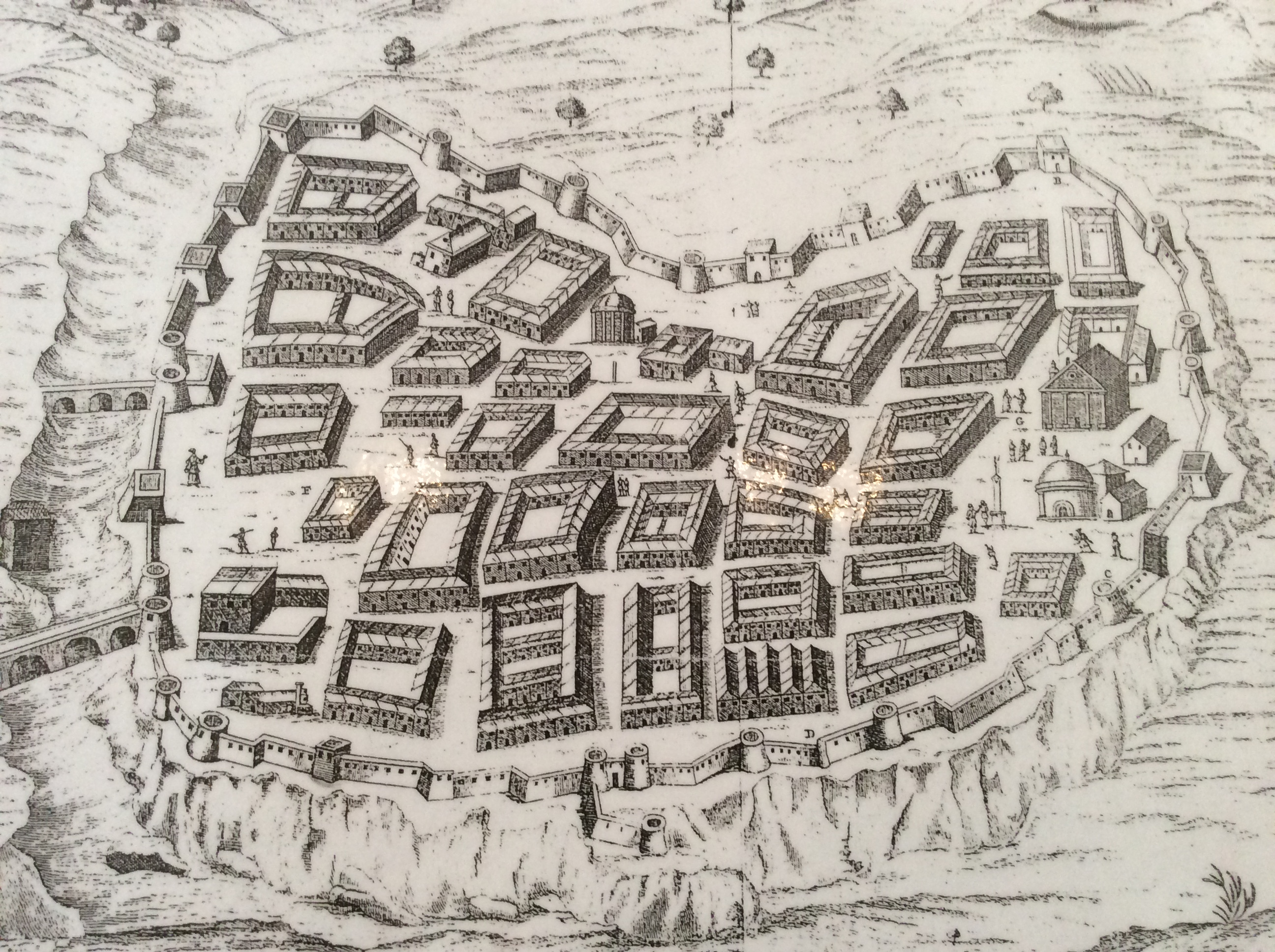
A highly conjectural map of Melite (1647)

The city of Melite shared its name with the main island of Malta and subsequently the entire country.
