= Domvs Romana =

Roman and Muslim archaeological site in Malta

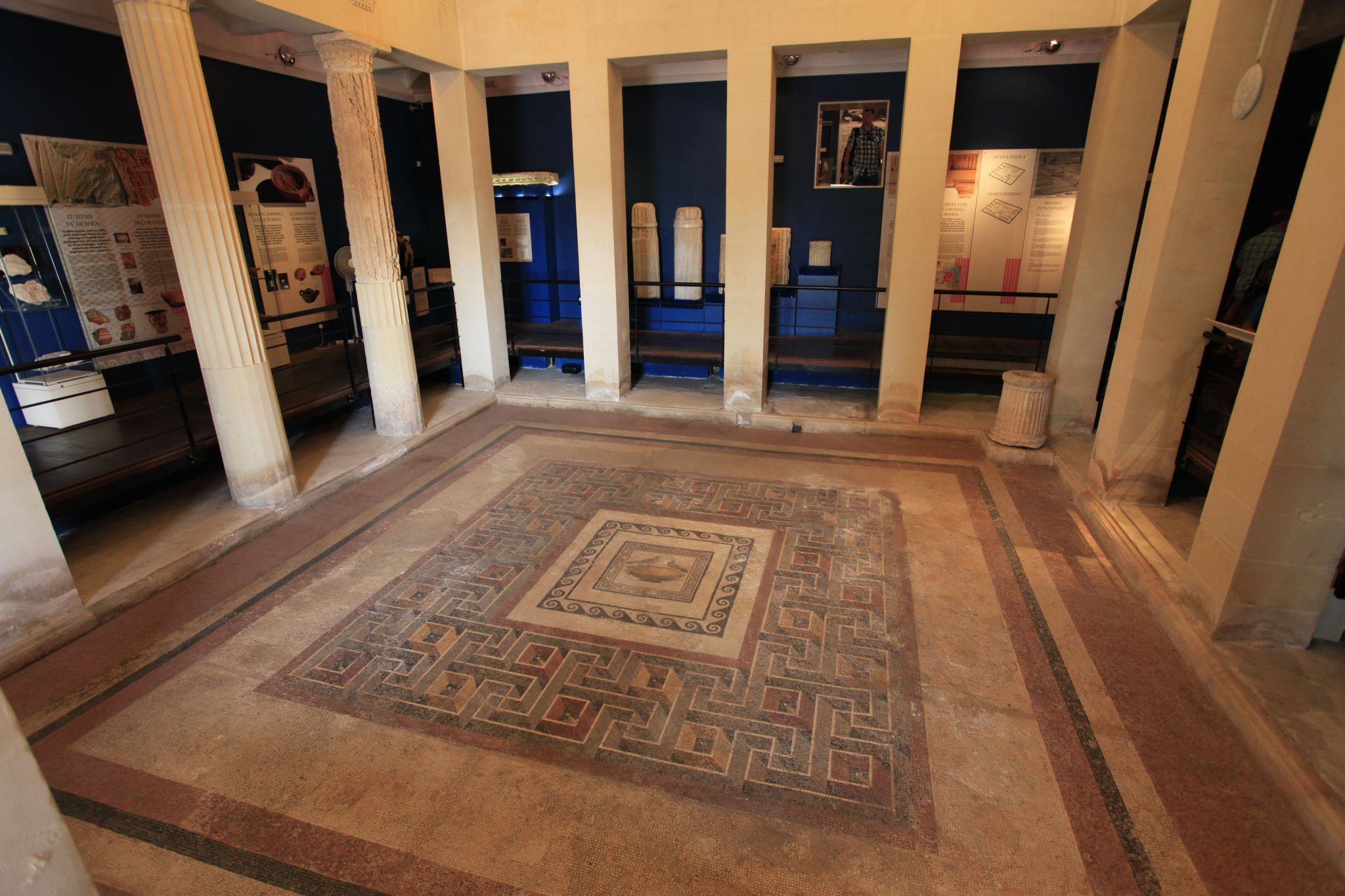
- The mosaic of the peristyle of the Domus Romana
- Interactive map of Domvs Romana
- 35°53′7.1″N 14°24′0.3″E
- Type: Domus; Cemetery
- Periods: Roman (house); Arab (cemetery)
- Location: Mdina/Rabat, Malta
- Part of: Melite

History
- Built: 1st century BC
- Abandoned: 2nd century AD; 11th century AD

Site notes
- Material: Limestone and marble
- Excavation dates: 1881, 1920–1925
- Archaeologists: Antonio Annetto Caruana; Themistocles Zammit
- Discovered: 1881
- Condition: Ruins
- Owner: Government of Malta
- Management: Heritage Malta
- Public access: Yes
- Website: Heritage Malta

The Domus Romana (Latin for "Roman House"), stylized as the Domvs Romana (after Latin's lack of distinction between u and v), is a ruined Roman-era house located on the boundary between Mdina and Rabat, Malta. It was built in the 1st century BC as an aristocratic town house (domus) within the Roman city of Melite. In the 11th century, a Muslim cemetery was established on the remains of the domus.

The site was discovered in 1881, and archaeological excavations revealed several well-preserved Roman mosaics, statues and other artifacts, as well as a number of tombstones and other remains from the cemetery. Since 1882, the site has been open to the public as a museum, which is currently run by Heritage Malta. It was erroneously called the Roman Villa when rediscovered as it was thought to be outside the city of Melite but on further examinations, it was clarified to be within the limits of the ancient city.

== History and description ==
=== Roman house ===
The Domvs Romana is believed to have been built in the beginning of the 1st century BC, and remained in use until the 2nd century AD. The house had a colonnaded peristyle inspired by ancient Greek architecture, and its best features are the well-made polychrome Hellenistic-style mosaics found in the peristyle and the surrounding rooms, which show decorative motifs or mythological scenes. Two types of tesserae were employed: opus vermiculatum, in the centre of the pavement; opus tessellatum, larger tesserae to create three-dimensional designs all around the main image. The picture sought to imitate a highly popular motif which may have been first painted by an artist from Sophos. The domus also shows fine painted wall plaster imitating coloured marbles and showing partly stylized architectural elements which would place them somewhere between the 1st and 2nd Pompeian Styles.

Although the house was mostly destroyed over time, its mosaics have survived largely intact, and they are comparable with those found at Pompeii or Sicily. A number of 1st century AD statues of the imperial Roman family, along with coins, glassware, tableware, bath accessories, amphorae and other fine artifacts have also been found in the domus.

=== Muslim cemetery ===
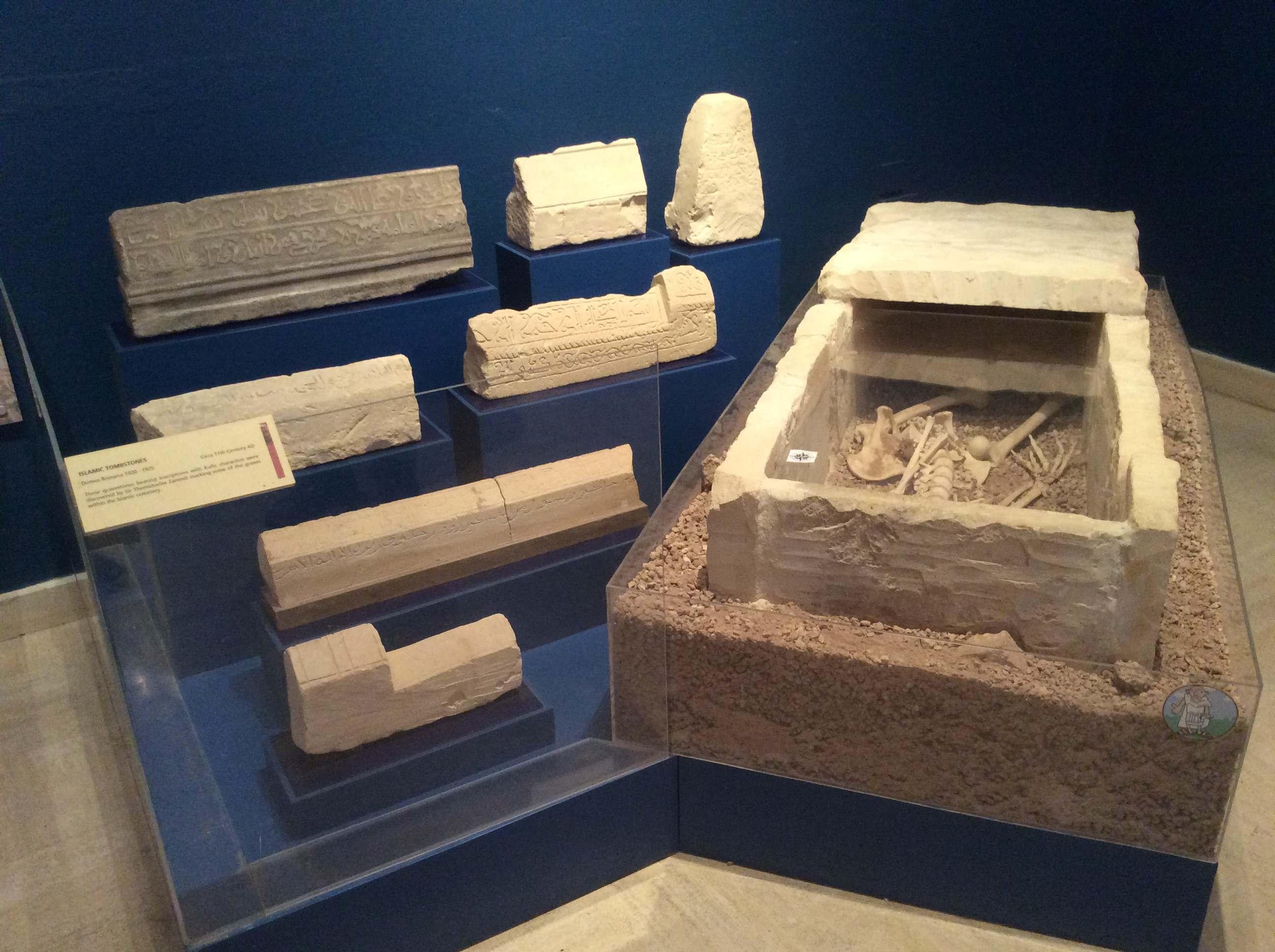
Sarcophagus and limestone tombstones from the Muslim cemetery, now exhibited in the museum

In the 11th century, while Malta was part of the Fatimid Caliphate, the site of the domus was converted into a cemetery. At least 245 burials were discovered during the excavations, which also unearthed a number of limestone (and one marble) tombstones with Naskh or Kufic inscriptions. Some ceramics and a silver ring were also found during the excavations.

== Discovery and excavations ==
The Domvs Romana was discovered accidentally on 3 February 1881 by workers planting trees in Howard Gardens. Grazio Bugeja found a mosaic at just over 1 metre (3 ft 3 in) below surface level. Government officials were informed and the following day Emanuele Luigi Galizia, the Superintendent of Public Works, secured permission to investigate the site. It was subsequently excavated by the leading archaeologists of the time, including Antonio Annetto Caruana, Sir Themistocles Zammit, Robert V. Galea, Harris Dunscombe Colt and Louis Upton Way.

During the 1880s other archaeological work in Malta took place at Ta' Kaċċatura and Borġ in-Nadur and Maltese officials discussed the need for a national museum and a permanent authority to oversee the investigation and preservation of archaeological sites.

== Museum ==
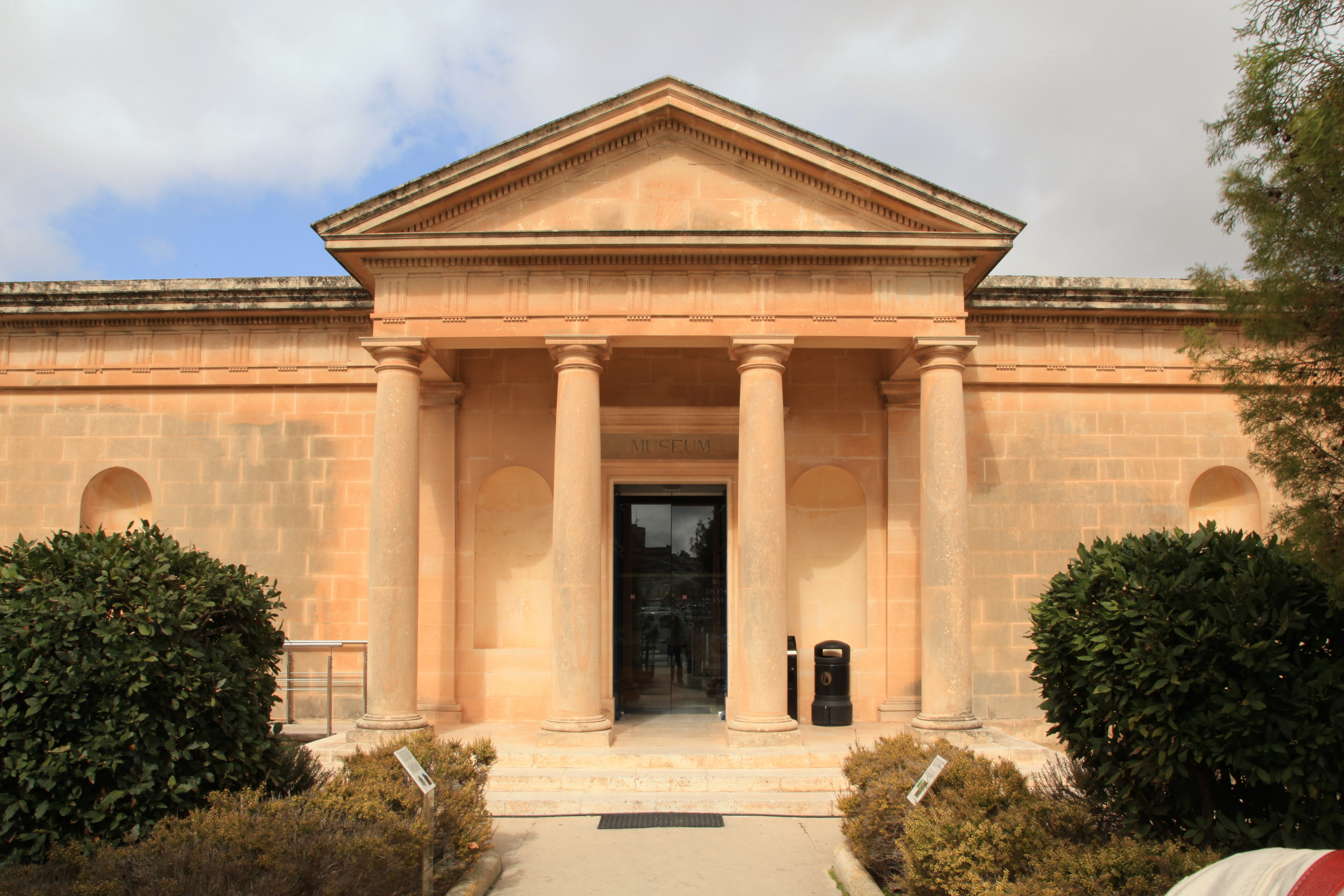
The Domvs Romana museum

After the domus was first excavated, a museum was built on the site of the peristyle of the house in order to preserve its mosaics. The museum opened in February 1882, and it was the first building in Malta that was constructed specifically to house a museum of a particular archaeological site. The museum was originally known as the Museum of Roman Antiquities, and apart from the mosaics and other Roman or Muslim artifacts uncovered from the domus, it also exhibited some other Roman marble pieces which were found in the streets of Mdina. Eventually, many Roman artifacts found elsewhere in Malta were transferred to this museum.

In 1922, the museum was enlarged to designs by the architect Galizia, and a neoclassical façade and a large display room were added. The remains of the domus were included on the Antiquities List of 1925. The museum closed during World War II, and it housed a restoration centre before reopening to the public in 1945.

The mosaic of the peristyle was restored in the second half of the 20th century, but was unintentionally damaged in the process. Currently, Heritage Malta is carrying out a report on how to conserve the mosaic and repair it with as little damage as possible. The displays of the museum were renovated between 2002 and 2005, and again in 2011.
