= Publius Cornelius Scipio (consul 218 BC) =

Roman general and statesman (died 211 BC)

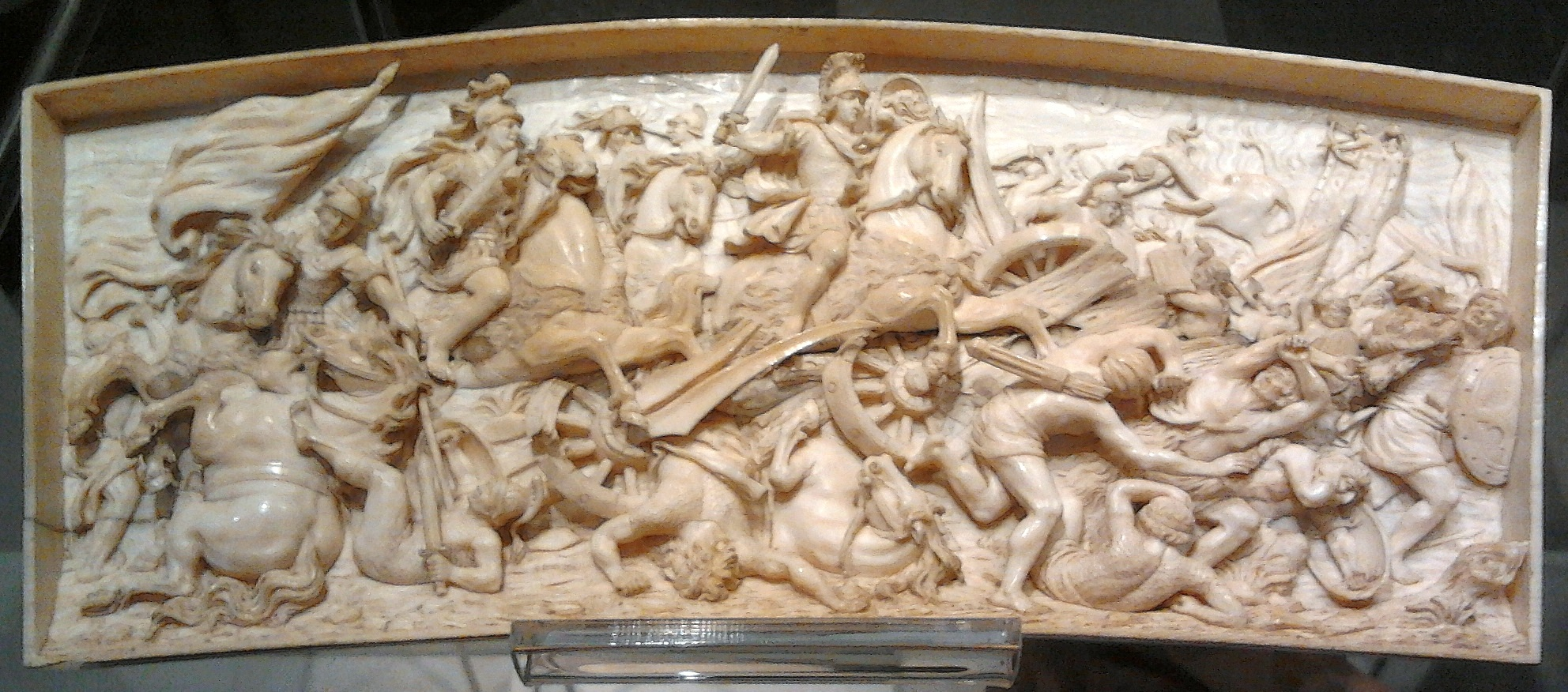
- Battle of Hannibal and Scipio (Alexander's victory over Poros), by Ignaz Elhafen, Warsaw Royal Castle

Roman consul
- In office 15 March 218 BC – 14 March 217 BC Serving with Tiberius Sempronius Longus
- Preceded by: Lucius Aemilius Paullus; Marcus Livius Salinator
- Succeeded by: Gnaeus Servilius Geminus; Gaius Flaminius

Personal details
- Died: 211 BC
- Cause of death: Killed in action (impaled by a spear in his left side)
- Spouse: Pomponia m. 237 BC
- Children: Scipio Africanus; Lucius Cornelius Scipio Asiaticus
- Occupation: General and politician
- Military career
- Allegiance: Roman Republic
- Conflicts: Second Punic War; Battle of Ticinus (WIA); Battle of the Upper Baetis †

Publius Cornelius Scipio (died 211 BC) was a general and statesman of the Roman Republic and the father of Scipio Africanus.

A member of the Cornelia gens, Scipio served as consul in 218 BC, the first year of the Second Punic War. At the outbreak of the war, he was ordered to conduct the war effort in the Iberian Peninsula and confront Hannibal himself, while his fellow consul Tiberius Sempronius Longus was allocated Sicily and Africa. Scipio was given permission to recruit two Roman legions, (Note: Each consisting of 4,000 infantry and 300 cavalry) 14,000 allied infantry, 1,600 allied cavalry and given 60 quinqueremes. He sailed with his army from Pisa with the intention of confronting Hannibal in Hispania. Stopping at Massalia (today Marseille) to replenish his supplies, he was shocked to discover that Hannibal's army had moved from Hispania and was crossing the Rhône. Scipio disembarked his army and marched to confront Hannibal, who, by now, had moved on. Returning to the fleet, he entrusted the command of his army to his brother Gnaeus Cornelius Scipio Calvus and sent him off to Hispania to carry on with the originally intended mission. Scipio returned to Italy to take command of the troops fighting in Cisalpine Gaul.

On his return to Italy, he advanced at once to meet Hannibal. In a sharp cavalry engagement near the Ticinus, a tributary of the Po river, he was defeated and severely wounded. In December of the same year, he again witnessed the complete defeat of the Roman army at the Trebia, when his fellow consul Tiberius Sempronius Longus allegedly insisted on fighting against his advice. (Note: The earliest historical source was by the Greek historian Polybius, who became an intimate of Scipio's grandson and was seemingly biased in favour of the Scipio family. The other major account was written in the following century by the Roman historian Livy, who also expressed bias in favour of certain aristocratic families.)

Despite the military defeats, he still retained the confidence of the Roman people; his term of command was extended and the following year found him in Hispania with his brother Calvus, winning victories over the Carthaginians and strengthening Rome's position in the Iberian peninsula. He continued the Iberian campaigns until 211, when he was killed during the defeat of his army at the upper Baetis river by the Carthaginians and their Iberian allies under Indibilis and Mandonius. That same year, Calvus and his army were destroyed at Ilorci near Carthago Nova. The details of these campaigns are not completely known, but it seems that the ultimate defeat and death of the two Scipiones was due to the desertion of the Celtiberians, who were bribed by Hasdrubal Barca, Hannibal's brother.

At his funeral, a certain Lucius Marcius was giving a speech when suddenly, his head spontaneously caught on fire. This has been interpreted as a divine message to Scipio's soldiers for them to avenge his death. Pliny the Elder is the sole ancient source for this account.

The son of Lucius Cornelius Scipio, he was the father of Publius Cornelius Scipio Africanus (the elder), and of Lucius Cornelius Scipio Asiaticus.

== See also ==
- Scipio-Paullus-Gracchus family tree

Political offices
Preceded by L. Aemilius Paulus; Marcus Livius	Consul of Rome; 218 BC; With: Tiberius Sempronius Longus	Succeeded by Gn. Servilius Geminus; Gaius Flaminius
