= Tiberius Sempronius Longus (consul 218 BC) =

Ancient Roman politician and general

Roman consul
- In office 15 March 218 BC – 14 March 217 BC Serving with Publius Cornelius Scipio
- Preceded by: Lucius Aemilius Paullus; Marcus Livius Salinator
- Succeeded by: Gnaeus Servilius Geminus; Gaius Flaminius

Personal details
- Born: c. 260 BC
- Occupation: General and politician
Tiberius Sempronius Longus
- Military career
- Allegiance: Roman Republic
- Conflicts: Second Punic War; Battle of the Trebia; Capture of Malta; Battle of Grumentum

Tiberius Sempronius Longus (c. 260 BC – unknown) was a Roman consul during the Second Punic War and a contemporary of Publius Cornelius Scipio (father of Scipio Africanus). In 219 BC, Sempronius and the elder Scipio were elected as consuls for 218 BC. At the outbreak of the war in 218 BC, he was ordered to conduct the war effort in Sicily and Africa, while Scipio was sent to the Iberian Peninsula to attack Hannibal himself. Sempronius was allocated two Roman legions, 16,000 allied infantry, 1,800 allied cavalry, 160 quinqueremes and 20 lighter vessels. As soon as his army was assembled he moved his forces to Sicily. Striking from Lilybaeum Sempronius captured Malta from the Carthaginians.

Shortly thereafter, with Scipio wounded and pursued by Hannibal's forces after the Battle of Ticinus, the Senate sent for Tiberius Sempronius Longus. Upon his arrival in December, and reportedly against Scipio's advice, Sempronius Longus led an ambitious attack at the Battle of the Trebia. His army charged into a trap and was enveloped by the forces of Hannibal's brother, Mago. Although it was a crushing Roman defeat, Tiberius Sempronius Longus and a force of 10,000 infantrymen fought their way through the rear Carthaginian lines and to safety.

In January 217 BC Sempronius Longus returned to Rome to oversee the elections for the new consuls. He was succeeded by Gaius Flaminius and returned to his army at their winter encampment.

In 215 BC, Sempronius fought Hanno at Grumentum. His army killed 2,000 enemy men and captured 280 more, pushing Hanno out of Lucania back to Bruttium and allowing the towns of Vercellium, Vescellium, and Sicilinum to be recaptured for Rome.

He is the father of Tiberius Sempronius Longus, the consul of 194 BC.

Political offices
Preceded by Lucius Aemilius Paulus and Marcus Livius Salinator	Consul of the Roman Republic with Publius Cornelius Scipio; 218 BC	Succeeded by Gnaeus Servilius Geminus and Gaius Flaminius and Marcus Atilius Regulus (Suffect)
