= 217 BC =

217 BC in various calendars
Gregorian calendar	217 BC; CCXVII BC
Ab urbe condita	537
Ancient Egypt era	XXXIII dynasty, 107
Pharaoh	Ptolemy IV Philopator, 5
Ancient Greek Olympiad (summer)	140th Olympiad, year 4
Assyrian calendar	4534
Balinese saka calendar	N/A
Bengali calendar	−810 – −809
Berber calendar	734
Buddhist calendar	328
Burmese calendar	−854
Byzantine calendar	5292–5293
Chinese calendar	癸未年 (Water Goat); 2481 or 2274 — to — 甲申年 (Wood Monkey); 2482 or 2275
Coptic calendar	−500 – −499
Discordian calendar	950
Ethiopian calendar	−224 – −223
Hebrew calendar	3544–3545
- Hindu calendars
Vikram Samvat	−160 – −159
Shaka Samvat	N/A
Kali Yuga	2884–2885
Holocene calendar	9784
Iranian calendar	838 BP – 837 BP
Islamic calendar	864 BH – 863 BH
Javanese calendar	N/A
Julian calendar	N/A
Korean calendar	2117
Minguo calendar	2128 before ROC 民前2128年
Nanakshahi calendar	−1684
Seleucid era	95/96 AG
Thai solar calendar	326–327
Tibetan calendar	ཆུ་མོ་ལུག་ལོ་ (female Water-Sheep) −90 or −471 or −1243 — to — ཤིང་ཕོ་སྤྲེ་ལོ་ (male Wood-Monkey) −89 or −470 or −1242

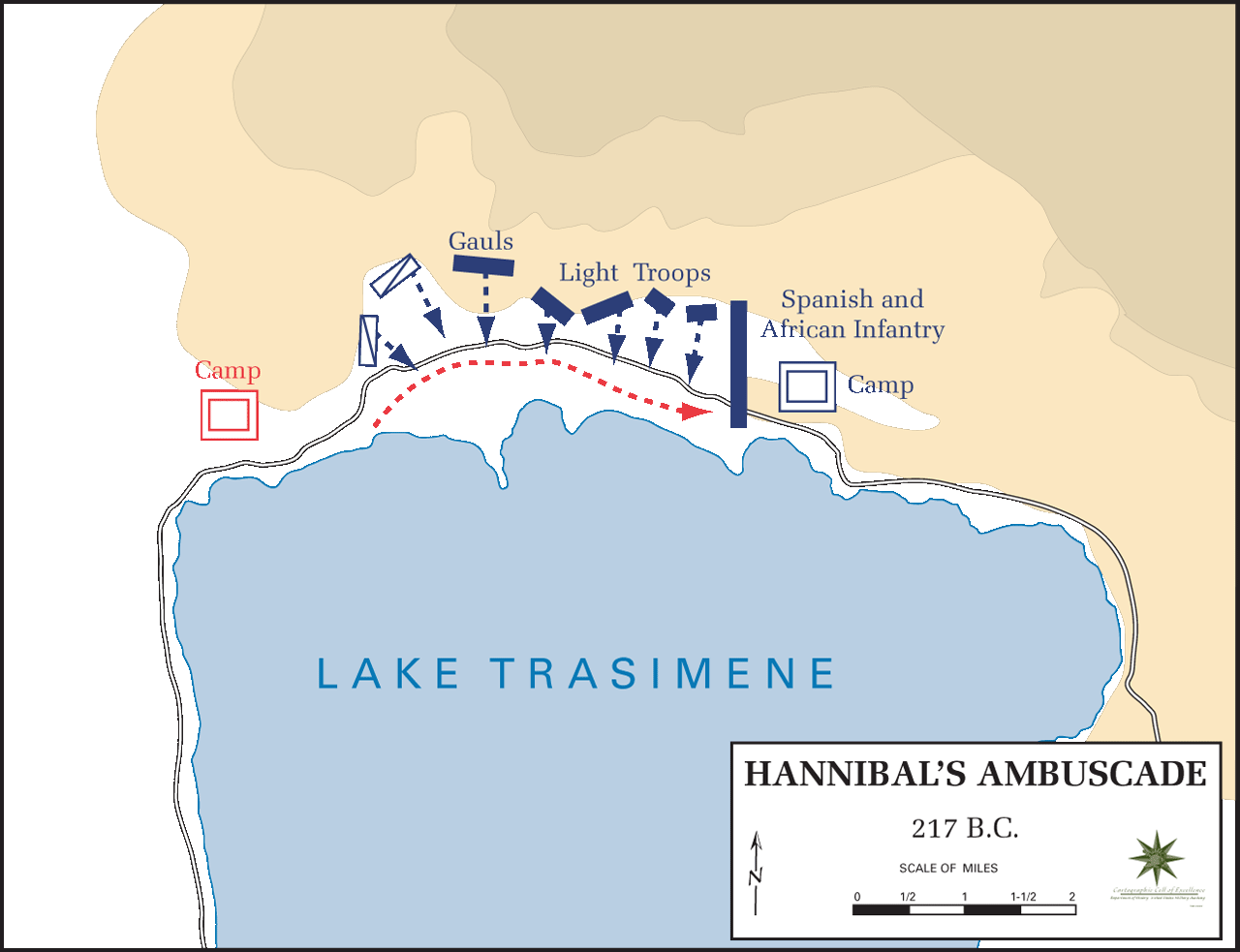
The Battle of Lake Trasimene

Year 217 BC was a year of the pre-Julian Roman calendar. At the time it was known as the Year of the Consulship of Geminus and Flaminius/Regulus (or, less frequently, year 537 Ab urbe condita). The denomination 217 BC for this year has been used since the early medieval period, when the Anno Domini calendar era became the prevalent method in Europe for naming years.

== Events ==
=== By place ===
==== Roman Republic ====
- Gaius Flaminius is re-elected consul with Gnaeus Servilius Geminus, in what is considered to be a rebuke of the Senate's prosecution of the war. Flaminius raises new legions and marches north to meet the Carthaginian general Hannibal.
- Hannibal advances to the Arno River and then outmanoeuvres the army of Gaius Flaminius at Arretium and reaches Faesulae (modern Fiesole) and Perugia.
- June 21 – On the northern shore of Lake Trasimene, in Umbria, Hannibal's troops all but annihilate Gaius Flaminius' army in the Battle of Lake Trasimene, killing thousands (including Flaminius) and driving others to drown in the lake. Reinforcements of about 4,000 cavalry from Ariminum under the praetor, Gaius Centenius, are intercepted before they arrive and are also destroyed. The Carthaginian troops then march on Rome.
- Gaius Flaminius' supporters in the Senate begin to lose power to the more aristocratic factions as the Romans fear Hannibal is about to besiege their city. The Senate appoint Quintus Fabius Maximus Verrucosus as dictator.
- Quintus Fabius Maximus begins his strategy of "delay". This involves avoiding a set battle with the Carthaginians and creating a "scorched earth" area around Hannibal's army. Manoeuvring among the hills, where Hannibal's cavalry is ineffective, Fabius cuts off his enemy's supplies and harasses Hannibal's forces incessantly. Fabius gains the name Cunctator (The Delayer) for this strategy.
- Hannibal ravages Apulia and Campania; meanwhile the delaying tactics of Quintus Fabius Maximus' army allows only skirmishes to occur between the two armies.
- Fabius' delaying policy becomes increasingly unpopular in Rome, and Fabius is compelled to return to Rome to defend his actions under the guise of observing some religious obligations. Marcus Minucius Rufus, the master of horse, is left in command and manages to catch the Carthaginians off guard near their camp in Geronium and inflicts severe losses on them in a large skirmish. This "victory" causes the Romans, disgruntled with Fabius, to elevate Minucius to the equal rank of dictator with Fabius.
- Minucius takes command of half the army and camps separately from Fabius near Geronium. Hannibal, informed of this development, lays an elaborate trap, which draws out Minucius and his army and then Hannibal attacks it from all sides. The timely arrival of Fabius with the other half of the army enables Minucius to escape after a severe mauling. After the battle, Minucius turns over his army to Fabius and resumes the duties of Master of Horse.
- Carthaginians defeat the Romans at Lake Trasimene; at the Trebia River and at the Ticinus River

==== Egypt ====
- June 22 – Egyptian native hoplites under Ptolemy IV crush the Seleucid army under Antiochus III in the Battle of Raphia near Gaza. The realization of their military importance leads to demands by native Egyptians for greater privileges and so to the development of racial difficulties which will weaken the Ptolemy dynasty in the future.
- Although holding the initiative after the Battle of Raphia, Ptolemy IV, on his chief minister Sosibius' advice, negotiates a peace, and the Seleucid army withdraws from Coele Syria. Antiochus III gives up all his conquests except the city of Seleucia-in-Pieria.

==== Greece ====
- Philip V of Macedon, continuing his war with the Aetolian League lays siege to Phthiotic Thebes, captures it and sells the inhabitants into slavery.
- Learning of Hannibal's victory over the Romans at Lake Trasimene and seeing a chance to recover his Illyrian kingdom from the Romans, Demetrius of Pharos immediately advises Philip V to make peace with the Aetolians, and turn his attentions toward Illyria and Italy. Philip, at once begins negotiations with the Aetolians. At a conference on the coast near Naupactus, Philip meets the Aetolian leaders and a peace treaty is concluded, ending the three-year-long "Social War".

==== Spain ====
- Publius Cornelius Scipio is sent with reinforcements by Rome to Spain as proconsul. In a naval battle on the Ebro River at Tarraco, the Carthaginian general Hasdrubal's fleet is largely destroyed by a daring surprise Roman attack led by Publius Cornelius Scipio and his brother Gnaeus Cornelius Scipio Calvus. As a result, the Romans are able to strengthen their hold on the Ebro River region.

== Births ==
- Xin Zhui, a Han dynasty noblewoman

== Deaths ==
- Arsaces I, King of Parthia
- Gaius Flaminius, Roman consul and general
- Pinnes (also Pinneus or Pineus), son of Agron, king of Illyria, and Agron's first wife Triteuta
