= Musée des Beaux-Arts de Béziers =

Museum in Béziers, France

Coordinates: 43°20′29″N 3°12′40″E

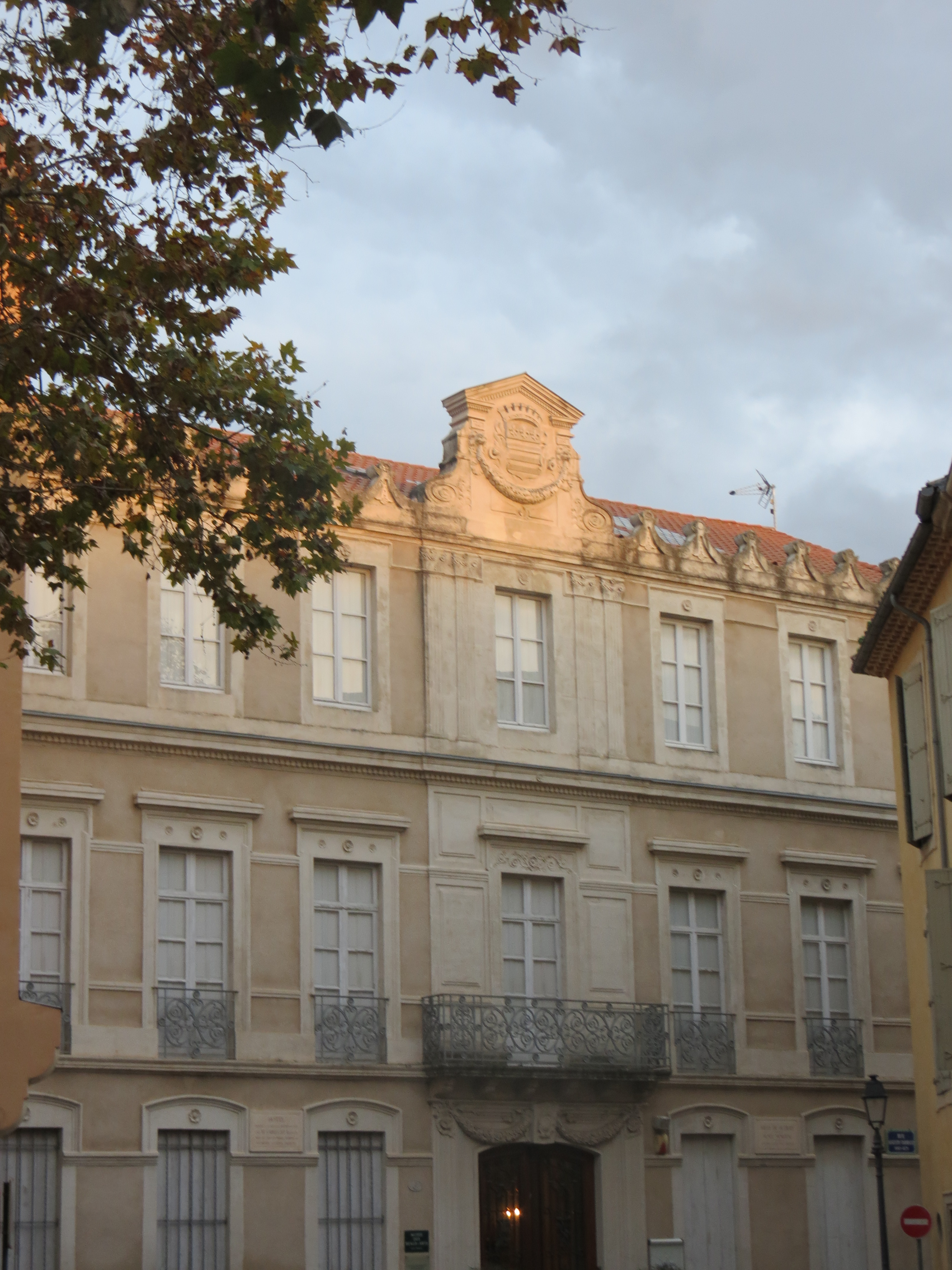
The museum

The Musée des Beaux-Arts is a museum in Béziers, founded by the town's archaeological, scientific and literary society and opened to the public in the Hôtel de ville in 1859.

It moved to Auguste Fabrégat's hôtel particulier, left to the town by him in 1879. In 1966 Gustave Fayet's family gave their hôtel particulier at 9 rue du Capus to the town and early in the 1980s that building became an annexe to the museum, mainly housing the works by the sculptor Jean-Antoine Injalbert which were left to the town by his widow in 1934.

By 2030 an art and history museum will occupy the former episcopal palace after it was vacated by the Palais de Justice.

== Collections ==
=== Hôtel Fayet ===
It was given the subtitle of 'Maisons des Illustres' in 2019 in memory of Fayet and houses 19th century paintings and sculptures as well as the Injalbert works.

=== Hôtel Fabrégat ===
Closed since 2018, the hôtel Fabrégat has become a conservation and restoration centre for paintings from the 15th century to the modern era, 18th and 19th century drawings and Jean Moulin's collection of modern art, donated by Laure Moulin in 1975. Works on show in that building before its closure included:

- Richard Parkes Bonington : Sea Port on the Breton Coast and Seascape
- Sébastien Bourdon : The Death of Dido ; Portrait of Queen Christina of Sweden.
- Alexandre Cabanel, Orestes, The Druidess (1868), Cleopatra, study for Cleopatra Testing Poisons
- Gaston Cugnenc : The Martyrdom of St Stephen
- Giorgio de Chirico : Composition with Self-Portrait (1926)
- Alexandre Colin : Christopher Columbus before the Council of Salamanca (1843 salon)
- Camille Corot : Marsh with Five Cows
- Michiel Coxcie : Portrait of a Woman with a White Headdress
- Michel-François Dandré-Bardon : Sophonisba Drinking Poison
- Eugène Delacroix : Alberthe de Rubempré, the Artist's Cousin, as Catherine of Alexandria
- Hippolyte Camille Delpy : Farm near Bois-le-Roi
- Domenichino : Portrait of Pope Gregory XV and his Nephew Cardinal Ludovico Ludovisi
- Marcel Féguide : Orpheus and Eurydice Cycle (1928)
- Jan Fyt : Wild Cat Sniffing out Game
- Othon Friesz : The Port of Honfleur
- Orazio Gentileschi : The Martyrdom of Saint Sebastian
- Théodore Géricault : Portrait of a Woman or La Grosse Suzanne (1817-1818)
- Théodore Géricault : Study of a Grey Horse
- Charles Labor : Self-Portrait, Covered Square in Béziers, The plaine de Tarassac under Snow, The plaine du Rebaut at Sunset, The Town and Mills of Béziers, The Parthenon, Orientalist Landscape and The Beach at Vendres and the Temple of Venus in the 1st century of Our Era.
- Pinchus Krémègne : Blonde Nude
- Jean-Paul Laurens : William the Conqueror's Funeral Procession
- Philippe-Jacques de Loutherbourg : La Gravière
- Anton Raphael Mengs : Portrait of Pope Clement XIII
- Jan Miel : Rest in the Fields (1642)
- Frederik de Moucheron : Village Street (1652)
- Joseph Parrocel : Battle between Moors and Castillians
- Fernand Pelez : The Death of Emperor Commodus (1879 salon)
- Jean Pillement : Shipwreck Scene
- Guido Reni : Dido's Farewell to Aeneas ; Holy Conversation.
- Giulio Romano : Madonna and Child (after Raphael)
- Jacques Stella : The Presentation in the Temple
- Léopold Survage : Composition (1915)
- Joseph-Noël Sylvestre : The Death of Seneca (1875), Ducarius the Gaul Beheads the Roman General Flaminius at the Battle of Trasimene (1882)
- Maurice Utrillo : The Agile Rabbit (1938)
- Horace Vernet : Ram's Head
- Joseph-Marie Vien : Lansquenet.

That building also housed works by Edgar Degas, Raoul Dufy, Francisco de Herrera the Elder, Eugène Isabey, Théodore Rousseau * Auguste Rodin, Ker Xavier Roussel, Chaïm Soutine, Giovanni Francesco Romanelli, Suzanne Valadon and the orientalist painter Odette du Bosch.
