= Ducarius =

Gallic noble

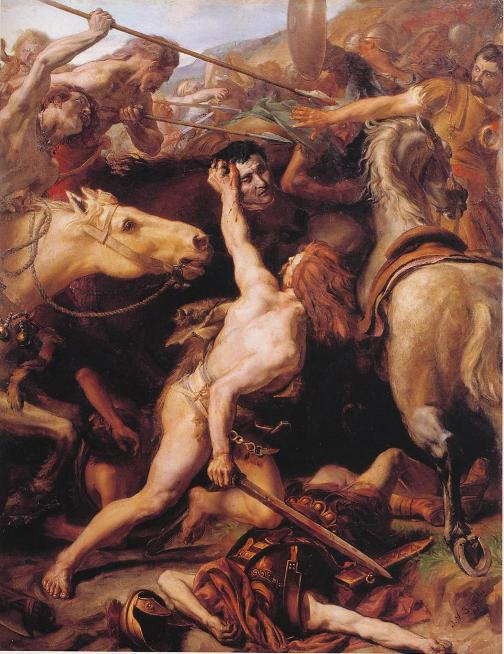
Ducarius Beheads Flaminius at the Battle of Lake Trasimene (1882) by Joseph-Noël Sylvestre (Musée des Beaux-Arts, Béziers)

Ducarius was a Gallic nobleman from the Insubres who fought under Hannibal at the Battle of Lake Trasimene on 21 June 217 BC, during the Second Punic War, and, according to Livy, slew the Roman commander Gaius Flaminius. As described by Livy:

For almost three hours the fighting went on; everywhere a desperate struggle was kept up, but it raged with greater fierceness round the consul. He was followed by the pick of his army, and wherever he saw his men hard pressed and in difficulties he at once went to their help. Distinguished by his armour he was the object of the enemy's fiercest attacks, which his comrades did their utmost to repel, until an Insubrian horseman who knew the consul by sight — his name was Ducarius — cried out to his countrymen, "Here is the man who slew our legions and laid waste our city and our lands! I will offer him in sacrifice to the shades of my foully murdered countrymen." Digging spurs into his horse he charged into the dense masses of the enemy, and slew an armour-bearer who threw himself in the way as he galloped up lance in rest, and then plunged his lance into the consul.

— Livy, Ab Urbe Condita Libri, 22.6

Little else is known of his life, and whether he survived the battle.
