= Centenia gens =

The gens Centenia was a Roman family in the time of the Second Punic War. It is best known from two individuals, Gaius Centenius, propraetor in 217 B.C., whose cavalry force was defeated by Maharbal, and Marcus Centenius Penula, a veteran centurion distinguished for his bravery, who was granted a force to deal with Hannibal in Lucania, and was likewise defeated in 212.

== See also ==
- List of Roman gentes
