= Gaius Centenius =

Gaius Centenius (fl. 3rd century BC) was a propraetor of the Roman army. He fought at the Second Punic War, and was defeated at the Battle of Lake Trasimene.

According to Polybius, the Roman consul Gnaeus Servilius Geminus, who was en route to meet with his co-consul Gaius Flaminius stationed at Ariminum, had sent his cavalry ahead led by Gaius Centenius. After his victory at Lake Trasimene, Hannibal sent Maharbal (leading a detachment of spearmen and cavalry), who successfully intercepted Centenius and his detachment of 4000 cavalry. Maharbal's force killed half of Centenius's men. The surviving Roman cavalry were followed to a hill, where they eventually surrendered.

Titus Livius gives little information, except that the defeat occurred in Umbria. Appian says he was sent to the Plestine lake to occupy the routes for the Romans troops at the valley and was subsequently defeated by Hannibal. Zonaras says he was ambushed near Spoletium.

== See also ==
- Centenia (gens).

== Bibliography ==
- Bradley, Guy Jolyon (2000). Ancient Umbria : state, culture, and identity in central Italy from the Iron Age to the Augustan era. Oxford: Oxford University Press. p. 148. ISBN 9780198153016.
