= Maharbal =

Numidian army commander

- Native name: 𐤌𐤄𐤓𐤁𐤏𐤋
- Allegiance: Carthage
- Branch: Numidian cavalry
- Rank: Commander in chief
- Conflicts: Barcid conquest of Hispania Second Punic War: Siege of Saguntum; Battle of Ticinus; Battle of Trasimene; Battle of Cannae; Battle of Casilinum †

Maharbal (Punic: 𐤌𐤄𐤓𐤁𐤏𐤋, mhrbʿl; Ancient Greek: Μαάρβας; fl. 3rd century BC) was a Numidian army commander in charge of the cavalry under Hannibal and his second-in-command during the Second Punic War. Maharbal was a very close friend to Hannibal and admired him greatly. He was often critical to the battlefield success of Carthage over Rome. Throughout his Italian campaign Hannibal maintained numerical superiority in cavalry, and thus relied upon them and Maharbal to give his army an advantage.

Maharbal is best known for what he possibly (Note: More recently, scholars have pointed out that the story derives from a notoriously corrupt and therefore unreliable manuscript of Livy, that Cannae was too far away to make a quick march on Rome feasible, that Hannibal's army was exhausted and in need of recovery (and resupply), and that Maharbal himself may not have been there. Livy's accounts of Cannae itself have been called into question; among other things, he attributed the Roman defeat partly to the rash behavior of the consul Gaius Terentius Varro, but internal evidence (from Livy himself) shows that the Senate and People of Rome did not blame Varro for the defeat, and that Lucius Aemilius Paullus was more likely to have been in command. In short, Livy is notorious for favouring the aristocratic and Senatorial party in his histories, and not an entirely reliable source.) said during a conversation with Hannibal immediately following the Battle of Cannae. According to Livy, Maharbal strongly urged an immediate march on the city of Rome. Hannibal responded by saying "I commend your zeal, but I need time to weigh the plan which you propose." Maharbal then replied, "Assuredly, no one man has been blessed with all God's gifts. You, Hannibal, know how to gain a victory; you do not know how to use it." The Latin for the last sentence of the conversation is: "Vincere scis, Hannibal; victoria uti nescis."

== Military accomplishments ==
Maharbal was a son of Himilco. He was first mentioned as commanding the besieging force at the siege of Saguntum (219 BC) in the absence of the commander-in-chief Hannibal. According to Livy, he carried on the operations with such vigour that Hannibal's absence was hardly felt. After Hannibal arrived in Italy, he was sent with a body of cavalry to ravage the plains near the Po in northern Italy. He was recalled to join his commander for the battle on the Ticinus (218 BC) where the consul Publius Cornelius Scipio was seriously wounded and his son, Scipio Africanus, first made an appearance in Roman history.

== Battle of Lake Trasimene (217 BC) ==
At Lake Trasimene, 6000 Romans who had escaped from the battle occupied a strong position in one of the neighbouring villages. These survivors were induced to lay down their arms, on receiving from Maharbal a promise of safety. Hannibal, however, refused to ratify the capitulation, alleging that Maharbal had exceeded his powers. He dismissed, without ransom, all those men who belonged to the Italian allies, and only retained the Roman citizens as prisoners of war. Maharbal, despite being a cavalry commander, led Iberian skirmishers and infantry to round up the Romans who had survived the battle.

The consul Gnaeus Servilius Geminus, who was en route to meet with his co-consul Gaius Flaminius, had sent his cavalry ahead, led by the praetor Gaius Centenius. After the battle of Trasimene, Maharbal (leading a detachment of spear-men and cavalry) successfully intercepted Centinius and his detachment of 4000 cavalry. When Maharbal's force met with Centenius half of the Romans were killed, and the rest retreated. The surviving Roman cavalry were followed to a hill where they eventually surrendered.

After this battle, Maharbal was apparently sent with the Numidian cavalry to ravage the rich Falernian plains.

== Battle of Cannae (216 BC) ==
Maharbal's role in this famous battle is uncertain. Roman historians are themselves divided over his presence or absence, and the most reliable of them, Polybius, does not mention his presence at all. (Note: Polybius's omission of his name is probably most significant, because he was the closest in age to the survivors of Cannae, and he was close friends with Scipio Aemilianus, the grandson of Lucius Aemilius Paullus, one of the consuls who died at Cannae.) According to Livy, Maharbal commanded the right wing of the Carthaginian army at the battle of Cannae, contradicting Polybius's claim that the right wing was commanded by Hanno, son of Bomilcar. Appian agrees with Polybius, however, and assigns Maharbal on that occasion the command of the reserve of cavalry instead.

Livy claims that immediately after the victory, Maharbal urged Hannibal to push on at once with his cavalry upon Rome itself, promising him that if he did so, within five days he should sup in the Capitol. On the refusal of his commander to do so, Maharbal is said to have observed that Hannibal knew indeed how to gain victories, but not how to use them. However, modern historians judge Hannibal's decision more reasonably than did William Smith and his contemporaries. They point to the fact that Hannibal's army was exhausted, that Rome was able to raise fresh legions, that Rome itself was defended by formidable walls, and that Hannibal had no siege machinery.

== After Cannae ==
Maharbal's fate after the Battle of Casilinum, is not known. A person of that name is mentioned by Frontinus as employed by the Carthaginians against some African tribes that had rebelled. However, it is not clear if this is the same Maharbal as Hannibal's cavalry commander. He may have died around the time of the Siege of Casilinum, or shortly thereafter.
