= Joseph-Noël Sylvestre =

French painter (1847–1926)

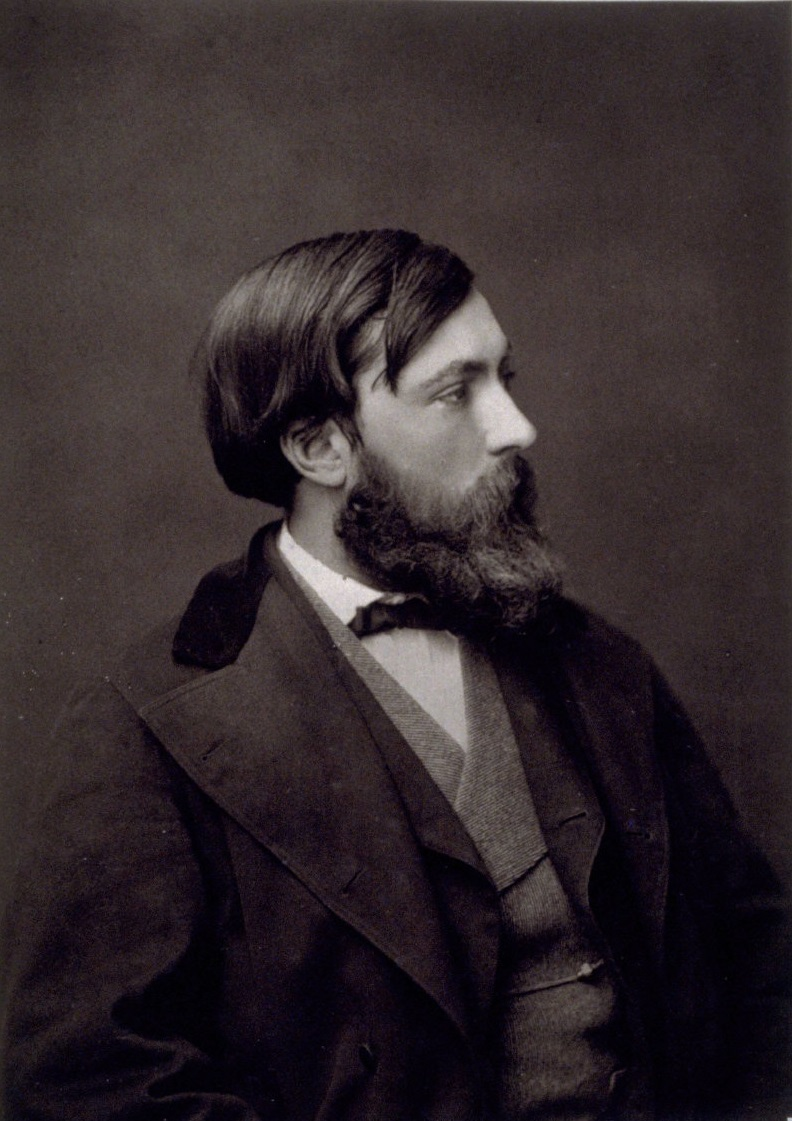
Photograph of Sylvestre taken sometime between 1876 and 1894

Joseph-Noël Sylvestre (24 June 1847 – 29 October 1926) was a French artist, notable for his studies of classic scenes from antiquity.

== Life ==
Joseph-Noël Sylvestre was born on 24 June 1847 in Béziers in South-West France.

He began his training as an artist first in Toulouse under Thomas Couture, then at the École des Beaux-Arts in Paris under Alexandre Cabanel. He was an exponent of the romantic Academic art style, also known as art pompier (fireman's art), examples of which are the Death of Seneca (1875), The Gaul Ducar decapitates the Roman general Flaminius at the Battle of Trasimene (1882), The Sack of Rome by the barbarians in 410 (1890) and François Rude working on the Arc de Triomphe (1893).

== Gallery ==
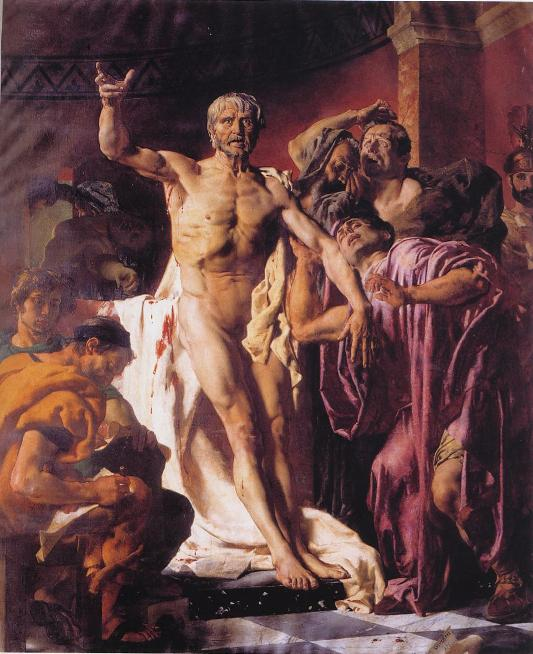
The Death of Seneca (1875)

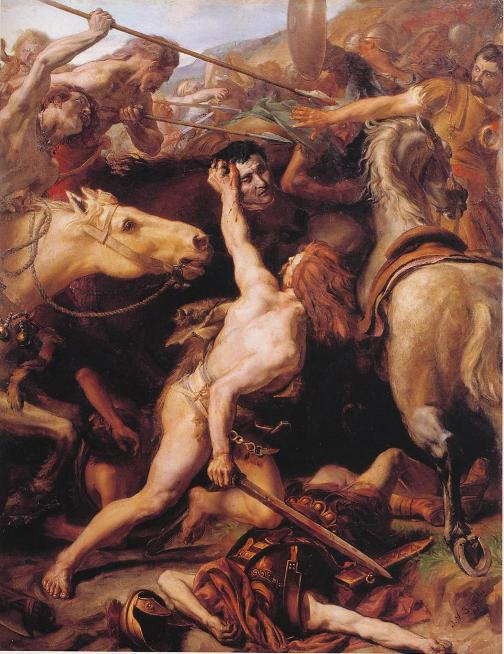
The Gaul Ducar decapitates the Roman general Gaius Flaminius at the Battle of Lake Trasimene (1882)

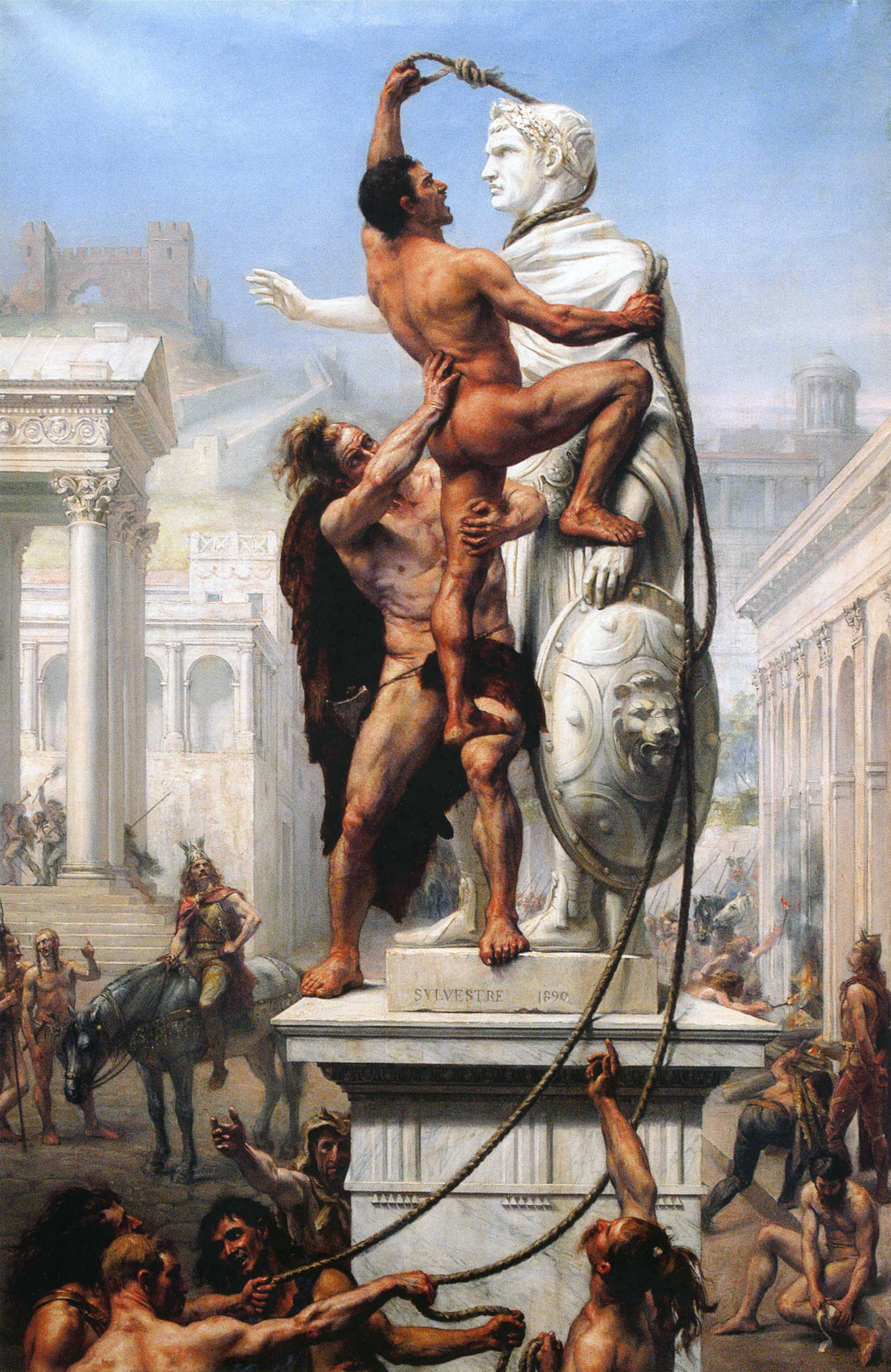
The Sack of Rome in 410 by the Barbarians (1890).

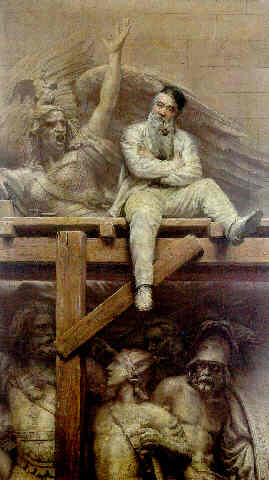
François Rude working on the Arc de Triomphe (1893).

== Sources ==
- This article began as a translation of its French equivalent.
