= Gaius Flaminius (consul 223 BC) =

3rd century BC Roman politician and general

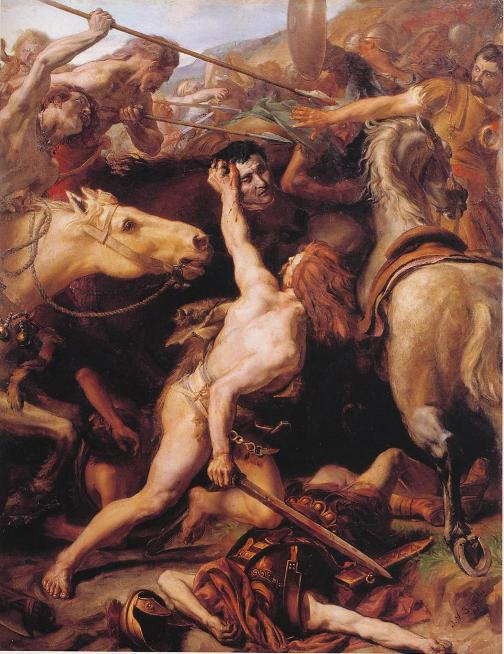
- Ducarius decapitates Flaminius at the Battle of Lake Trasimene, by Joseph-Noël Sylvestre. Béziers (Languedoc-Roussillon), Musée des beaux-Arts.
- Born: c. 275 BC
- Died: 24 June 217 BC, April on the Julian calendar Lake Trasimene, Italy
- Cause of death: Killed in action
- Office: Consul (223, 217 BC); Censor (220 BC); Tribune of the plebs (232 BC)
- Children: Gaius Flaminius

Military service
- Battles/wars: Battle of Lake Trasimene

Gaius Flaminius (c. 275 BC – 24 June 217 BC) was a leading Roman politician in the third century BC. Flaminius served as consul twice, in 223 and 217. He is notable for being the first Roman governor of Sicily, the Lex Flaminia, a land reform bill passed in 232, the construction of the Circus Flaminius in 221, the construction of the Via Flaminia, and his death at the hands of Hannibal's army at the Battle of Lake Trasimene in 217, during the Second Punic War. Flaminius is celebrated by ancient sources as being a skilled orator and a man possessed of great piety, strength, and determination. He is, however, simultaneously criticised by ancient writers such as Cicero and Livy for his popular policies and disregard of Roman traditions, particularly during the terms of his tribunate and second consulship.

== Tribunate and the Lex Flaminia, 232 BC ==
Flaminius was elected as tribune of the plebs in 232 BC. Cicero writes that Flaminius was an accomplished orator before the people, a skill that likely helped him achieve the tribunate. During his term, Flaminius proposed the Lex Flaminia de Agro Gallico et Piceno viritim dividundo, a controversial agrarian law proposing the settlement of Roman citizens in the Ager Gallicus Picenus lands around Picenum and Ariminum, made available by Rome's defeat of their previous occupants, the Senones, in 283. It is unclear from the ancient sources why the Ager Gallicus Picenus was chosen for the project.

Polybius suggests that the law caused problems with the Boii as the Romans began settling near their territory, eventually leading to the Gallic rebellion in 225. Approximately 2,580 square kilometres had been made ager publicus following the Roman victory, although not all the available territory was distributed under this law. Some was in fact privatised prior to Flaminius' reform. The land was reasonably valuable as it could produce large quantities of wine. It is not clear from the ancient sources how many people were settled there, although estimates suggest approximately 19,000 citizens, not including their families. It would have been problematic to transport and settle this many people to a relatively distant area from Rome so scholars have argued that transportation must have been made by sea, as it would have been difficult to do so by land. This transportation has been linked to the Roman conflict with Illyrian pirates as raids now directly affected Roman citizens.

Ancient sources describe resistance from the senate to these measures including opposition from Quintus Fabius Maximus, a rival of Flaminius, although Cicero notes that Spurius Carvilius, Fabius Maximus' colleague for his second consulship, did not join the opposition. Valerius Maximus writes that Flaminius persisted in pushing it through despite threats and pleas from the senate, and against the possibility of an army being levied against him if he continued. Later Roman historians use the opposition to the law from the senate to portray Flaminius as a populares style leader, alienated from the senate in the tradition of the Gracchi, although this narrative is challenged by modern historians.

=== Controversy in passing the Lex Flaminia ===
One tradition suggests that as Flaminius was proposing his agrarian law he was dragged from the rostra by his father. Cicero writes that Flaminius' father was subsequently tried for maiestas (diminishing the majesty of the Roman people) for this action, but argued that he was exerting his authority as a father over a son rather than a citizen acting against an elected tribune of the plebs. Valerius Maximus follows this tradition, listing Flaminius as an example of male piety for respecting his father's private authority over him as he allowed his father to remove him from the rostra when nothing else would sway him. Valerius Maximus claims the crowd respected Flaminius' pietas in this event and does not mention the subsequent maiestas trial described by Cicero. This has led some modern scholars to argue that the law was never passed, although contemporary sources indicate that it did.

=== Scholarly explanations for senatorial opposition to the Lex Flaminia ===
Early scholarly thinking compared Flaminius with Tiberius Gracchus as they both pushed through land laws against the wishes of the senate. This led to the view that the senatorial opposition stemmed from an economic motivation to keep this land solely for the nobiles who had been exploiting it since its capture, and the portrayal of Flaminius as a democratic leader campaigning for the common people against the greedy nobiles. Fraccaro rejected this explanation and began looking for a political motivation instead, arguing that there was senatorial opposition as the law proposed a new style of settlement. Previously colonists kept their Roman citizenship if the land was connected to the ager Romanus, as otherwise Rome founded a Latin colony and colonists lost Roman citizenship, while through this law colonists kept their citizenship despite the distance from Rome. Meyer argues against this, citing citizenship given to other peoples including the Sabines and Picentes despite their distance from Rome.

Corbett proposes instead that Rome had a manpower problem, and the senate was therefore unwilling to distribute citizens so far away to a place already sufficiently guarded. Feig Vishnia argues against this idea as the people settled had lost land and therefore were ineligible for the army, and so by giving them land Rome would increase its manpower possibilities and protect the border with the Boii, an idea supported by the fact that the area became a key source of manpower in the Second Punic War.

Develin claims that the law never passed due to the intervention of Flaminius' father, and that the senate settled Latin colonies there to prevent complaints from the potential settlers, but no names of these colonies are found in the ancient evidence and his argument is not supported by the ancient evidence on the law. He also argues that it impossible to reconstruct factional support within the senate for the law.

Kramer however suggests that Flaminius was manipulating factional rivalries by aligning with the Aemilii to gain an advantage for the plebs he hoped to settle. He views choice of territory as part of an aggressive policy against Gallic threat advocated by the Aemilii who saw the Gauls as potential allies for Hannibal, and opposed by the Fabii.

Cassola argues that the law was opposed for multiple reasons, first because both senators and publicans would lose economically if land was distributed and also because there was conflict in the senate between a liberal faction supporting southern expansion, facilitating economic and cultural relations with Greek territories, and a conservative faction in favour of maintaining the agrarian nature of Rome. He sees Flaminius as champion of the rural plebs against the urban plebs, opposed to expansion beyond Italy. Yavetz similarly asserts that Flaminius is a man with his own faction, opposed to the senatorial aristocracy, and in 232 he may have been supported by the Aemilii-Scipiones on political grounds.

Scholars have argued that opposition from the senate was due to the possibility of war with the Gauls since a settlement near Gallic territory may have seemed aggressive. This is what Polybius argues caused war with the Gauls seven years later. Roselaar also suggests that the Senones had not been completely eradicated and still occupied the land. Rome was already at war in several places and the senate may not have wanted to provoke another immediate conflict. Feig Vishnia also argues that this explains the conflict between Fabius and Flaminius as Fabius was cautious and did not want to give the Gauls an excuse for more conflict.

Roselaar argued that the senate was afraid that Flaminius would gain too much influence over the people for distributing the land to them, although Feig Vishnia points out that they were too far away to easily vote and settlers were only incorporated into two tribes which limited their political usefulness.

=== Support for the Lex Flaminia ===
Feig Vishnia argues that since the law was passed it must have had more support than indicated by the sources as no tribunician veto was used against it. The law was passed in the consulship of M. Aemilius Lepidus and he may have been a supporter as Flaminius had connections with the Aemilii. Spurius Carvilius Ruga's silence, mentioned by Cicero, is also significant in showing support among the senate for the law. L. Caecilius Metellus may have been another supporter as his eulogy describes him taking part in a commission appointed for land distribution and the only possible distribution in this period was Flaminius'. Flaminius' law may not have been as controversial as represented in later sources, as he was able to go on to hold the highest offices of the state and giving land to soldier veterans was simply a continuation of normal Roman policy.

=== Dating issues ===
There have been issues with the dating of his tribunate as Polybius places it in 232 in the consulship of Lepidus, while Cicero dates it to the second consulship of Fabius Maximus. Scholars have argued that Cicero's date is incorrect and instead that the opening months of Flaminius' tribunate would have overlapped with Fabius Maximus's first consulship allowing Fabius to officially oppose the law. Despite chronological problems with Cicero, Fieg Vishnia argues that Spurius Carvilius Ruga's silence, even while not the consul, is significant in showing support among the senate for the law.

== Praetorship, 227 BC ==
Flaminius was elected praetor for the year 227 BC. It was the first year in which four praetors were elected as Rome had gained overseas provinces, meaning Flaminius was made the first praetor of Sicily. Through his position in Sicily he was tasked with ruling over the Sicilians as praetors held imperium, which gave him the power to command an army and to quell any rebellions against Rome's administration in Sicily. He was also the magistrate who dealt with all judicial matters that arose in Sicily and regularly exchanged messages with the senate in Rome to resolve judicial matters. Flaminius' tenure in Sicily must have been viewed well by the provincials, since in 196 BC they sent his son one million measures of grain to bring back to Rome at two asses per measure during the latter's tenure as aedile as a sign of respect to his father. As a result of the influx of grain, Rome celebrated the Ludi Romani magnificently, repeated for two days to celebrate the ability of Flaminius to govern a foreign city state.

== First consulship, 223 BC ==
Flaminius as a novus homo secured election to the consulship in 223 BC alongside Publius Furius Philus, due to his popularity among the plebs. His term was plagued by unfavourable auspices from the outset. Plutarch records that at the time of the consular election, priests had proclaimed inauspicious and baleful omens from the flight of birds. During Flaminius' journey to Cisalpine Gaul, the river flowing through Picenum was running red with blood, and three moons were seen at Ariminum. Upon these grounds the senate sent letters commanding both consuls to return to the city with great speed, lay down their office, and forbade them from engaging the enemy. Before the senate's message arrived, Flaminius entered Gallic territory through the country of the Anares, and admitted the tribe into his friendship. Even after the letters arrived, driven by his fiery and ambitious nature, Flaminius refused to read the senate's directive until after he had joined battle with the Insubrians, whom he soundly defeated.

Polybius attributes Flaminius' victory not to the consul, but to his military tribunes, who from former battles had learnt the swords used by the Gauls after an initial onslaught became so bent they were unserviceable, unless the men had time to straighten them on the ground with their boots. Recognising this, the tribunes distributed spears among the front line with orders to allow the Gauls to slash at their spears, rendering their swords useless. The Romans then switched to swords, and slew the greater part of their enemies. Flaminius is judged by Polybius to have mismanaged the battle by deploying his force at the edge of the riverbank, not allowing for any tactical room to fall back upon, for if the troops were pushed back even by the slightest degree, they would have been forced into the river. Despite this apparent tactical oversight by Flaminius, the Romans were able to return to Rome with a large amount of booty and trophies due to their own skill and valour.

While Polybius details how Flaminius won an important victory for Rome, the majority of the sources focus upon the portent auspices which surrounded his consulship and his disobedience of the senate which led to both the abdication of his consulship and the attempted refusal of his triumph. While evidence steadfastly confirms Flaminius' triumph occurred, inconsistencies among sources point to some form of historical inaccuracy and fabrication. Plutarch details that upon Flaminius' return, the people would not go out to see him and due to his insolence and disobedience came close to denying him his triumph, compelled him to renounce his consulship, and made him a private citizen. While Livy labels his behaviour as insubordination towards both men and the gods, Silius Italicus describes Flaminius' actions as resulting in an easy triumph and crushing a fickle and guileless people. While the latter was most certainly true, Plutarch's version of events conflicts with Italicus'. Furthermore, Heinemann within his translation of Livy's History of Rome cites that Flaminius triumphed in the face of senatorial opposition by virtue of a decree of the people, which again further diverges with Plutarch's account where the people were the main barrier to the triumph. Other modern scholars such as Develin support Heinemann's view, which points towards an inaccuracy or fabrication on the part of Plutarch.

== Magister Equitum, 222 BC ==
Flaminius served as magister equitum in 222 BC, having been appointed to serve under the dictator Marcus Minucius Rufus. The magister equitum served as the deputy of a Roman dictator, being appointed by the dictator to assist him with his political and military functions. As such, the magister equitum's magistracy ended with the dictator's. While Plutarch and Valerius Maximus both recount how Flaminius' tenure as Master of the Horse ended as a result of poor omens—namely that a shrew-mouse was heard at an inopportune time—sources differ as to the course of events following said omens. While Plutarch claims "the people deposed these officials" (Flaminius and Mucinius), Valerius Maximums claims that the two abdicated their posts.

== Censorship and building program, 220 BC ==
Flaminius was elected as censor in 220, alongside his colleague Lucius Aemilius Papus. Livy provides an account of his achievements in this office. Flaminius registered and organised the freedmen of Rome into the four existing city tribes (Esquilina, Palatina, Subura and Collina). He also established the Roman colonies of Placentia and Cremona, situated at two points on opposite sides of the Padus. As censor, Flaminius also commissioned the construction of the Circus Flaminius and the Via Flaminia.

=== Circus Flaminius ===
The Circus Flaminius was located at the southern end of the Campus Martius. Taylor writes that Flaminius was taking advantage of the existing association between the Prata Flaminia and the plebs, pointing out the advantage of having such an area outside the pomerium. It was circular in shape, with Varro suggesting that the shape was designed to accommodate the horse racing in the Taurian Games. It is likely that the Ludi Taurii were the only games that were held in the circus, with the majority of public spectacles held in the Circus Maximus. However, this didn't limit its usefulness as it was also used to host public assemblies. Over time, the area around the Circus Flaminius became extremely decadent, with Pompey, Caesar, and particularly Augustus building extravagant temples and public works there. Humphrey writes that "by the early third century AD, the open space had been reduced to a piazza in the front the great Augustan colonnades of Octavia and Philippus". By this date, Humphrey estimates that the piazza was less than 300 meters long.

=== Via Flaminia ===
The Via Flaminia was a road constructed by Flaminius during his censorship in 220 BC. The road travelled from the coast of Ariminum to Rome at the Porta del popolo via the Apennine Mountains. It was able to link the regions of Etruria, Latium and Marche (Ager Gallicus), thus facilitating greater connection and ease of communication between them and Rome. It also allowed for Rome to better mobilise their army to fight off invaders such as Hannibal in 219, and encouraged trade with the aforementioned regions as it allowed for quicker movement of goods like olives and wine. It also effected the political system in Rome positively as it became easier for citizens to travel to Rome in order to vote in elections.

== Support for the Lex Claudia, 218 BC ==
Flaminius was the only senator to support the tribune Quintus Claudius in passing his Lex Claudia, a law preventing the ownership of ships with a capacity of more than 300 amphorae by senators and their sons. The bill was passed despite strong opposition from the senate. Based on Livy's claim that 'all moneymaking was held unseemly in a senator', modern historians have argued that Flaminius was concerned that maritime trade and profits might jeopardise the values of the Roman elite. Following this argument, Nicolet interprets the law as a Roman attempt to follow an Aristotelian, moralistic tradition in preventing magistrates from engaging in financial affairs, the law acting as a formalisation of the traditional honour code already in operation among senators. D'Arms argues instead that only profits from the sea are disreputable as they were high risk and could swiftly ruin an entire family, which was problematic for the stability of the ruling class. Cassola points out that as senators could use clients or freedmen to run their business they could circumvent the law, arguing that the law instead intended to make the entry of new men (merchants and publicans) into the senate more difficult. Yavetz contends instead that Flaminius was supporting new plebeian senators and contractors who wanted to prevent senatorial competition in their ventures. Feig Vishnia argues that publicans with ships had the most to gain from the law as they were a growing political group and through the law were the only group capable of bidding for the contracts for the delivery of supplies to armies.

The date of the law coincides with the creation of the first two Roman provinces so it was possibly intended to prevent governors from exploiting their new positions for trading profits. There also may be a connection between the law and the growing threat from Hannibal as senators involved in maritime trade provoked a war with Demetrius of Pharus and the Istrians when another faction of senators would have preferred to intervene in Hannibalic Spain instead. Feig Vishnia argues that the law was a convenient political solution for Flaminius as he could see that senatorial competition for the state contracts previously monopolised by the publicans would lead to disgruntled publicans attempting to enter political offices to address their problem. The Claudian law prevented publicans from running for office at the same time as it prevented senators from participating in large-scale maritime trade.

== Second consulship and death, 217 BC ==
Hannibal baits Flaminius to Lake Trasimene 217 BCE

Flaminius entered his second term as consul in 217 amid inauspicious beginnings. Prompted by senatorial hostility, which was inflamed by his support of the Lex Claudia in 218, and the advancing Hannibalic army, Flaminius bypassed the traditional vows and rituals of consulship within Rome to take up office at Ariminum instead. Once there, Flaminius was assigned command of the four legions of Tiberius Sempronius, who had fought and lost against Hannibal at the Trebia the previous year. Despite remarks that he was acting against the will of the gods and the senate, Flaminius proceeded to ignore senatorial summons back to Rome and instead marched his troops to Etruria.

=== The Battle of Lake Trasimene ===
With spring approaching, Hannibal had set out from his winter quarters, and aimed to seize the town of Arretium. Upon hearing this news, Flaminius hastened his army to Arretium and beat Hannibal there whilst Servilius, his colleague, travelled with other forces to Ariminum. Hannibal then pitched his camp in the marshes around Arretium and set to plundering the rich countryside of central Etruria, to incite Flaminius to give battle before Servilius arrived with reinforcements. Witnessing this destruction, despite his war council advising patience, Flaminius summoned his troops.

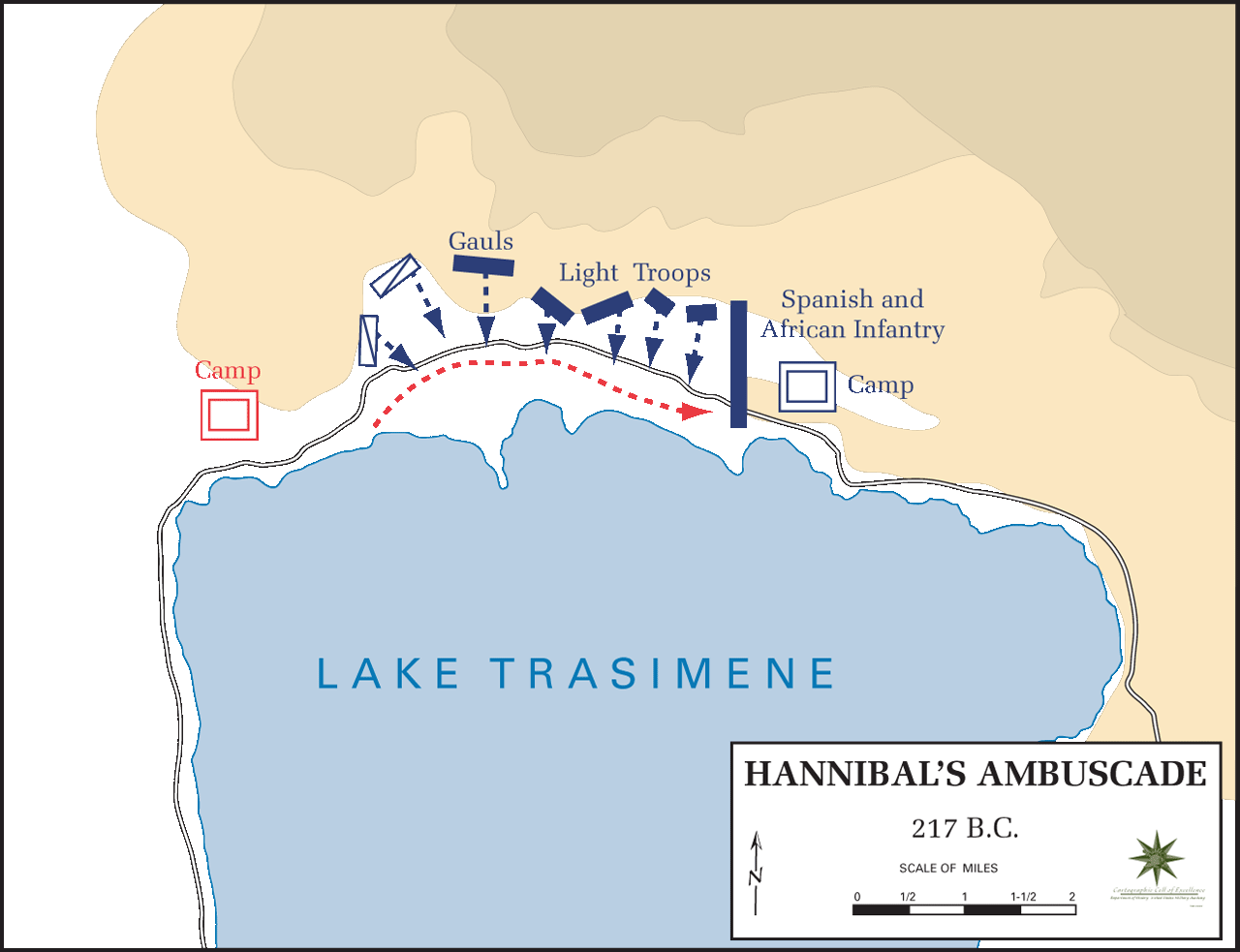
Hannibal's ambush at Lake Trasimene. From the Department of History, United States Military Academy.

This call to battle was, according to Livy's history and Cicero's later writings, followed by a double portent of Flaminius being thrown from his mount, and the legion's standard being unable to be moved. Despite the ill omens, Flaminius advanced with his men, straight into the ambush Hannibal had laid for the Roman troops on the plain between Lake Trasimene and the surrounding hills of Mt. Cortona. The Carthaginians were divided between the Spanish and African troops on the most visible hill, the light troops hidden in the mountains and the cavalry concealed near the narrow entrance to the plain. Once Flaminius' men entered the area they were ambushed, encircled and annihilated.

=== Death and legacy ===
Flaminius is criticised, most strongly by Polybius, for his rashness, lack of judgement, and lack of military expertise that led to this defeat. He is, however, praised by Livy for the strength and determination he displayed during the battle. The accounts of Flaminius' death vary amongst ancient sources; Polybius states he was killed by a group of Gauls, while Livy suggests it was a specific Insubrian horseman, Ducarius, who had recognised the Roman general. The overwhelming consensus, however, is that Flaminius was killed in the battle and his body never recovered, despite Hannibal searching for it in order to give his enemy a proper burial. 15,000 Roman soldiers were slain at Lake Trasimene, 6,000 were taken prisoner, and 10,000 were scattered across Etruria, eventually making their way back to Rome. Flaminius was survived by his son, Gaius Flaminius, notable for his consulship in 187 BC and wars fought against the Friniates and Apuani in Northern Italy.

== Debate over political alignment ==
Flaminius has been traditionally judged by ancient and modern historians as a popularis style leader in opposition to the conservative Fabius Maximus. Cassola challenges this, arguing for their political association by citing their mutual opposition to Roman expansion, support for Italian interests, disdain for religious convention and claims that the votes that gave Flaminius his second consulship appointed Fabius dictator after his death. He shows that there is little evidence in the ancient sources supporting enmity between the two, although Develin emphasises that Fabius clearly opposed Flaminius' agrarian law. Develin agrees with Cassola's case that Flaminius was Fabius' choice to serve as magister equitum under him as dictator. He argues that no consistent factional alignment or popular movement can be attributed to Flaminius, claiming his electoral and political success was primarily due to his obvious military and administrative talents. Develin believes that the only firm policies that can be linked to Flaminius are support for an Italian focus in Rome's affairs, which coincided with Fabius' interests, the support of aristocratic values and the dismissal of religious conventions for the sake of military expediency.

== Works cited ==
- Badian, E. "Gaius Flaminius". Encyclopædia Britannica. Retrieved 16 September 2017.
- Broughton, T.R.S. and American Council of Learned Societies (1984). The magistrates of the Roman Republic. Chico: Scholars Press.
- Coarelli, F. (2014). Rome and environs: an archaeological guide. Updated ed. Berkeley: University of California Press.
- Develin, R. (1979). "The Political Position Of C. Flaminius". Rheinisches Museum für Philologie, 122 (3/4), pp. 268–277.
- Feig Vishnia, R. (1996). State, society and popular leaders in mid-Republican Rome, 241–167 B.C. New York; London: Routledge.
- Feig Vishnia, R. (2012). "A Case of "Bad Press"? Gaius Flaminius in Ancient Historiography". Zeitschrift für Papyrologie und Epigraphik, 181, pp. 27–45
- Humphrey, J.H. (1986). Roman circuses: arenas for chariot racing. London: Batsford.
- Roselaar, S.T. (2010). Public land in the Roman Republic: A social and economic history of ager publicus in Italy, 396–89 BC. Oxford: Oxford University Press.
- Ross Taylor, L. (1966). Roman Voting Assemblies from the Hannibalic War to the Dictatorship of Caesar. Ann Arbor: University of Michigan Press.
- Sherwin-White, A. and Lintott, A. (2007). Magister Equitum. In: Oxford Dictionary of the Classical World. Oxford University Press.

Preceded by Titus Manlius Torquatus; Quintus Fulvius Flaccus	Roman consul 223 BC with Publius Furius Philus	Succeeded by Marcus Claudius Marcellus; Gnaeus Cornelius Scipio Calvus
Preceded by Publius Cornelius Scipio; Tiberius Sempronius Longus	Roman consul II; 217 BC with Gnaeus Servilius Geminus	Succeeded by Marcus Atilius Regulus as suffect
