= Battle of Lake Trasimene =

217 BC battle of the Second Punic War

- Part of the Second Punic War
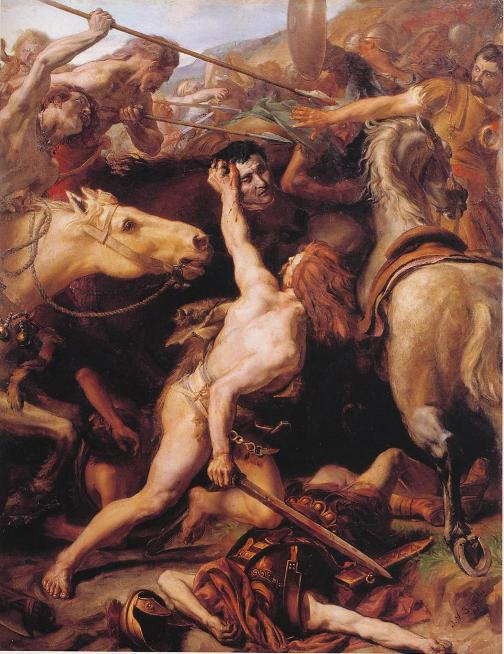
- Ducarius Beheads Flaminius at the Battle of Lake Trasimene (1882)
Date	21 June 217 BC
Location	The north shore of Lake Trasimene, Italy 43°11′51″N 12°05′06″E
Result	Carthaginian victory

Belligerents
Carthage	Rome

Commanders and leaders
Hannibal	Gaius Flaminius †

Strength
More than 50,000	25,000

Casualties and losses
1,500 or 2,500 killed; Many wounded	15,000 killed; 6,000–10,000 captured

Site of the battle within modern Italy

The Battle of Lake Trasimene was fought when a Carthaginian force under Hannibal ambushed a Roman army commanded by Gaius Flaminius on 21 June 217 BC, during the Second Punic War. The battle took place on the north shore of Lake Trasimene, to the south of Cortona, and resulted in a heavy defeat for the Romans.

War had broken out between Rome and Carthage early in 218 BC. Hannibal, ruler of the Carthaginian territories in south-east Iberia, marched an army through Gaul, crossed the Alps and arrived in Cisalpine Gaul (northern Italy) later that year. The Romans rushed reinforcements north from Sicily but were badly defeated at the Battle of the Trebia.

The following spring, the Romans positioned an army on each side of the Apennine Mountains, but were surprised when a Carthaginian army more than 50,000 strong crossed the range by a difficult but unguarded route. The Carthaginians moved south into Etruria, plundering, razing the villages and killing all men encountered. Flaminius, in charge of the nearest Roman army, set off in pursuit. Hannibal arranged an ambush on the north shore of Lake Trasimene and trapped the Romans. With the Carthaginians attacking unexpectedly from the flank and the rear, possibly in poor visibility, there was no chance for the Romans to form even a rudimentary fighting line and they were defeated after three hours of hard fighting with 15,000 being killed. The trap failed to enclose the 6,000 Romans at the front of the column, who escaped; later in the day they were surrounded by pursuing Carthaginians and surrendered. Thus nearly all 25,000 Romans in Flaminius's army were killed or captured. This destruction of an entire army as a result of an ambush by another army is widely considered a unique occurrence. Several days later the Carthaginians wiped out the entire cavalry force of the second Roman army, who were not yet aware of the earlier disaster.

The Carthaginians then marched towards southern Italy in the hope of winning over some of the ethnic Greek and Italic city-states there. News of the defeat caused a panic in Rome and led to the election of Quintus Fabius Maximus Verrucosus as dictator. Impatient with his Fabian strategy of avoiding major battles, the next year the Romans elected Lucius Paullus and Gaius Varro as consuls. These more aggressive commanders engaged Hannibal at the Battle of Cannae in 216 BC, resulting in a third and even worse disaster for Rome; it was followed by thirteen more years of war.

== Background ==
=== Pre-war ===
The approximate extent of territory controlled by Rome and Carthage immediately before the start of the Second Punic War

The First Punic War was fought from 264 to 241 BC between Carthage and Rome: these two main powers of the western Mediterranean in the 3rd century BC struggled for supremacy primarily on the Mediterranean island of Sicily and its surrounding waters and in North Africa. The war lasted for 23 years until the Carthaginians were defeated. Five years later an army commanded by the leading Carthaginian general Hamilcar Barca landed in Carthaginian Iberia (modern south-east Spain) which he greatly expanded and turned into a quasi-monarchical, autonomous territory ruled by the Barcids. This expansion gained Carthage silver mines, agricultural wealth, manpower, military facilities such as shipyards and territorial depth, which encouraged it to resist future Roman demands.

Hamilcar ruled as viceroy until his death in 228 BC. He was succeeded by his son-in-law, Hasdrubal, then his son Hannibal in 221 BC. In 226 BC the Ebro Treaty established the Ebro River as the northern boundary of the Carthaginian sphere of influence in Iberia. A little later Rome made a separate treaty of association with the independent city of Saguntum, well south of the Ebro. In 219 BC a Carthaginian army under Hannibal besieged, captured and sacked Saguntum, which led Rome to declare war on Carthage.

Meanwhile, the major Gallic tribes in Cisalpine Gaul (modern northern Italy), antagonised by the founding of several Roman settlements on traditionally Gallic territory, attacked the Romans, capturing several towns and repeatedly ambushing a Roman relief force. The Roman Senate reinforced its army in Cisalpine Gaul while also preparing armies to invade Carthaginian territories.

=== Carthage invades Italy ===
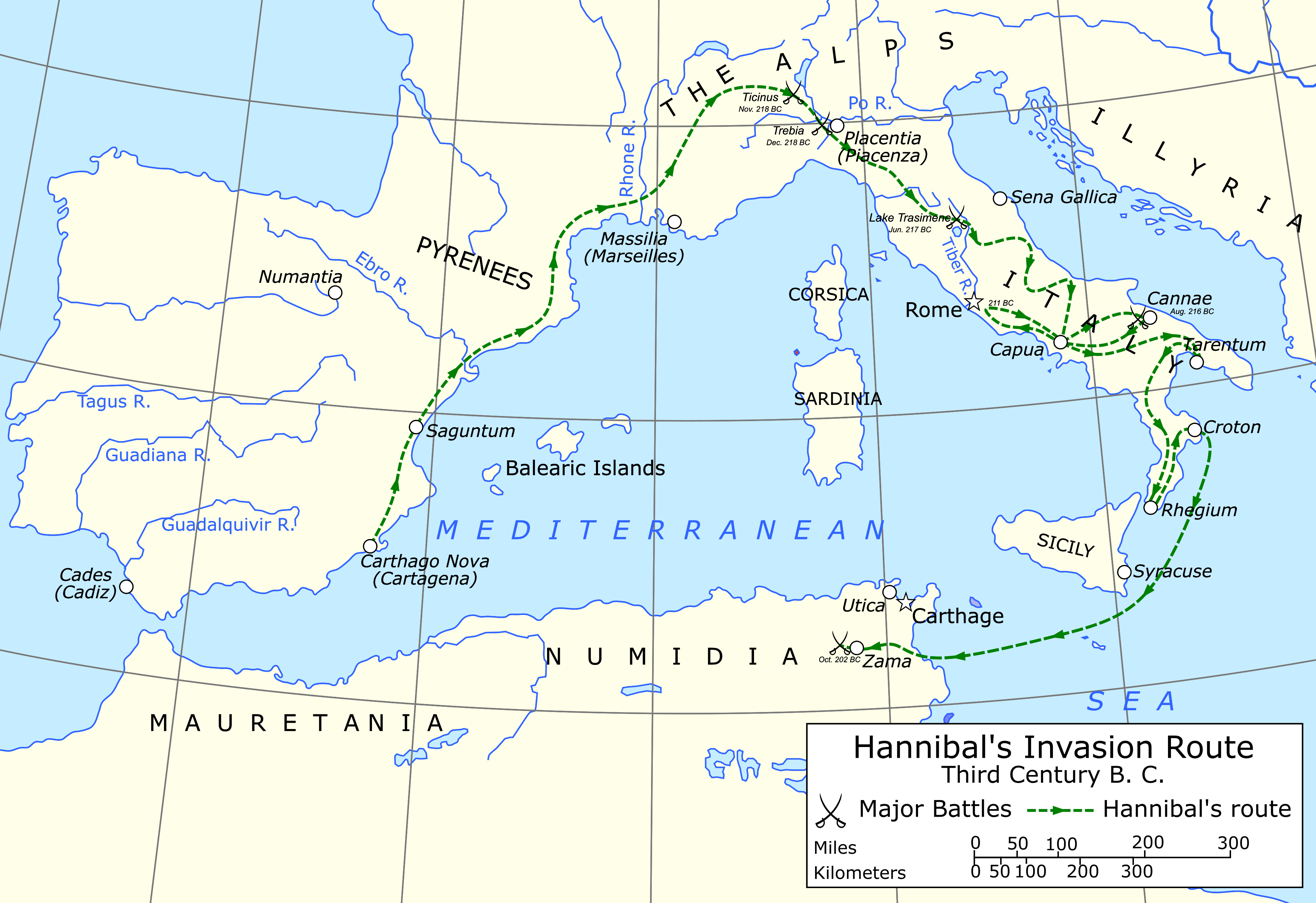
Hannibal's route from Iberia to Italy

Hannibal assembled a Carthaginian army in New Carthage (modern Cartagena) and marched north into Gaul in May 218 BC, leaving his brother, Hasdrubal Barca, in charge of Carthaginian interests in Iberia. The Carthaginian army crossed the Alps in October, surmounting the difficulties of climate, terrain and the guerrilla tactics of the native tribes. Hannibal arrived with 20,000 infantry, 6,000 cavalry and an unknown number of war elephants – the survivors of the 37 with which he had left Iberia – in Cisalpine Gaul. The Romans had already withdrawn to their winter quarters and were astonished by Hannibal's appearance.

The Romans went on the attack and the local Roman commander, the consul Publius Scipio, personally led a strong force of cavalry and light infantry against the Carthaginian cavalry at the Battle of Ticinus. He was soundly beaten and personally wounded. The Romans retreated to near Placentia, fortified their camp and awaited reinforcement. The Roman army in Sicily under Sempronius Longus was redeployed to the north and joined with Scipio's force. Numidian cavalry lured Sempronius and his army out of their camp and onto ground of Hannibal's choosing, where the Battle of the Trebia took place. Most of the Romans were killed or captured by the Carthaginians, but 10,000 under Sempronius fought their way to the safety of Placentia.

== Prelude ==
When news of the defeat at the Trebia reached Rome, it caused great alarm. This calmed once Sempronius arrived to preside over the consular elections in the usual manner. Gnaeus Geminus and Gaius Flaminius were selected and Sempronius then returned to Placentia to see out his term to 15 March. The consuls-elect recruited further legions, both from Rome and its Latin allies; reinforced Sardinia and Sicily against the possibility of Carthaginian raids or invasion; placed garrisons at Tarentum and other places for similar reasons; built a fleet of 60 quinqueremes; and, established supply depots at Ariminum and Arretium in Etruria in preparation for marching north later in the year. Two armies – of four legions each, two Roman and two allied, but with stronger than usual cavalry contingents – were formed. One was stationed at Arretium and one on the Adriatic coast; they would be able to block Hannibal's possible advance into central Italy and be well positioned to move north to operate in Cisalpine Gaul. In spite of their losses, the Romans fielded twenty-two legions in 217 BC, ten more than in 218 BC. The Gallic tribes in Cisalpine Gaul recognised the Carthaginians as the dominant force and sent plentiful supplies and many recruits to Hannibal's camp.

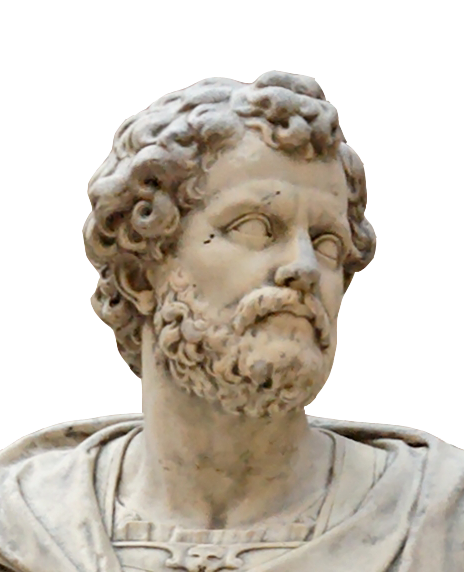
1704 French bust depicting Hannibal

In spring 217 BC, probably in early May, the Carthaginians crossed the Apennines unopposed, surprising the Romans by taking a difficult but unguarded route. The Carthaginians moved south into Etruria (modern Tuscany), plundering the countryside, looting the plentiful stocks of food, razing the villages and small towns, and killing out of hand all adult men encountered. Hannibal learned that one Roman army was at Arretium and was eager to bring it to battle, before it could be reinforced: Hannibal surmised the Romans would have another army on the east coast.

Once he learned that he had been bypassed, Flaminius, the commander of the Roman army at Arretium, set off in pursuit. The modern historian Adrian Goldsworthy points out that as they passed through territory devastated by the Carthaginians, there would have been a feeling of military failure and humiliation – the army existed to protect its homeland – and that the small farmers of the legions and their landowner officers would have taken this despoliation as an intense provocation. The Romans gained the impression, possibly fostered by Hannibal, that the Carthaginians were fleeing south before them; according to the ancient historian Polybius, they anticipated an easy victory. The Romans were pursuing so rapidly that they were unable to carry out proper reconnaissance, but they closed to less than a day's march behind their opponents. The Carthaginians bypassed the Roman-garrisoned city of Cortona and on 20 June marched along the north shore of Lake Trasimene. Hannibal decided this was a suitable spot to turn and fight.

== Opposing forces ==
=== Roman ===
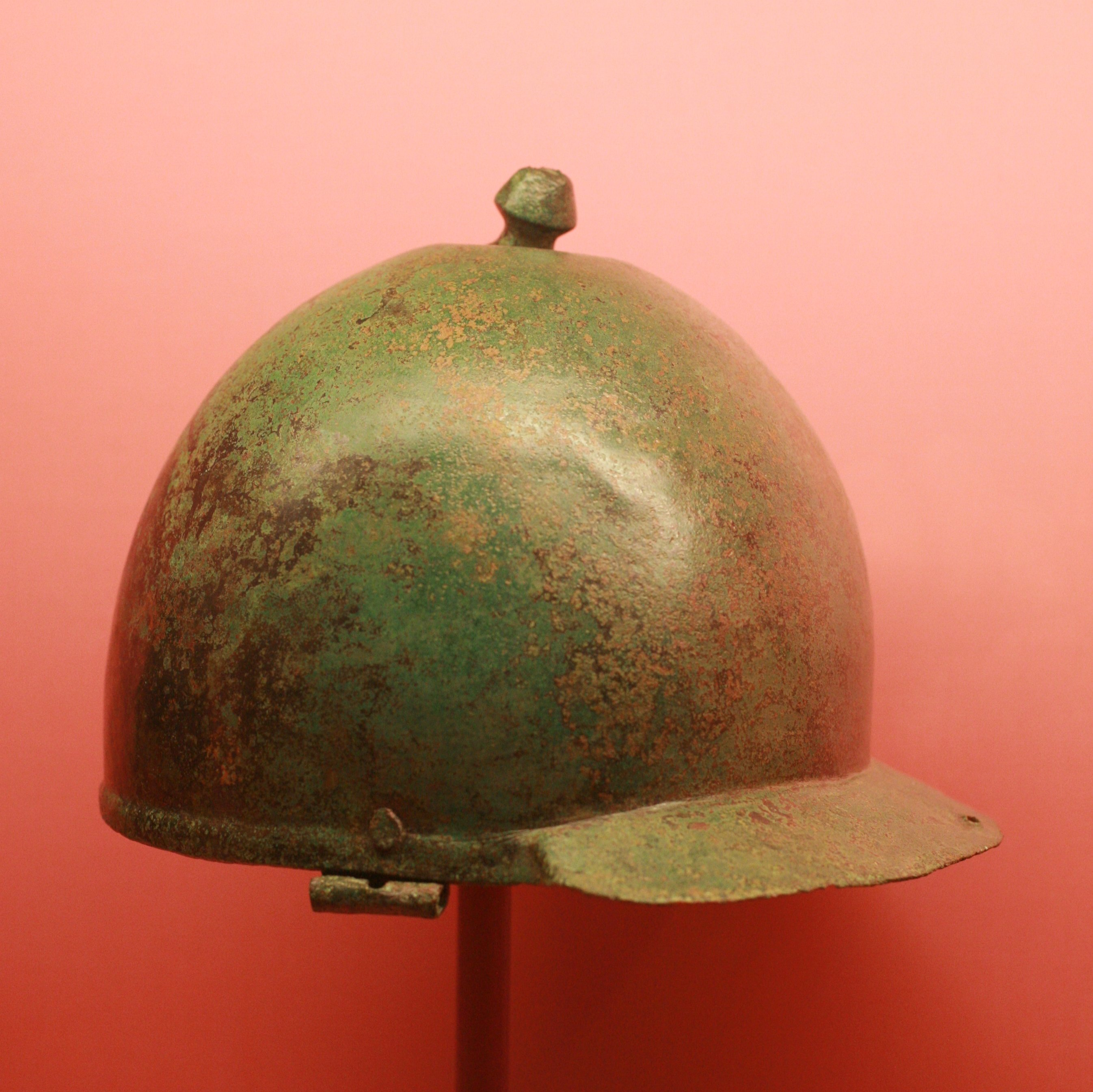
The bowl of a Montefortino-type helmet, which was used by Roman infantry between c. 300 BC and c. AD 100. The cheek guards are missing.

Most male Roman citizens were liable for military service and would serve as infantry, with a better-off minority providing a cavalry component. Traditionally, when at war the Romans would raise two legions, each of 4,200 infantry (Note: This could be increased to 5,000 in some circumstances, or, rarely, even more.) and 300 cavalry. Approximately 1,200 of the infantry, poorer or younger men unable to afford the armour and equipment of a standard legionary, served as javelin-armed skirmishers, known as velites; they carried several javelins, which would be thrown from a distance, a short sword and a 90-centimetre (3 ft) circular shield. The balance were equipped as heavy infantry, with body armour, a large shield and short thrusting swords. They were divided into three ranks, of which the front rank also carried two javelins, while the second and third ranks had a thrusting spear instead. Both legionary sub-units and individual legionaries fought in relatively open order. An army was usually formed by combining a Roman legion with a similarly sized and equipped legion provided by their Latin allies, but sometimes consisted of two Roman and two allied legions. Allied legions had a larger attached complement of cavalry than Roman ones. At Lake Trasimene, the Romans fielded four legions – two Roman and two made up of allies – for a total of approximately 25,000 men.

=== Carthaginian ===
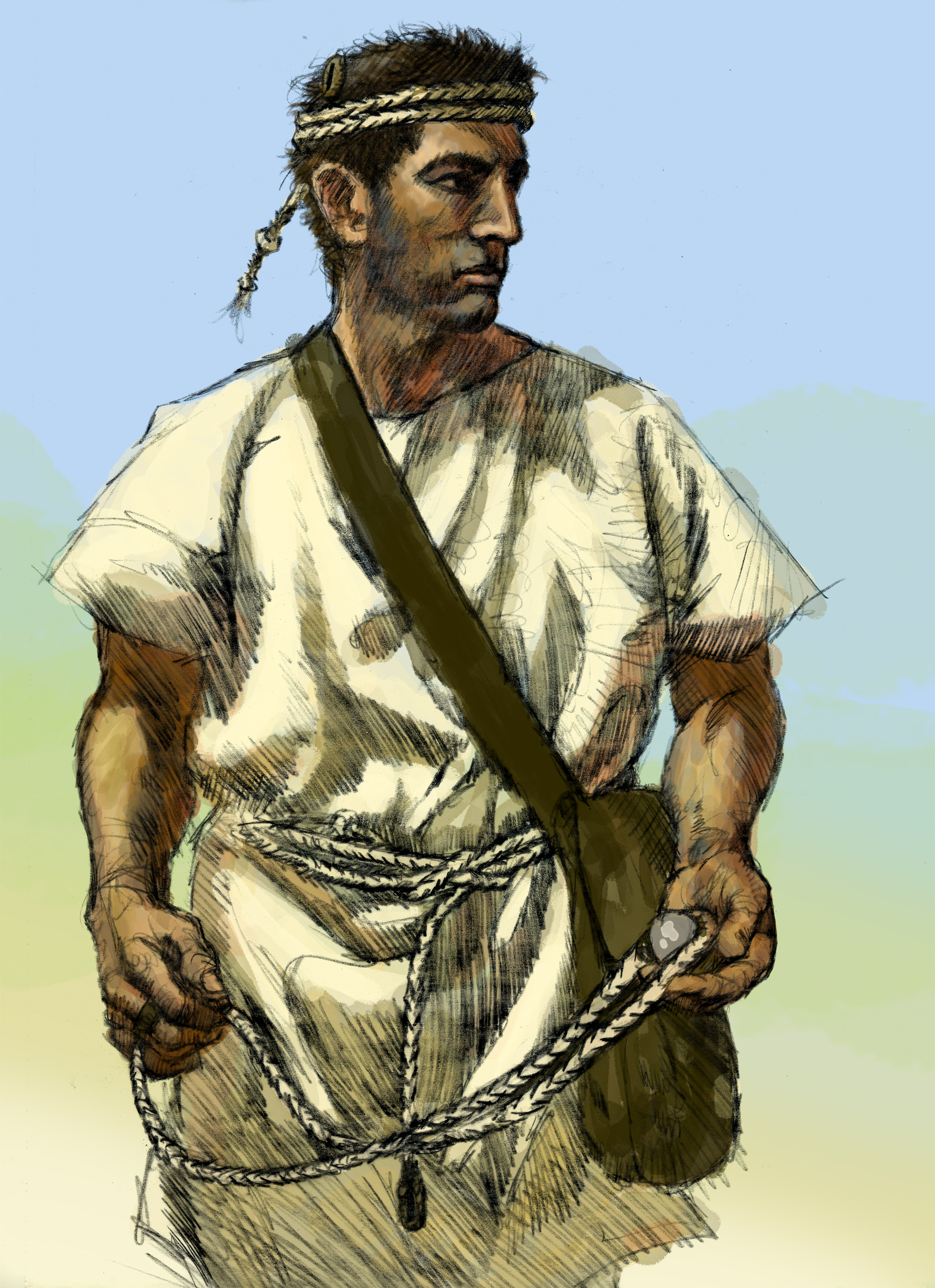
Modern interpretation of a slinger from the Balearic Islands (famous for the skill of their slingers)

Carthage usually recruited foreigners to make up its army. Many would be from North Africa – these were frequently referred to as Libyans – which provided several types of fighters, including: close-order infantry equipped with large shields, helmets, short swords and long thrusting spears; javelin-armed light infantry skirmishers; close-order shock cavalry (Note: "Shock" troops are those trained and used to close rapidly with an opponent, with the intention of breaking them before or immediately upon contact.) (also known as "heavy cavalry") carrying spears; and light cavalry skirmishers who threw javelins from a distance and avoided close combat. Both Iberia and Gaul provided experienced infantry: unarmoured troops who would charge ferociously, but had a reputation for breaking off if a combat was protracted. (Note: The Spanish used a heavy throwing spear that the Romans later adopted as the pilum.) Most of the African infantry would fight in a tightly packed formation known as a phalanx, usually forming two or three lines. Specialist slingers were recruited from the Balearic Islands.

The numbers fielded by the Carthaginians are not known, but an approximation can be made. Hannibal had arrived in Italy with 20,000 infantry and 6,000 cavalry, and had fought at the Trebia in December 218 BC with 31,000 and 11,000 respectively. In the wake of this victory, he was further heavily reinforced by local Gauls. In 216 BC, the Carthaginians, not having been reinforced since crossing the Apennines, had 40,000 infantry and 10,000 cavalry. It is usually assumed that more than 50,000 fought at Lake Trasimene. In any event, the Carthaginian army was considerably larger than the Roman.

== Battle ==
=== Setting the ambush ===
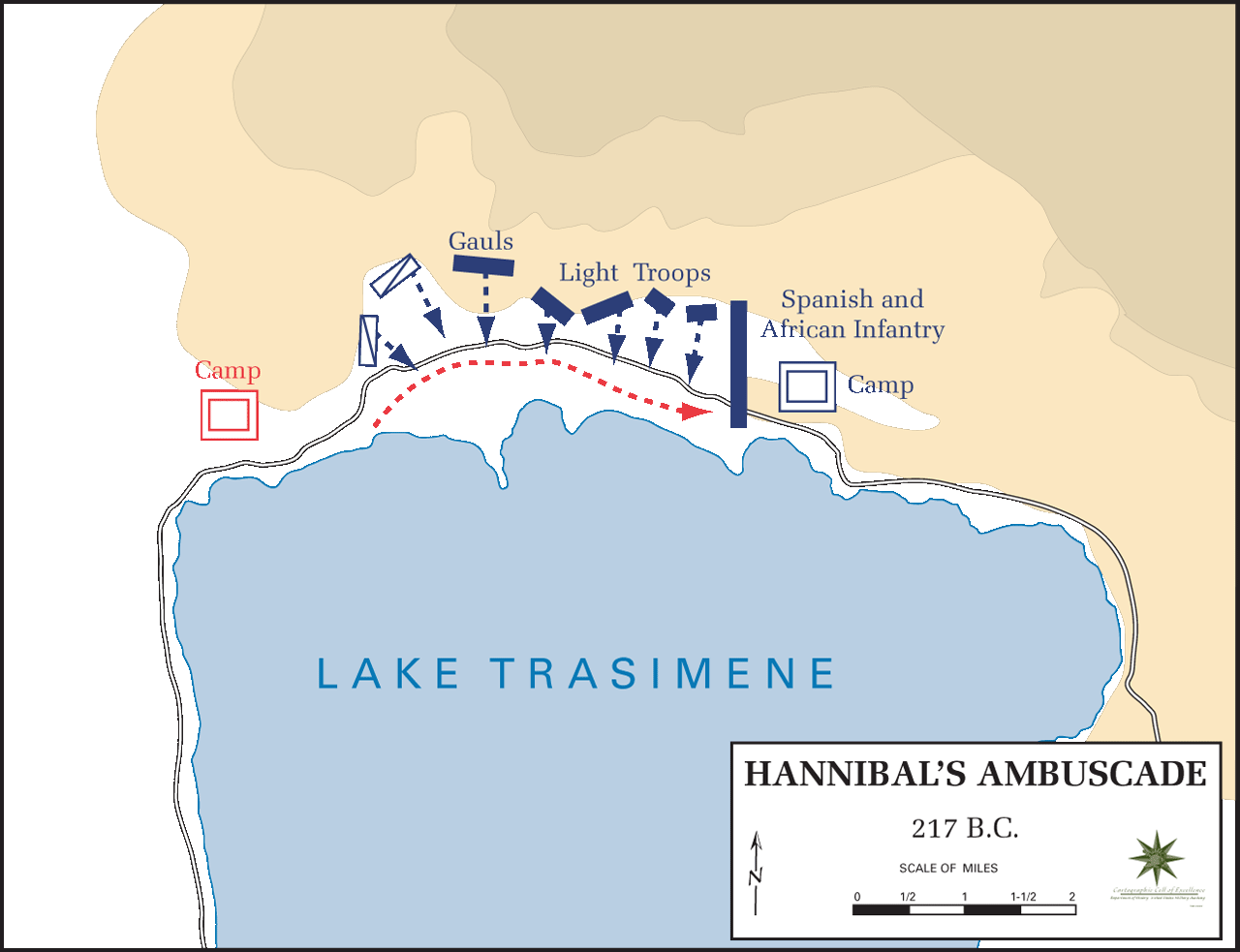
Hannibal's ambush at Lake Trasimene

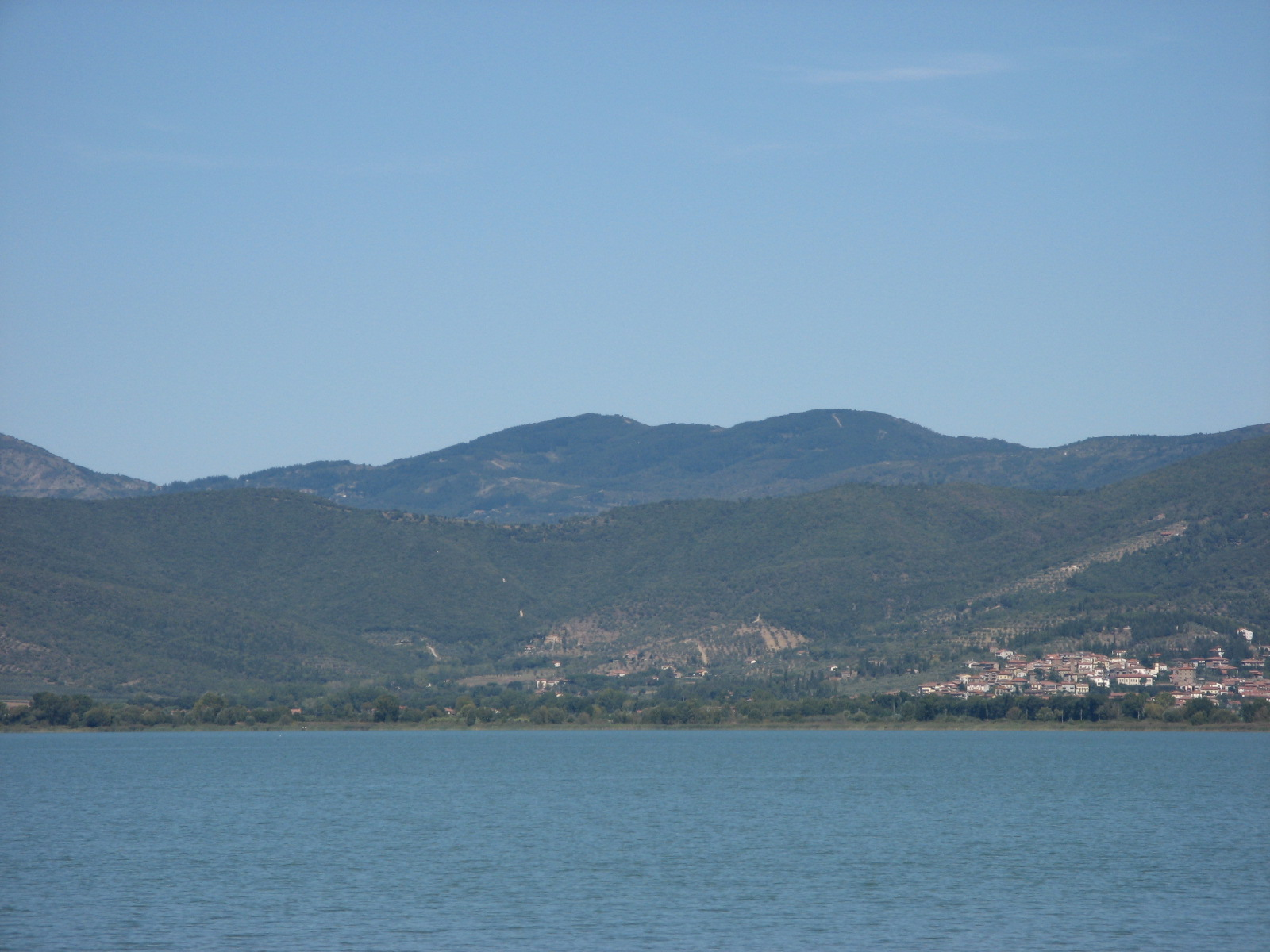
The north shore of Lake Trasimene, from the lake

The shoreline has changed since, but at the time of the battle, the road led along the north shore of the lake then turned south, still along the lakeshore, before climbing away from the lake through a defile. To the north of the road was a range of low hills that came closer to the lake towards the east, steadily reducing the open ground between them and the lake. The Carthaginians made camp where the hills were closest to the lake, near the defile. This was clearly visible to the Romans.

Once it was dark, Hannibal sent the components of his army on night marches behind the hills to the north of the lake to take up positions from which they could ambush the Roman army. Night marches are notoriously difficult and often result in units becoming lost in the dark or alerting their enemy. The Carthaginians avoided both of these and took up positions on the reverse slopes of the hills. The Carthaginian cavalry were positioned furthest to the west, the north-Italian Gallic infantry to their east and the experienced African and Iberian infantry furthest east, relatively close to their camp. Modern historians place the bulk of the many Carthaginian light infantry either around the defile and its mouth or as reinforcing the Gauls in the centre of the Carthaginian line.

On the morning of 21 June the Romans set off very early and marched eastward along the northern edge of the lake. Ancient accounts state that a thick morning mist near the lake limited visibility, but some modern historians have suggested this was either invented or exaggerated to excuse the Romans' subsequent unreadiness for battle. As Flaminius was expecting battle, the Romans probably marched in three parallel columns, which was their habit before a battle as this was relatively quicker to manoeuvre into a battle line compared with a single line of march. This swiftness was relative, as forming an army up in battle order was a complicated affair which would take several hours under any circumstances. (Note: If the Romans had been in a single column, it would have stretched for more than 8 kilometres (5 mi) along the lake shore, probably much more. This is not compatible with ancient accounts of the battle and it is difficult to see how the whole army could have been enveloped under these circumstances.) The Romans would have had a screen of light infantry out to their front and, to a lesser extent, their flank, as skirmishing was usual before a battle with the armies' respective light troops shielding their close-order colleagues while they formed up. Flaminius did not send out cavalry scouts to make a more distant reconnaissance; Roman armies of the time rarely did so.

The Battle of Lake Trasimene 217 BCE

=== Springing the trap ===
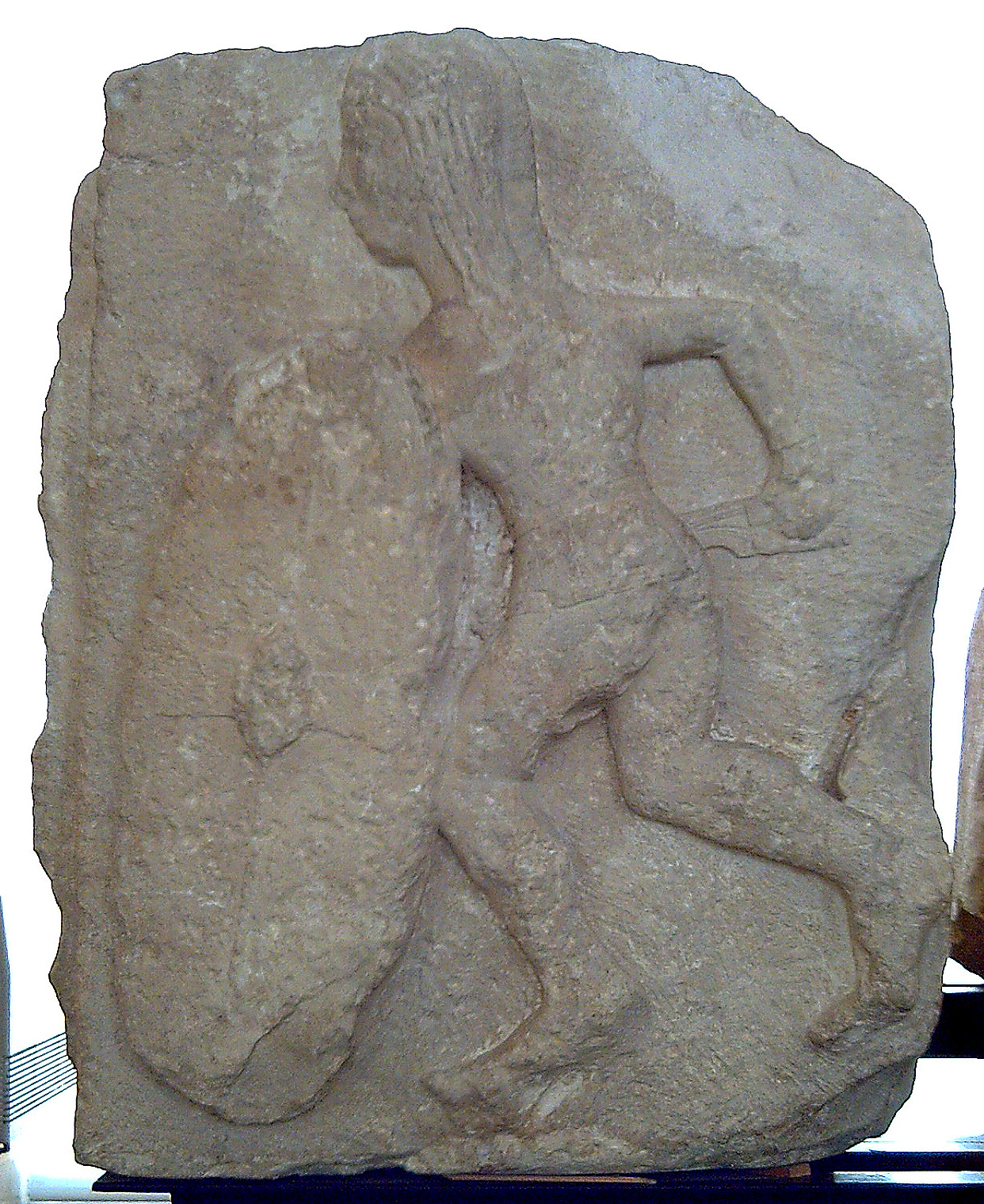
An Iberian warrior from a bas-relief made c. 200 BC

The leading Romans made contact with the most easterly of the Carthaginians, probably some of the African or Iberian close-order infantry and the signal was given for all of the Carthaginians to advance, possibly by the sounding of trumpets. According to some ancient accounts, the Romans could hear these signals on their flank and to their rear, but could not see their enemy, which caused confusion. It would have taken several hours for the Romans to convert their formation into a battle array, even if they had known which direction to face. As it was, with the Carthaginians attacking unexpectedly from the flank and the rear, possibly with poor visibility, there was no chance to form even a rudimentary fighting line. Some Romans fled while others clustered into groups of various sizes, ready to engage the enemy on all sides. The fugitives and many of the impromptu Roman groups were rapidly cut down or captured. Other groups of Romans put up a stiff fight, especially in the centre, where the attacking Gauls suffered heavy casualties before beating down the trapped Romans after three hours of heavy combat.

According to Polybius, Flaminius was completely surprised and provided no effective leadership. The openly pro-Roman ancient historian Livy, who otherwise paints a poor picture of Flaminius, recorded two centuries later that he was active and valiant in attempting to rally his army and organise a defence before being cut down by a Gaul, Ducarius. The trapped portion of the Roman army collapsed. Men attempted to swim across the lake and drowned; others waded out until the water was up to their necks and the Carthaginian cavalrymen swam their horses out to chop at their exposed heads.

The trap failed to close on the 6,000 Romans at the front of the column, who were possibly also those most prepared for battle, and they pushed their way out of the defile against little opposition. Realising that they could not affect the battle behind them, they marched on. Later in the day they were surrounded by pursuing Carthaginians and surrendered to a force under Maharbal on the promise of being disarmed and freed; "with a garment apiece" according to Livy. Hannibal disapproved and only applied this to the allied captives, while selling the Romans into slavery. Many of the Carthaginian infantry, especially the Libyans, equipped themselves with captured Roman armour.

=== Casualties and follow up ===
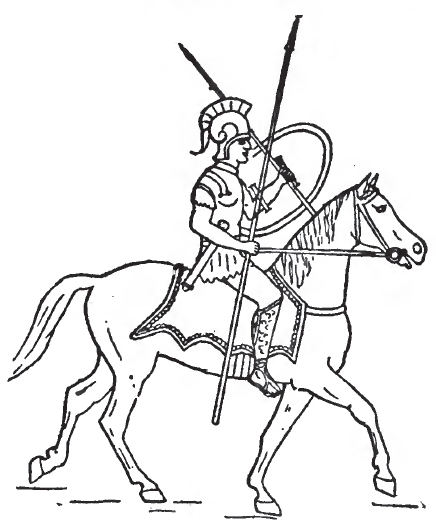
A Carthaginian cavalryman, as depicted in 1891

The ancient sources are unclear as to the fate of the approximately 25,000 Romans known to have been engaged. According to the contemporary annalist and senator Fabius Pictor, 15,000 were killed and 10,000 scattered. The usually reliable Polybius has 15,000 killed and most of the rest captured. Polybius reports losses of 1,500 killed for the Carthaginians, most of them Gauls; Livy gives 2,500 killed on the day and "many" who subsequently died of their wounds.

The second Roman army, originally positioned on the Adriatic coast and commanded by Gnaeus Geminus, had been marching west, intending to join up with Flaminius. Unaware that the destruction of Flaminius's army had left the Carthaginians able to manoeuvre freely, Geminus's entire cavalry force of 4,000 was scouting ahead when it was surprised by the Carthaginians a few days after Trasimene. Nearly 2,000 were killed in the first clash; the balance were surrounded and captured the next day. Geminus withdrew his infantry back to Ariminum (modern Rimini) on the Adriatic.

== Aftermath ==
The Roman prisoners were badly treated by the Carthaginians, but the captured Latin allies were treated well and many were freed and sent back to their cities in the hope that they would speak highly of Carthaginian martial prowess and of their own treatment. Hannibal hoped some of these allies could be persuaded to defect. The Carthaginians continued their march through Etruria, then Umbria, to the Adriatic coast, continuing their devastation and plundering of the territory they crossed and the killing of any adult men captured; the Gauls were especially brutal in this respect. Contemporary reports claim that the Carthaginian soldiers accumulated so much booty that they had to cease looting because they could not carry any more. The army then marched south into Apulia, in the hope of winning over some of the ethnic Greek and Italic city states of southern Italy.

Fabius reorganizes the war effort, 217 BC

The populace of Rome fell into a panic when word of the defeat was received. Quintus Fabius Maximus Verrucosus was elected dictator by the Roman Assembly and adopted the "Fabian strategy" of avoiding pitched conflict, relying instead on low-level harassment to wear the invader down while Rome rebuilt its military strength. Hannibal was left largely free to ravage Apulia for the next year, until the Romans ended the dictatorship and elected Paullus and Varro as consuls in 216 BC. These more aggressive commanders offered battle to Hannibal, who accepted and won a victory at Cannae, where some 70,000 Romans were killed or captured; the modern historian Richard Miles describes this as "Rome's greatest military disaster". Subsequently, the Carthaginians campaigned in southern Italy for a further 13 years.

In 204 BC Publius Cornelius Scipio, the son of the Scipio who had been wounded at Ticinus, invaded the Carthaginian homeland, defeated the Carthaginians in two major battles and won the allegiance of the Numidian kingdoms of North Africa. Hannibal and the remnants of his army were recalled from Italy to confront him. They met at the Battle of Zama in October 202 BC and Hannibal was decisively defeated. As a consequence, Carthage agreed to a peace treaty which stripped it of most of its territory and power.

=== Evaluation ===
According to the modern military historian Basil Liddell Hart, Hannibal planned and executed "the greatest ambush in history". The ambush and destruction of one army by another is widely considered a unique occurrence. Military historian Theodore Dodge notes that "It is the only instance in history of lying in ambush with the whole of a large army". Historian Robert O'Connell writes that it was "the only time an entire large army was effectively swallowed and destroyed by such a maneuver." The historian Toni Ñaco del Hoyo describes the Battle of Lake Trasimene as one of the three "great military calamities" suffered by the Romans in the first three years of the war, the others being the Trebia and Cannae.

== Notes, citations and sources ==
=== Sources ===
- Bagnall, Nigel (1999). The Punic Wars: Rome, Carthage and the Struggle for the Mediterranean. London: Pimlico. ISBN 978-0-7126-6608-4.
- Briscoe, John (2006). "The Second Punic War". In Astin, A. E.; Walbank, F. W.; Frederiksen, M. W.; Ogilvie, R. M. (eds.). The Cambridge Ancient History: Rome and the Mediterranean to 133 B.C. Vol. VIII. Cambridge: Cambridge University Press. pp. 44–80. ISBN 978-0-521-23448-1 – via the Internet Archive.
- Carey, Brian Todd (2007). Hannibal's Last Battle: Zama & the Fall of Carthage. Barnsley, South Yorkshire: Pen & Sword. ISBN 978-1-84415-635-1.
- Collins, Roger (1998). Spain: An Oxford Archaeological Guide. Oxford University Press. ISBN 978-0-19-285300-4 – via the Internet Archive.
- Dodge, Theodore A. (2004) [1891]. Hannibal. Cambridge, Mass.: Da Capo Press. ISBN 978-0-306-81362-7.
- Erdkamp, Paul (2015) [2011]. "Manpower and Food Supply in the First and Second Punic Wars". In Hoyos, Dexter (ed.). A Companion to the Punic Wars. Chichester, West Sussex: John Wiley. pp. 58–76. ISBN 978-1-1190-2550-4.
- Fronda, Michael P. (2015) [2011]. "Hannibal: Tactics, Strategy, and Geostrategy". In Hoyos, Dexter (ed.). A Companion to the Punic Wars. Oxford: Wiley-Blackwell. pp. 242–259. ISBN 978-1-405-17600-2.
- Goldsworthy, Adrian (2006). The Fall of Carthage: The Punic Wars 265–14 BC. London: Phoenix. ISBN 978-0-304-36642-2.
- Hoyos, Dexter (2015). Mastering the West: Rome and Carthage at War. Oxford: Oxford University Press. ISBN 978-0-19-986010-4 – via the Internet Archive.
- Koon, Sam (2015) [2011]. "Phalanx and Legion: the "Face" of Punic War Battle". In Hoyos, Dexter (ed.). A Companion to the Punic Wars. Chichester, West Sussex: John Wiley. pp. 77–94. ISBN 978-1-1190-2550-4.
- Jones, Archer (1987). The Art of War in the Western World. Urbana: University of Illinois Press. ISBN 978-0-252-01380-5 – via the Internet Archive.
- Lazenby, John (1996). The First Punic War: A Military History. Stanford, California: Stanford University Press. ISBN 978-0-8047-2673-3.
- Lazenby, John F. (1998). Hannibal's War: A Military History of the Second Punic War. Warminster: Aris & Phillips. ISBN 978-0-85668-080-9 – via the Internet Archive.
- Liddell Hart, Basil (1967). Strategy: The Indirect Approach. London: Penguin. OCLC 470715409 – via the Internet Archive.
- Lomas, Kathryn (2015) [2011]. "Rome, Latins, and Italians in the Second Punic War". In Hoyos, Dexter (ed.). A Companion to the Punic Wars. Chichester, West Sussex: John Wiley. pp. 339–356. ISBN 978-1-1190-2550-4.
- Mahaney, W.C. (2008). Hannibal's Odyssey: Environmental Background to the Alpine Invasion of Italia. Piscataway, New Jersey: Gorgias Press. ISBN 978-1-59333-951-7.
- Miles, Richard (2011). Carthage Must be Destroyed. London: Penguin. ISBN 978-0-14-101809-6.
- Ñaco del Hoyo, Toni (2015) [2011]. "Roman Economy, Finance, and Politics in the Second Punic War". In Hoyos, Dexter (ed.). A Companion to the Punic Wars. Chichester, West Sussex: John Wiley. pp. 376–392. ISBN 978-1-1190-2550-4.
- O'Connell, Robert L. (2010). The Ghosts of Cannae: Hannibal and the Darkest Hour of the Roman Republic. New York: Random House. ISBN 978-1-4000-6702-2.
- Rawlings, Louis (2015) [2011]. "The War in Italy, 218–203". In Hoyos, Dexter (ed.). A Companion to the Punic Wars. Chichester, West Sussex: John Wiley. pp. 299–319. ISBN 978-1-1190-2550-4.
- Zimmermann, Klaus (2015) [2011]. "Roman Strategy and Aims in the Second Punic War". In Hoyos, Dexter (ed.). A Companion to the Punic Wars. Oxford: Wiley-Blackwell. pp. 280–298. ISBN 978-1-405-17600-2.

== External resources ==
- Polybius' and Livy's accounts side by side in English.
