= Heia gens =

Ancient Roman family

The gens Heia was a minor plebeian family of ancient Rome. They are little mentioned by Roman writers, except for a prominent family of Messana in Sicily, during the final century of the Roman Republic. They were part of the ancient nobility of the city, and at some time became hereditary clientes of the Claudian gens. Other Heii are known from inscriptions.

== Origin ==
The nomen Heius belongs to a large class of gentilicia formed using the suffix -eius, which was common in names of Oscan origin. A great number of the Heii known from epigraphy came from towns in southern Italy.

== Praenomina ==
The chief praenomina of the Heii were Gaius and Marcus, but members of this gens used a wide variety of common names, including Gnaeus, Lucius, Numerius, Publius, and Titus, with individual instances of Quintus and Tiberius.

== Members ==
This list includes abbreviated praenomina. For an explanation of this practice, see filiation.

- Gaius Heius T. f. Libo, one of the magistrates at a sanctuary on Delos in Achaia in the late second century BC. He seems to be the same person who, as a wealthy resident of Messana in Sicily, possessed four magnificent statues, including a Cupid by Praxiteles, which was lent to Gaius Claudius Pulcher during the latter's aedileship in 99 BC. Years later, they and a set of rich tapestries belonging to Heius were among the works of art plundered by Verres during his praetorship. In 70 BC, Heius led a delegation of witnesses from Messana to testify at the trial of Verres.
- Gnaeus Heius, one of the judges of the Judicium Albianum, the court that tried Oppianicus in 74 BC.
- Heius, a youth of Lilybaeum, was a ward of Gaius Claudius Marcellus, governor of Sicily in 79 BC. Verres used his position to despoil Heius of his money and works of art, including a set of drinking vessels adorned with symbols of Lilybaeum. He is sometimes confused with Gaius Heius of Messana, from whom Verres stole a number of statues, mentioned by Cicero in the same oration.
- Heia, the daughter of Papus, named in a sepulchral inscription from Pompeii in Campania, dating from the middle portion of the first century BC.
- Lucius Heius L. l. Caerea Marulus, a freedman buried at Rome, in a tomb dating from the latter half of the first century BC, built by the freedwoman Colia Galla, perhaps his wife.
- Publius Heius Nicia, named along with Numerius Calinius Canopus, in an inscription from Cumae in Campania, dating from the latter half of the first century BC.
- Heia Ampliata, a young woman buried at Rome, aged seventeen, along with Heia Stemma, in a tomb dating from the late first century BC, or the early first century AD.
- Heia Stemma, a girl buried at Rome, aged thirteen, along with Heia Ampliata, in a tomb dating from the late first century BC, or the early first century AD.
- Gaius Heius Aristo(?), one of the duumvirs at ancient Corinth in Achaia during the Augustan era.
- Marcus Heius M. l. Damophilus, a freedman buried together with his wife in an Augustan-era tomb at Bononia in Cisalpine Gaul.
- Marcus Heius C. f., buried along with Heia Polla, probably his daughter, at Nola in Campania, in a tomb dating from the late first century BC, or the early first century AD.
- Heia M. f. Polla, buried along with Marcus Heius, probably her father, in a tomb at Nola, dating from the late first century BC, or the early first century AD.
- Gaius Heius C. l. Epagathus, a freedman named along with the freedwomen Heia Tertia and Heia Salvia, and the freedman Marcus Heius Simo, in an inscription from Cumae, dating between the late first century BC and the first half of the first century AD.
- Heia C. l. Salvia, a freedwoman named along with the freedwoman Heia Tertia, and the freedmen Gaius Heius Epagathus and Marcus Heius Simo, in an inscription from Cumae, dating between the late first century BC and the first half of the first century AD.
- Marcus Heius C. C. M. l. Simo, a freedman named along with the freedwomen Heia Tertia and Heia Salvia, and the freedman Gaius Heius Epagathus, in an inscription from Cumae, dating between the late first century BC and the first half of the first century AD.
- Heia C. l. Tertia, a freedwoman named along with the freedwoman Heia Salvia, and the freedmen Gaius Heius Epagathus and Marcus Heius Simo, in an inscription from Cumae], dating between the late first century BC and the first half of the first century AD.
- Numerius Heius N. f. Vensanus, named in a sepulchral inscription from Abellinum in Campania, dating between the late first century BC and the first half of the first century AD.
- Titus Heius Speratus, one of a number of persons named in a sepulchral inscription from Aquileia in Venetia and Histria, dating from the first half of the first century.
- Marcus Heius Dionysius, the tutor, or guardian, of the freedwoman Umbreia Utilis, who bult a tomb at Puteoli in Campania, dating from the early or middle first century, for herself, Dionysius, and at least two other persons, Gaius Marc[...] Rutilio and Callisto.
- Heia M. f. Rufula, one of two women of this name serving as priestesses of Ceres at Pompeii; one was the daughter of Marcus, and the other the daughter of Lucius.
- Heia L. f. Rufula, one of two women of this name serving as priestesses of Ceres at Pompeii; one was the daughter of Lucius, and the other the daughter of Marcus.
- Tiberius Heius Ti. f. Rufus, one of the municipal duumvirs at Saepinum in Samnium, where he was buried in a first-century tomb.
- Heia Tyrannis, named on a first-century cinerarium from Rome.
- Marcus Heius, governor of Roman Egypt between AD 42 and 45.
- Heia Melpomene, a priestess of the Roman imperial cult at Halaesa in Sicily, named in an inscription dating between the latter half of the first century, and the early part of the second.
- Marcus (H)eius? Antigonus, dedicated a tomb at Rome, dating between the latter half of the first century and the first half of the second, for his wife, Claudia Saturnina.
- Gaius Heius C. l. Primus Cato, Flamen Augustalis at Olisipo in Lusitania in AD 57, during the reign of Nero, provided the orchestra for the theatre of that city. He was later buried at Olisipo, in a tomb dedicated by his freedmen and their children.
- Gaius Heius C. l. Nothus, the freedman of Gaius Heius Primus Cato, flamen of the Imperial cult at Olisipo, married his conliberta, Heia Elpis, and was the father of Heia Notha Secunda, Gaius Heius Primus Cato, Heia Chelido, and Titus Heius Glaphyrus Nothianus. Together they dedicated a tomb for the flamen Gaius Heius Primus Cato.
- Heia C. l. Elpis, the freedwoman of Gaius Heius Primus Cato, flamen of the Imperial cult at Olisipo, married her conlibertus Gaius Heius Nothus, and was the mother of Heia Notha Secunda, Gaius Heius Primus Cato, Heia Chelido, and Titus Heius Glaphyrus Nothianus.
- Heia C. f. Notha Secunda, daughter of the freedman Gaius Heius Nothus and Heia Elpis, and sister of Gaius Heius Primus Cato, Heia Chelido, and Titus Heius Glaphyrus Nothianus.
- Gaius Heius C. f. Primus Cato, son of the freedman Gaius Heius Nothus and Heia Elpis, and brother of Heia Notha Secunda, Heia Chelido, and Titus Heius Glaphyrus Nothianus.
- Heia C. f. Chelido, daughter of the freedman Gaius Heius Nothus and Heia Elpis, and sister of Heia Notha Secunda, Gaius Heius Primus Cato, and Titus Heius Glaphyrus Nothianus.
- Titus Heius C. f. Glaphyrus Nothianus, son of the freedman Gaius Heius Nothus and Heia Elpis, and brother of Heia Notha Secunda, Gaius Heius Primus Cato, and Heia Chelido.
- Gaius Heius C. f. Mansuetus, a native of Arcobriga in Lusitania, a legionary, perhaps in the Legio I Adiutrix, had served for at least ten years, and was buried at Mogontiacum in Germania Superior, in a tomb dating between AD 80 and 85.
- Publius Heius Rufus Ta[...], a soldier serving in the century of Comicus in the third cohort of the Praetorian Guard at Rome in the first quarter of the third century.

=== Undated Heii ===
- Heius, named in a fragmentary inscription from Rome, also mentioning one or more members of the Julia gens.
- Marcus(?) Heius, named in a sepulchral inscription from Rome.
- Numerius Heius N. f., one of the seviri Augustales, buried at Fanum Fortunae in Umbria, in a tomb built by his wife, Paquia.
- Quintus Heius Q. f., buried at Venusia in Samnium.
- Lucius Heius L. f. Calaesio, had been aedile and duumvir, buried at the site of modern Cornedo Vicentino, formerly part of Venetia and Histria, along with his wife, Gellia Secunda.
- Lucius Heius Labeo, together with Gaius Cornelius Carito, municipal duumvirs at Murcia in Hispania Citerior.
- Gaius Heius Pamphilus, one of the duumvirs at Corinth, responsible for exhibiting the Isthmian Games.
- Gaius Heius Phoebus, a retiarius, a gladiator armed with a net, named in an inscription from Nemausus in Gallia Narbonensis, dedicated by his wife, Mnemenonia.
- Heia Rusca, buried at Augustonemetum in Gallia Aquitania.
- Gnaeus Heius Cn. l. Seleucus, a freedman buried at Rome, in a tomb built by his conliberta, Heia Sotera.
- Heia Cn. l. Sotera, dedicated a tomb at Rome for her conlibertus, Gnaeus Heius Seleucus.

== See also ==
- List of Roman gentes

== Bibliography ==
- Marcus Tullius Cicero, In Verrem, Pro Cluentio.
- Bollettino di Studi Latini (Bulletin of Latin Studies).
- Bullettino della Commissione Archeologica Comunale in Roma (Bulletin of the Municipal Archaeological Commission of Rome, abbreviated BCAR), (1872–present).
- René Cagnat et alii, L'Année épigraphique (The Year in Epigraphy, abbreviated AE), Presses Universitaires de France (1888–present).
- La Carte Archéologique de la Gaule (Archaeological Map of Gaul, abbreviated CAG), Académie des Inscriptions et Belles-Lettres (1931–present).
- George Davis Chase, "The Origin of Roman Praenomina", in Harvard Studies in Classical Philology, vol. VIII, pp. 103–184 (1897).
- Cuma: Indagini archeologiche e nuove scoperte (Cumae: Archaeological Investigations and New Discoveries), Carlo Gasparri and Giovanna Greco Pozzuoli, eds., Naus, Pozzuoli (2009).
- Dictionary of Greek and Roman Biography and Mythology, William Smith, ed., Little, Brown and Company, Boston (1849).
- Manfred Clauss, Anne Kolb, & Wolfgang A. Slaby, Epigraphik Datenbank Clauss/Slaby (abbreviated EDCS).
- Ferdinando Colonna, Scoperte di antichità in Napoli dal 1876 a tutto il 1897 (Discoveries of Antiquities in Naples from 1876 to the end of 1897), Giannini & Sons, Naples (1898).
- Gian Luca Gregori, La collezione epigrafica dell'antiquarium comunale del Celio (The Epigraphic Collection of the Ancient Community of the Caelian Hill), Quasar, Rome (2001).
- John Harvey Kent, Corinth: The Inscriptions, 1926–1950, American School of Classical Studies at Athens, Princeton (1966).
- Theodor Mommsen et alii, Corpus Inscriptionum Latinarum (The Body of Latin Inscriptions, abbreviated CIL), Berlin-Brandenburgische Akademie der Wissenschaften (1853–present).
- Notizie degli Scavi di Antichità (News of Excavations from Antiquity, abbreviated NSA), Accademia dei Lincei (1876–present).
- Jonathan R. W. Prag, Gabriella Tigano, Alesa Archonidea: Il lapidarium (The Lapidarium of Ancient Halaesa), Alesa (2017).
- Nicholas K. Rauh, The Sacred Bonds of Commerce: Religion, Economy, and Trade Society at Hellenistic Roman Delos, 166–87 B.C., J.C. Gieben, Amsterdam (1993).
- Frank Sear, Roman Theatres: an Architectural Study, Oxford University Press (2006).
- Luigi Tonini, Rimini avanti il principio dell'era volgare (Rimini Before the Beginning of the Common Era), Orfanelli, Rimini (1848).
