= Claudia gens =

Ancient Roman family

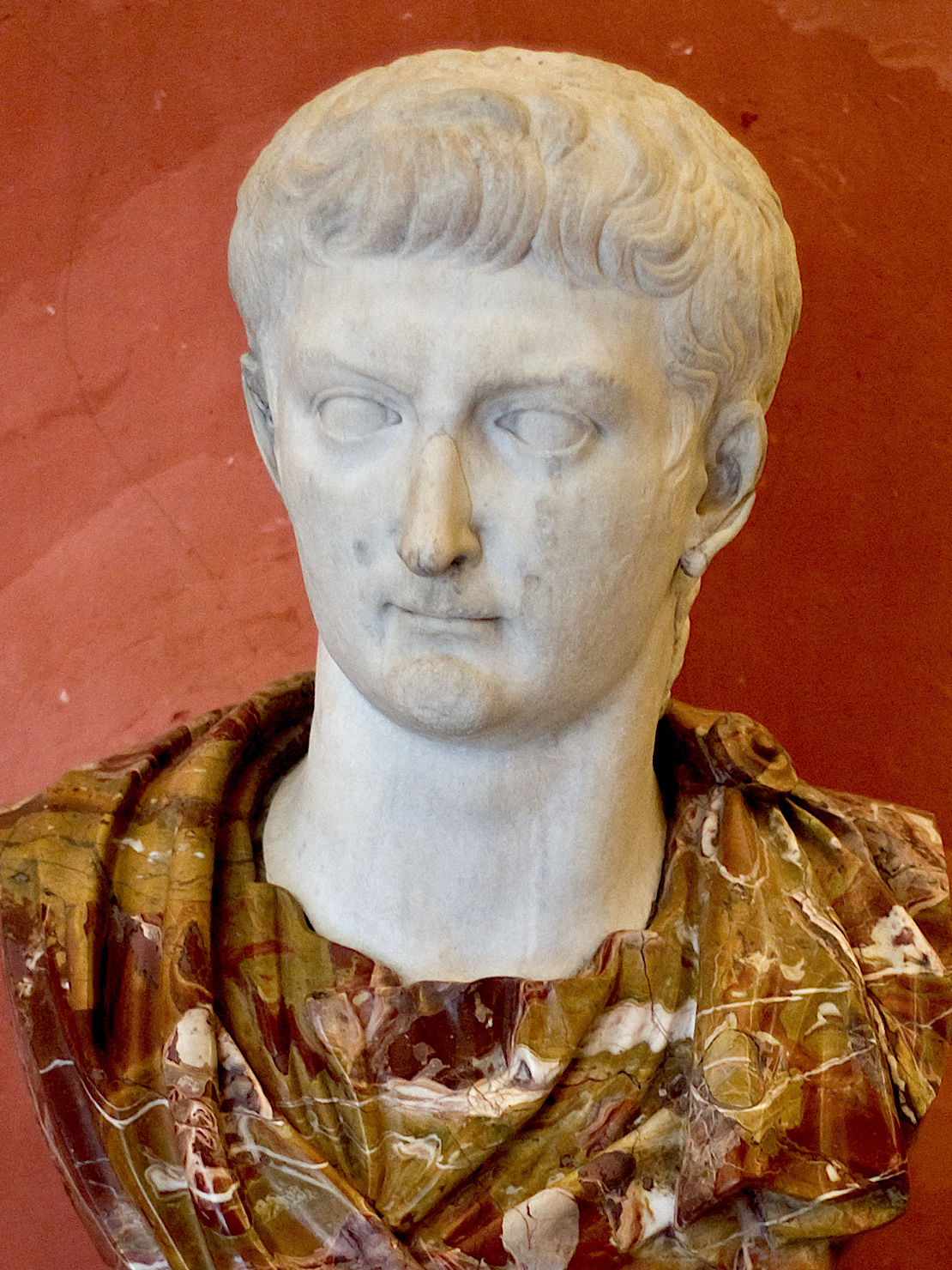
Tiberius Caesar Augustus, second Roman emperor

The gens Claudia (Latin: [ˈkɫau̯di.a]), sometimes written Clodia, was one of the most prominent patrician houses of ancient Rome. The gens traced its origin to the earliest days of the Roman Republic. The first of the Claudii to obtain the consulship was Appius Claudius Sabinus Regillensis, in 495 BC, and from that time its members frequently held the highest offices of the state, both under the Republic and in imperial times.

Plebeian Claudii are found fairly early in Rome's history. Some may have been descended from members of the family who had passed over to the plebeians, while others were probably the descendants of freedmen of the gens. In the later Republic, one of its patrician members voluntarily converted to plebeian status and adopted the spelling "Clodius".

In his life of the emperor Tiberius, who was a scion of the Claudii, the historian Suetonius gives a summary of the gens, and says, "as time went on it was honoured with twenty-eight consulships, five dictatorships, seven censorships, six triumphs, and two ovations." Writing several decades after the fall of the so-called "Julio-Claudian dynasty", Suetonius took care to mention both the good and wicked deeds attributed to members of the family.

The patrician Claudii were noted for their pride and arrogance, and intense hatred of the commonalty. In his History of Rome, Niebuhr writes,

That house during the course of centuries produced several very eminent, few great men; hardly a single noble-minded one. In all ages it distinguished itself alike by a spirit of haughty defiance, by disdain for the laws, and iron hardness of heart.

During the Republic, no patrician Claudius adopted a member of another gens; the emperor Claudius was the first who broke this custom, by adopting Lucius Domitius Ahenobarbus, later known as the emperor Nero.

== Origin ==
According to legend, the first of the Claudii was a Sabine, by the name of Attius Clausus, who came to Rome with his retainers in 504 BC, the sixth year of the Republic. (Note: Various sources give several variations of his original praenomen and nomen, including Attius Clausus, Atta Claudius, and Titus Claudius.) At this time, the fledgling Republic was engaged in regular warfare with the Sabines, and Clausus is said to have been the leader of a faction seeking to end the conflict. When his efforts failed, he defected to the Romans, bringing with him no fewer than five hundred men able to bear arms, according to Dionysius.

Clausus, who exchanged his Sabine name for the Latin Appius Claudius, was enrolled among the patricians, and given a seat in the Senate, quickly becoming one of its most influential members. (Note: An alternative tradition, mentioned by Suetonius, asserted that the Claudii came to Rome with the Sabine king Titus Tatius, during the reign of Romulus, the founder and first King of Rome.) His descendants were granted a burial site at the foot of the Capitoline Hill, and his followers allotted land on the far side of the Anio, where they formed the core of what became the "Old Claudian" tribe.

The emperor Claudius is said to have referred to these traditions in a speech made before the senate, in which he argued in favor of admitting Gauls to that body. "My ancestors, the most ancient of whom was made at once a citizen and a noble of Rome, encourage me to govern by the same policy of transferring to this city all conspicuous merit, wherever found." By imperial times, the influence of the Claudii was so great that the poet Virgil flattered them by a deliberate anachronism. In his Aeneid, he makes Attius Clausus a contemporary of Aeneas, to whose side he rallies with a host of quirites, or spearmen. (Note: "Lo! Clausus of old Sabine blood, who leads a mighty host, himself a host in might! From whom the Claudian tribe and clan to-day, since Rome was with the Sabine shared, spreads wide through Latium....)

The nomen Claudius, originally Clausus, is usually said to be derived from the Latin adjective claudus, meaning "lame". As a cognomen, Claudus is occasionally found in other gentes. However, since there is no tradition that any of the early Claudii were lame, the nomen might refer to some ancestor of Attius Clausus. It could also have been metaphorical, or ironic, and the possibility remains that this derivation is erroneous. The change from Clausus to Claudius, and its common by-form, Clodius, involves the alternation of "o" and "au", which seems to have been common in words of Sabine origin. The alternation of "s" and "d" occurs in words borrowed from Greek: Latin rosa from Greek rhodon; but in this instance clausus or *closus is a Sabine word becoming clod- in Latin. The name could have come from Greek settlers in Latium, but there is no evidence in favor of this hypothesis.

== Praenomina ==
The early Claudii favored the praenomina Appius, Gaius, and Publius. These names were used by the patrician Claudii throughout their history. Tiberius was used by the family of the Claudii Nerones, while Marcus, although used occasionally by the earliest patrician Claudii, was favored by the plebeian branches of the family. According to Suetonius, the gens avoided the praenomen Lucius because two early members with this name had brought dishonor upon the family, one having been convicted of highway robbery, and the other of murder. However, the name was used by at least one branch of the Claudii in the final century of the Republic, including one who, as Rex Sacrorum, was certainly patrician. To these names, the plebeian Claudii added Quintus and Sextus, though Elizabeth Rawson has argued that Quintus was acceptable among the Pulchri as well.

The praenomen Appius is often said to have been unique to the Claudii, and nothing more than a Latinization of the Sabine Attius. But in fact there are other figures in Roman history named "Appius", and in later times the name was used by plebeian families such as the Junii and the Annii. Thus, it seems more accurate to say that the Claudii were the only patrician family at Rome known to have used Appius. As for its Sabine equivalent, Attius has been the subject of much discussion by philologists. The form Attus is mentioned by Valerius Maximus, who connected it with the bucolic Greek name Atys. Braasch translated it as Väterchen, "little father," and connected it with a series of childhood parental names: "atta, tata, acca," and the like, becoming such names as Tatius (also Sabine) and Atilius.

During the late Republic and early Empire, the Claudii Nerones, who gave rise to the Imperial family, adopted the praenomen Decimus, seldom used by any patrician family. Subsequently they began to exchange traditional praenomina for names that first entered the family as cognomina, such as Nero, Drusus, and Germanicus.

== Branches and cognomina ==
The patrician Claudii bore various surnames, including Caecus, Caudex, Centho, Crassus, Nero, Pulcher, Regillensis, and Sabinus. The latter two, though applicable to all of the gens, were seldom used when there was a more definite cognomen. A few of the patrician Claudii are mentioned without any surname. The surnames of the plebeian Claudii were Asellus, Canina, Centumalus, Cicero, Flamen, Glaber, and Marcellus.

The earliest Claudii bore the surname Sabinus, a common surname usually referring to a Sabine, or someone of Sabine descent, which according to all tradition, the Claudii were. (Note: Presumably, the Claudii were proud of their Sabine heritage, and used this surname to assert their ethnic identity.) This cognomen was first adopted by Appius Claudius, the founder of the gens, and was retained by his descendants, until it was replaced by Crassus.

Regillensis or Inregillensis, a surname of the earliest Claudii, is said to be derived from the town of Regillum, a Sabine settlement, where Appius Claudius lived with his family and retainers before coming to Rome. Its exact location is unknown, but it must have been in the vicinity of Lake Regillus, where one of the most important battles in the early history of the Roman Republic was fought. The same cognomen was borne by a family of the Postumii, although in this instance the surname is supposed to have been derived from the Battle of Lake Regillus, in which the victorious Roman general was the dictator Aulus Postumius Albus.

Crassus, sometimes given as the diminutive Crassinus, was a common surname usually translated as "thick, solid", or "dull". This cognomen succeeded that of Sabinus as the surname of the main family of the Claudia gens. It was borne by members of the family from the fifth to the third century BC. The other main families of the patrician Claudii were descended from Appius Claudius Caecus, the last recorded member of the Claudii Crassi, who gave a different cognomen to each of his four sons: Russus (or Rufus), Pulcher, Cento or Centho, and Nero.

Pulcher, the surname of the next major branch of the Claudia gens, means beautiful, although it may be that the cognomen was given ironically. The Claudii Pulchri were an extensive family, which supplied the Republic with several consuls, and survived into imperial times.

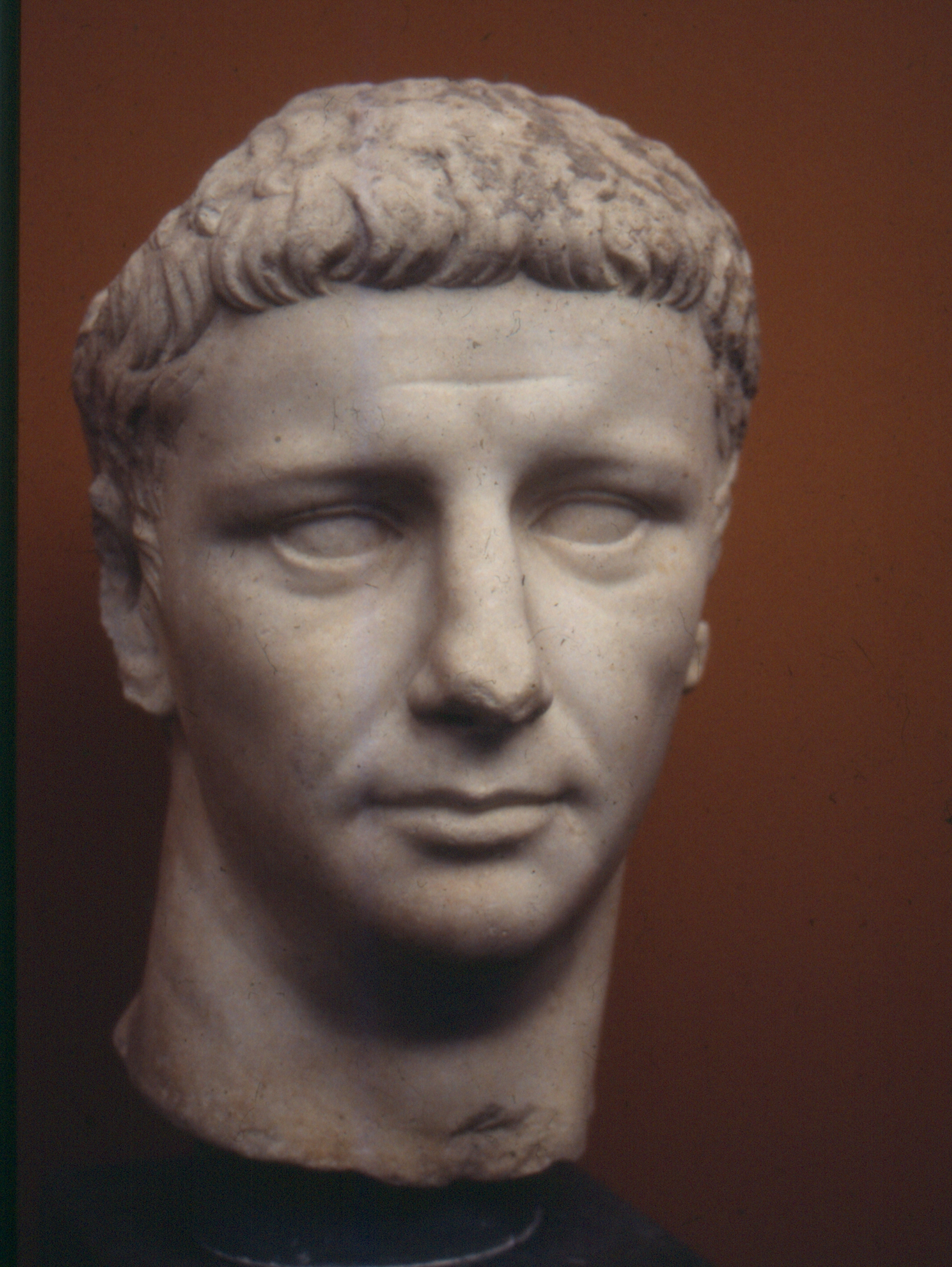
Claudius, fourth Roman emperor

The other main branch of the patrician Claudii bore the surname Nero, originally a Sabine praenomen described as meaning, fortis ac strenuus, which roughly translated is "strong and sturdy." It may be the same as the Umbrian praenomen Nerius. This family was distinguished throughout the latter Republic, and gave rise to several of the early emperors, including Tiberius, Claudius, and Nero. An oddity of the names by which these emperors are known today is that several of their ancestors bore the name Tiberius Claudius Nero; of three emperors belonging to the same family, one is known by a praenomen, one by a nomen, and one by a cognomen. Some members of the imperial family adopted the fashion of wearing their hair short at the sides and front but long in the back, over the nape of the neck. Describing the appearance of Tiberius, Suetonius calls it a family trait. This style visible on some busts of Tiberius and Caligula, his grandnephew and successor.

The most illustrious family of the plebeian Claudii bore the surname Marcellus, which is a diminutive of the praenomen Marcus. They gained everlasting fame from the exploits of Marcus Claudius Marcellus, one of Rome's finest generals, and a towering figure of the Second Punic War. He was five times consul, and won the spolia opima, defeating and killing the Gallic king, Viridomarus, in single combat.

Most of those who used the spelling Clodius were descended from plebeian members of the gens, but one family by this name was a cadet branch of the patrician Claudii Pulchri, which voluntarily went over to the plebeians, and used the spelling Clodius to differentiate themselves from their patrician relatives.

Caecus, the surname of one of the Claudii Crassi, refers to the condition of his blindness, which is well-attested, although it appears that he did not become blind until his old age. Caecus' initial cognomen was Crassus. According to one legend, he was struck blind by the gods during his censorship, after inducing the ancient family of the Potitii to teach the sacred rites of Hercules to the public slaves. The Potitii themselves were said to have perished as a result of this sacrilege. However, Claudius was relatively young at the time of his censorship in 312 BC, and was elected consul sixteen years later, in 296.

Caecus' brother, who shared the same praenomen, was distinguished by the cognomen Caudex, literally meaning a "treetrunk", although metaphorically it was an insult, meaning a "dolt." According to Seneca, he obtained the surname from his attention to naval affairs.

== Members ==
This list includes abbreviated praenomina. For an explanation of this practice, see filiation.

=== Claudii Sabini et Crassi ===
- Marcus Clausus, the father of Appius Claudius.
- Appius Claudius M. f. Sabinus Regillensis, consul in 495 BC. Born Attius Clausus, a Sabine; brought his family and retainers to Rome in 504 BC, and was admitted to the patriciate.
- Appius Claudius Ap. f. M. n. Sabinus Regillensis, consul in 471 BC, he was sent against the Aequi and Volsci, but his own soldiers revolted, and were punished with decimation. He fiercely opposed the agrarian law first brought forward by Spurius Cassius Vecellinus, and was brought to trial, but took his own life.
- Gaius Claudius Ap. f. M. n. Sabinus Regillensis, consul in 460 BC, the year that Appius Herdonius seized the Capitol. He was a staunch opponent of various laws and reforms favoring the plebeians.
- Appius Claudius Ap. f. Ap. n. Crassus, consul in 451 BC, he became head of the college of decemvirs, holding office until 449, when he was imprisoned for his actions as decemvir, and either killed himself or was put to death. (Note: The Capitoline Fasti assign him the filiation Ap. f. M. n., apparently making him identical with the consul of 471, but this may be a mistake, as the weight of tradition is against it, and the Fasti are thought to contain numerous errors and later emendations.)
- Appius Claudius Ap. f. Ap. n. Crassus, consular tribune in 424 BC, said by Livy to have been violently opposed to the plebeians and their tribunes.
- Publius Claudius Ap. f. Ap. n. Crassus, the younger son of the decemvir.
- Appius Claudius P. f. Ap. n. Crassus Regillensis, consular tribune in 403 BC, during the siege of Veii. He proposed a law allowing one of the tribunes of the plebs to halt the proceedings of the others.
- Appius Claudius P. f. Ap. n. Crassus Regillensis, opposed the Licinian Rogations, opening the consulship to the plebeians. In 362 BC, he was appointed dictator to conduct the war against the Hernici. Consul in 349, he died at the commencement of his year of office.
- Gaius Claudius (Ap. f. P. n.) Regillensis, nominated dictator in 337 BC, but immediately resigned after the augurs pronounced the appointment invalid.
- Appius Claudius C. f. Ap. n. Caecus, censor in 312 BC, and consul in 307 and 296. It was in his hands that the office of censor gained much more power and prestige; he was once dictator, but the year is unknown. Unlike most of his house, Caecus supported several reforms in favour of the plebeians. He is the earliest known Roman writer of prose and verse. Ordered the construction of the Appian Way, the oldest major Roman road, and the Aqua Appia, the first Roman aqueduct.
- Appius Claudius C. f. Ap. n. Caudex, consul in 264 BC, at the beginning of the First Punic War; landing in Sicily, he defeated Hiero and the Carthaginians, and raised the siege of Messana.
- Appius Claudius Ap. f. C. n. Russus, the eldest son of Appius Claudius Caecus, was consul in 268 BC, and triumphed over the Picentes. He died during his year of office.
- Claudia, the sister of Publius Claudius Pulcher and daughter of Appius Claudius Caecus. She was tried for maiestas and forced to pay a fine.
- Claudia, the name of five daughters of Appius Claudius Caecus.

=== Claudii Pulchri ===
- Publius Claudius Ap. f. C. n. Pulcher, the second son of Appius Claudius Caecus, consul in 249 BC; ignoring the auguries, he attacked the Carthaginian fleet at Drepana, and was entirely defeated. Recalled to Rome, he nominated Marcus Claudius Glicia, the son of a freedman, as dictator. He was subsequently impeached and fined.
- Appius Claudius P. f. Ap. n. Pulcher, consul in 212 BC, during the Second Punic War; with his colleague laid siege to Capua. His command was prolonged after his year of office, and he was mortally wounded in battle with Hannibal.
- Quinta Claudia P. f. Ap. n., freed a grounded ship bringing the image of Cybele to Rome.
- Claudia P. f. Ap. n., married Pacuvius Calavius of Capua.
- Appius Claudius Ap. f. P. n. Pulcher, consul in 185 BC.
- Publius Claudius Ap. f. P. n. Pulcher, consul in 184 BC.
- Gaius Claudius Ap. f. P. n. Pulcher, consul in 177 BC, received Istria as his province; he was censor in 169.
- Appius Claudius Ap. f. Ap. n. Pulcher, consul in 143 BC, and censor in 136. He defeated the Salassi, but was refused a triumph by the senate, and triumphed at his own expense.
- Gaius Claudius Pulcher, consul in 130 BC, reported to the senate about the disturbances excited by Gaius Papirius Carbo.
- Gaius Claudius Pulcher, probably the elder son of Gaius Claudius Pulcher, consul in 130 BC.
- Appius Claudius Pulcher, probably the younger son of Gaius Claudius Pulcher, consul in 130 BC.
- Appius Claudius Ap. f. Ap. n. Pulcher, son of the consul of 143 BC, in 107 he participated in the discussions respecting the agrarian law of Spurius Thorius.
- Claudia Ap. f. Ap. n., daughter Appius Claudius Pulcher, consul in 143 BC, was a Vestal Virgin, and accompanied her father during his triumph.
- Claudia Ap. f. Ap. n., another daughter of Appius Claudius Pulcher, consul in 143 BC, married Tiberius Gracchus.
- Claudia Ap. f. Ap. n., a third daughter of Appius Claudius Pulcher, consul in 143 BC, married Quintus Marcius Philippus, and was the mother of Quintus and Lucius Marcius Philippus; the latter was consul in 91 BC.
- Gaius Claudius Ap. f. C. n. Pulcher, consul in 92 BC.
- Appius Claudius (Ap. f. C. n.) Pulcher, military tribune in 87 BC, is probably to be identified with the interrex of 77 BC.
- Appius Claudius Ap. f. C. n. Pulcher, consul in 79 BC.
- Appius Claudius Ap. f. Ap. n. Pulcher, praetor in 89 BC.
- Gaius Claudius Ap. f. Ap. n. Pulcher, praetor in 73 BC, was defeated by Spartacus at Mount Vesuvius.
- Appius Claudius Pulcher, adopted by Marcus Livius Drusus, becoming Marcus Livius Drusus Claudianus, later became the father of Empress Livia.
- Appius Claudius Ap. f. Ap. n. Pulcher, consul in 54 BC, and censor in 50.
- Gaius Claudius Ap. f. Ap. n. Pulcher, praetor in 56 BC.
- Clodia Ap. f. Ap. n. Tertia, wife of Quintus Marcius Rex.
- Clodia Ap. f. Ap. n., wife of Quintus Caecilius Metellus Celer and controversial lady of the late Republic
- Clodia Ap. f. Ap. n., wife of Lucius Licinius Lucullus.
- Publius Clodius Ap. f. Ap. n. Pulcher, contrived to become tribune of the plebs; he was adopted by a plebeian, and affected the nomen Clodius, obtaining the tribunician power in 58 BC.
- Claudia Ap. f. Ap. n., older daughter of the consul of 54 BC, she was wife of Gnaeus Pompeius Magnus
- Claudia Ap. f. Ap. n., married, around her father's consulship in 54 BC, Brutus, who later divorced her without explanation.
- Gaius Claudius C. f. Ap. n. Pulcher, adopted by his uncle, Appius, whose praenomen he assumed. He and his brother prosecuted Titus Annius Milo in 51 BC. He is probably the same Appius Claudius Pulcher who was consul in 38 BC, but that may have been his brother.
- Appius Claudius C. f. Ap. n. Pulcher, joined his brother in prosecuting Milo; he was later impeached for extortion by the Servilii.
- Claudia P. f. Ap. n., daughter of the tribune Clodius and Fulvia; she was the first wife of Octavian (later emperor Augustus)
- Publius Claudius P. f. Ap. n. Pulcher, son of the tribune Clodius and Fulvia; he was a child at the time of his father's death. His life was spent in gluttony and debauchery, and he died young.
- Appius Claudius Ap. f. (Ap. or C. n.) (Pulcher), a senator in 25 BC, probably the one of that name whom Augustus condemned for being a lover of Julia.
- Appius Claudius Pulcher, (adopted as Marcus Valerius Messalla Appianus) the consul of 12 BC
- (Claudius P. f. P. n.) Pulcher, triumvir of the mint around 11 to 8 BC, probably a grandson of the tribune Clodius.
- Claudia, Ap. f., presumed ancestress of Junia Claudilla and Appius Junius Silanus
- Claudia, Ap. f., wife of Publius Sulpicius Quirinius
- Claudia Pulchra, wife of Publius Quinctilius Varus, was convicted of immorality and plotting against Tiberius.

=== Claudii Centhones ===
- Gaius Claudius Ap. f. C. n. Centho, the third son of Appius Claudius Caecus, he was consul in 240 BC, and dictator in 213.
- Gaius Claudius (C. f. Ap. n.) Centho, probably the father of the brothers Gaius and Appius.
- Gaius Claudius (C. f. C. n.) Centho, served under the consul Publius Sulpicius Galba in 200 BC, during the war with Philip. He successfully raised the siege of Athens, compelling Philip to take the field.
- Appius Claudius (C. f. C. n.) Centho, praetor in 175 BC, received Hispania Citerior as his province; he defeated the Celtiberi, and received an ovation.

=== Claudii Nerones ===
- Tiberius Claudius Ap. f. C. n. Nero, the fourth son of Appius Claudius Caecus.
- Tiberius Claudius Ti. f. (Ap. n.) Nero, father of the consul of 207 BC.
- Publius Claudius Ti. f. (Ap. n.) Nero, father of the consul of 202 BC.
- Gaius Claudius Ti. f. Ti. n. Nero, consul in 207 BC; with his colleague, triumphed over Hasdrubal at the Battle of the Metaurus. He was censor in 204.
- Tiberius Claudius P. f. Ti. n. Nero, consul in 202 BC, had Africa as his province; but his fleet was delayed by storms, and he was forced to winter in Sardinia until the expiration of his year of office.
- Appius Claudius Nero, praetor in 195 BC, obtained Hispania Ulterior as his province; in 189 he was one of ten envoys sent into Asia, in order to settle affairs.
- Tiberius Claudius (Ti. f. Ti. n.) Nero, praetor in 181 BC, obtained the province of Sicily.
- Tiberius Claudius Nero, praetor in 178 and 167 BC.
- Publius Claudius Nero, officer in 125 BC.
- Gaius Claudius P. f. Nero, proconsul of Asia in 79 BC.
- Appius Claudius Nero, great-great grandfather of emperor Tiberius.
- Tiberius Claudius Ap. f. Nero, great-grandfather of emperor Tiberius.
- Tiberius Claudius Ti. f. Ap. n. Nero, grandfather of the emperor Tiberius, was praetor about 67 BC, the year in which he served under Pompeius during the War against the Pirates. Four years later, he recommended that the conspirators of Catiline be held until the plot was suppressed, and the facts were known.
- Claudia, the aunt of Tiberius, was the wife of Quintus Volusius.
- Tiberius Claudius Ti. f. Ti. n. Nero, the father of Tiberius, was praetor circa 42 BC; he subsequently joined the consul Lucius Antonius during the Perusine War.
- Tiberius Claudius Ti. f. Ti. n. Nero, the future emperor Tiberius, was adopted by Augustus, becoming Tiberius Julius Caesar.
- Decimus Claudius Ti. f. Ti. n. Drusus, afterwards Nero Claudius Drusus, was consul in 9 BC, and father of the emperor Claudius.
- Nero Claudius D. f. Ti. n. Drusus Germanicus, better known as "Germanicus", (Note: The original name of Germanicus is nowhere attested. Many historians tentatively assumed that, by default, he bore the same name as his father, Nero Claudius Drusus, and this is the form used here. This is not a necessary assumption, however, since the emperor Tiberius named his son after his brother rather than himself. There is also a suggestion that Germanicus's name was Tiberius Claudius Nero, but his younger brother, Claudius, also had the forename Tiberius.) was the nephew of Tiberius. Consul in AD 12, he triumphed over the Pannonians and Dalmatians.
- Claudia D. f. Ti. n. Livia, better known as "Livilla", was the niece of Tiberius. She married first, Gaius Caesar; second, her cousin Drusus, the son of Tiberius, whom she poisoned.
- Tiberius Claudius D. f. Ti. n. Drusus, the nephew of Tiberius, would follow his own nephew, Caligula, as "Claudius", the fourth Roman emperor, from AD 41 to 54.
- Nero Claudius Ti. f. Ti. n. Drusus, afterward Drusus Julius Caesar or "Drusus the Younger", was the son of Tiberius. He was consul in AD 15 and 21, but was subsequently poisoned by his wife, Livilla, at the bidding of Sejanus.
- (Tiberius) Claudius Ti. f. D. n. Drusus, the son of Claudius, died in childhood.
- Claudia (Ti. f. D. n.) Antonia, daughter of the emperor Claudius and Aelia Paetina; married first, Gnaeus Pompeius Magnus, a descendant of the original Gnaeus Pompeius Magnus; second, her cousin Faustus Cornelius Sulla Felix. She and Sulla were executed by Nero's order in AD 66.
- Claudia (Ti. f. D. n.) Octavia, daughter of the emperor Claudius and Valeria Messalina; full-sister of Britannicus; married her step-brother, the emperor Nero; divorced; later banished and supposedly murdered by Nero's orders in 62.
- Tiberius Claudius Ti. f. D. n. Germanicus, better known as "Britannicus", was the son and natural heir of the emperor Claudius. His stepmother, Agrippina, ensured the succession of her own son, the future emperor Nero, by persuading him to poison his stepbrother.
- Nero Claudius Caesar Drusus Germanicus, the emperor Nero, reigned from AD 54 to 68; he was born "Lucius Domitius Ahenobarbus", the son of Gnaeus Domitius Ahenobarbus and Agrippina, but was adopted by Claudius in AD 50, after the emperor had married Nero's mother.
- Claudia Augusta, an infant daughter of the emperor Nero and Poppaea Sabina. She died in infancy in AD 63.

=== Claudii Marcelli ===
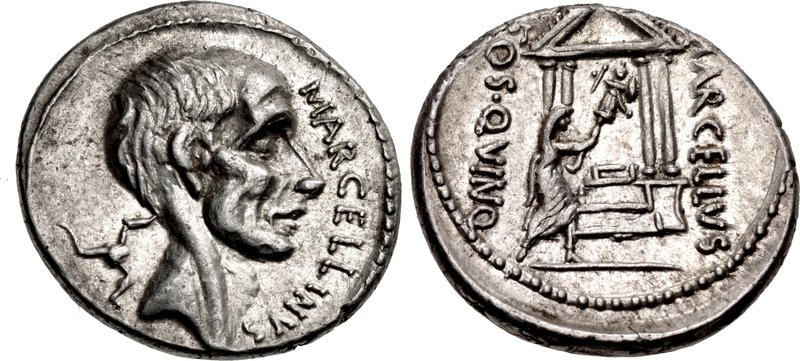
Denarius of Publius Cornelius Lentulus Marcellinus, 50 BC, honouring his ancestor Claudius Marcellus, portrayed on the obverse. The triskeles behind his head alludes to his capture of Syracuse in 212 BC. The reverse shows him putting his spolia opima into a temple. The legend COS QVINQ refers to his five consulships.

- Gaius Claudius (Marcellus), grandfather of Marcus Claudius Marcellus, the consul of 331 BC.
- Gaius Claudius C. f. (Marcellus), the father of Marcus Claudius Marcellus.
- Marcus Claudius C. f. C. n. Marcellus, consul in 331 BC; he was appointed dictator in order to hold the elections in 327, but was prevented from doing so by the augurs, who apparently objected to a plebeian dictator.
- Marcus Claudius (M. f. C. n) Marcellus, consul in 287 BC.
- Marcus Claudius M. f. (M. n.) Marcellus, father of the consul of 222 BC.
- Marcus Claudius M. f. M. n. Marcellus, consul in 222, 215, 214, 210, and 208 BC, the great hero of the Second Punic War.
- Marcus Claudius Marcellus, plebeian aedile in 216 BC.
- Marcus Claudius M. f. M. n. Marcellus, praetor in 198 BC, was assigned the province of Sicily. As consul in 196, he triumphed over the Boii and Ligures.
- Marcus Claudius M. f. M. n. Marcellus, praetor urbanus in 188 BC, and consul in 183.
- Marcus Claudius Marcellus, praetor in 185 BC.
- Marcus Claudius Marcellus, tribune of the plebs in 171 BC.
- Marcus Claudius M. f. M. n. Marcellus, consul in 166, 155, and 152 BC; triumphed over the Alpine Gauls and the Ligures.
- Marcus Claudius M. f. M. n. Marcellus, son of the consul of 166 BC.
- Marcus Claudius Marcellus, praetor in 137 BC, was killed by lightning during his year of office.
- Marcus Claudius Marcellus, a lieutenant of Lucius Julius Caesar during the Social War; he held the fortress of Aesernia in Samnium for some time, but was ultimately compelled to surrender. He was a rival of the orator Lucius Licinius Crassus.
- Marcus Claudius M. f. M. n. Marcellus, curule aedile in 91 BC.
- Gaius Claudius M. f. M. n. Marcellus, praetor in 80 BC, and afterwards governor of Sicily; the mildness and justice of his administration was contrasted with that of his predecessor, and subsequently that of Verres.
- Marcus Claudius M. f. Marcellus Aeserninus, a young man who appeared as a witness at the trial of Verres, in 70 BC.
- Claudius M. f. Marcellus, the brother of Marcellus Aeserninus, he was adopted by one of the Cornelii Lentuli, and became Publius Cornelius Lentulus Marcellinus. He fought under Pompeius during the war against the pirates, in 67 BC, and was an orator of considerable merit. For his descendants, see Cornelia gens.
- Marcus Claudius Marcellus, one of the conspirators with Catiline in 63 BC. On the discovery of the plot, he attempted to instigate an insurrection amongst the Paeligni, but was defeated by the praetor, Marcus Calpurnius Bibulus, and put to death.
- Gaius Claudius M. f. Marcellus, son of the conspirator, also took part in Catiline's conspiracy, and attempted to instigate a slave revolt at Capua, but was driven out by Publius Sestius, and took refuge in Bruttium, where he was put to death.
- Marcus Claudius Marcellus, consul in 51 BC, and a respected orator; he joined Pompeius during the Civil War, but was subsequently pardoned by Caesar.
- Gaius Claudius C. f. M. n. Marcellus, consul in 50 BC; he supported Pompeius, investing him with the command against Caesar during the Civil War; but he remained at Rome and obtained Caesar's pardon for himself and his cousin, Marcus.
- Gaius Claudius M. f. M. n. Marcellus, consul in 49 BC; he was a partisan of Pompeius, and probably died in the Civil War. He is frequently confused with his cousin, who was consul in the preceding year.
- Marcus Claudius M. f. (M. n.) Marcellus Aeserninus, quaestor in Hispania in 48 BC, he was sent by Gaius Cassius Longinus to put down a revolt at Corduba, but joined the revolt and went over to Caesar, placing his legions under the command of Marcus Aemilius Lepidus.
- Claudia Marcella Major, elder daughter of the consul of 49 BC
- Claudia Marcella Minor, younger daughter of the consul of 49 BC
- Marcus Claudius C. f. C. n. Marcellus, nephew of Augustus and stepson of Marcus Antonius; he married his cousin, Julia. He was curule aedile in 23 BC. but died that autumn.
- Marcus Claudius M. f. M. n. Marcellus Aeserninus, consul in 22 BC, possibly the same as the Marcellus who served under Lepidus during the Civil War.
- Marcus Claudius M. f. M. n. Marcellus Aeserninus, the son of Aeserninus, consul in 22 BC, was trained as an orator by his grandfather, Gaius Asinius Pollio.
- Marcus Claudius Marcellus Aeserninus, praetor in 19 AD, he married a Calvisia Flaccilla.

=== Claudii Caninae ===
- Gaius Claudius Canina, grandfather of Gaius Claudius Canina, the consul of 285 BC.
- Marcus Claudius C. f. Canina, the father of Gaius Claudius Canina.
- Gaius Claudius M. f. C. n. Canina, consul in 285 and 273 BC.

=== Claudii Aselli ===
- Tiberius Claudius Asellus, a military tribune under Gaius Claudius Nero, the consul in 207 BC, during the Second Punic War; the following year he was praetor, and obtained Sardinia as his province. He was tribune of the plebs in 204.
- Tiberius Claudius Asellus, an eques who was deprived of his horse and reduced to the condition of an aerarian by the censor Scipio Aemilianus in 142 BC; he was subsequently restored by Scipio's colleague, Lucius Mummius, and as tribune of the plebs in 140 he accused Scipio.

=== Claudii Pompeiani ===
- Tiberius Claudius Pompeianus, consul in AD 173, and probably consul suffectus in 176; he married Lucilla, the daughter of Marcus Aurelius.
- Claudius Quintianus Pompeianus, a young senator, and the son-in-law of Tiberius Claudius Pompeianus and Lucilla; persuaded by Lucilla to attempt to kill her brother, the emperor Commodus, he failed and was put to death.
- Lucius Aurelius Commodus Pompeianus, consul in AD 209, perhaps the son of Tiberius Claudius Pompeianus.
- Tiberius Claudius Pompeianus Quintianus, consul suffectus in AD 212, perhaps the son of Tiberius Claudius Pompeianus.
- Claudius Pompeianus, consul in AD 231.
- Lucius Tiberius Claudius Aurelius Quintianus (Pompeianus), triumvir monetalis circa AD 222, and a candidate for quaestor in 228; he was praetor in 233, and consul in 235.
- Clodius Pompeianus, consul in AD 241, with the emperor Gordianus III. In 244, he was curator aedium sacrarum.

=== Others ===
- Gaius Claudius Cicero, in some manuscripts of Livy, tribune of the plebs in 454 BC; he prosecuted Titus Romilius, the consul of the preceding year, for selling the spoils of the war with the Aequi without the permission of the soldiers. In other manuscripts his nomen is Calvius.
- Gaius Claudius Hortator, appointed magister equitum by the dictator Gaius Claudius Crassus in 337 BC.
- Marcus Claudius C. f. Glicia, the son of a freedman, was nominated dictator by Publius Claudius Pulcher, following the Battle of Drepana in 249 BC. Glicia's appointment was immediately superseded, but nonetheless recorded in the Fasti consulares. In 236 he was legate to the consul Gaius Licinius Varus, (Note: Some sources identify the legate of 236 BC as Marcus Claudius Clineas. His fate is uncertain; he is said to have been delivered up to the Corsi, who returned him unharmed. According to various authorities he was then imprisoned, banished, or put to death.) but punished for entering into an unauthorized treaty with the Corsi.
- Quintus Claudius, tribune of the plebs in 218 BC; probably the same person as Quintus Claudius Flamen, praetor in 208.
- Quintus Claudius Flamen, praetor in 208 BC, and subsequently propraetor in the territory of the Sallentini and Tarentum, during the Second Punic War.
- Lucius Claudius, praetor in 174 BC, assigned the province of Sicily.
- Quintus Claudius Ap. f., a senator in 129 BC.
- Tiberius Claudius Centumalus, sued for fraud involving the sale of property to Publius Calpurnius Lanarius; judgment against Claudius was given by Marcus Porcius Cato, the father of Cato Uticensis.
- Gaius Claudius C. f. Glaber, (Note: Plutarch and Frontinus call him Clodius, while Appian mixes his name with another praetor, calling him Varinius Glaber.) praetor in 73 BC, was defeated by Spartacus. He might have been related to the Claudii Marcelli, as he belonged to the tribus Arniensis, like Marcus Claudius Marcellus, the aedile of 91.
- Lucius Claudius L. f., a senator in 73 BC, perhaps the father and predecessor of Lucius Claudius, the Rex Sacrorum.
- Lucius Claudius (L. f. L. n.), Rex Sacrorum before 60 BC. (Note: Taylor conjectures that he was the son of the homonymous senator of 73, whom she also thinks he was Rex Sacrorum. She suggests that they both belonged to a minor stirps of the patrician Claudii, who filled religious offices that few others sought, since their holders could not hold any other magistracy.)
- Quintus Claudius Quadrigarius, a historian of the early first century BC, he wrote a history of Rome from the sack of Rome by the Gauls in 390 BC to the death of Sulla.
- Sextus Clodius, a Sicilian rhetorician, under whom Marcus Antonius studied oratory, and who in turn received a large estate in the Leontine territory.
- Lucius Clodius, praefectus fabrum to Appius Claudius Pulcher, consul in 54 BC; he was tribune of the plebs in 43.
- Gaius Claudius, probably the descendant of a freedman of the Claudian house, was one of the suite of Publius Clodius Pulcher on his last journey to Aricia.
- Publius Clodius M. f., probably the Clodius sent into Macedonia by Caesar in 48 BC, and the same as Clodius Bithynicus, who fought on the side of Antonius in the Perusine War, and was put to death by order of Octavian in 40.
- Appius Claudius C. f., mentioned by Cicero in a letter to Brutus; he attached himself to the party of Marcus Antonius, who had restored his father. It is uncertain whether he can be identified with either of two persons of this name who were proscribed by the triumvirs.
- Sextus Clodius, the accomplice of Publius Clodius Pulcher, after whose death he was exiled; he was restored by Marcus Antonius in 44 BC. He may actually have been a Sextus Cloelius.
- Gaius Claudius, a follower of Marcus Junius Brutus, who ordered him to put Gaius Antonius to death; afterwards he was sent to Rhodes in command of a squadron, and after his patron's death, he joined Cassius Parmensis.
- Gaius Clodius Licinus, consul suffectus in AD 4.
- Tiberius Claudius Thrasyllus, Greek Egyptian astrologer and friend of Tiberius, better known as Thrasyllus of Mendes. Granted Roman citizenship and adopted his patron's name.
- Tiberius Claudius Balbilus, son of Thrasyllus, astrologer to Claudius, Nero, and Vespasian.
- Claudia Capitolina, daughter of Balbilus, married Greek prince Gaius Julius Archelaus Antiochus Epiphanes.
- Tiberius Claudius Narcissus, freedman and advisor to Claudius, executed by Agrippina the Younger.
- Claudius Felix, a name assigned by some writers to Marcus Antonius Felix, a freedman of the emperor Claudius, who was later procurator of Judaea.
- Claudius Lysias, a supposed tribune and commander of the Jerusalem garrison around AD 53.
- Tiberius Claudius Verus, one of the duumvirs at Pompeii in AD 62, when an earthquake devastated the city on February 5.
- Lucius Clodius Macer, governor of Africa in AD 68, revolted against Nero, but was put to death by Galba.
- Claudius Severus, leader of the Helvetii in AD 69.
- Claudius Civilis, also known as Gaius Julius Civilis, a leader of the Batavi, who led the Batavian revolt in AD 69.
- Claudius Labeo, a leader of the Batavi, and rival of Civilis, who defeated him during the Batavian revolt.
- Claudius Iullus (or possibly Julius or Ioläus), a Roman writer who wrote a work on Phoenicia in Greek, and apparently another on the Peloponnesus, presumably before the destruction of Jerusalem. He was probably a freedman.
- Claudius Iullus, legatus pro praetore in Asia, possibly the same man as the writer.
- Claudius Athenodorus, praefectus annonae during the reign of Domitian.
- Claudius Capito, an orator, and a contemporary of the younger Pliny.
- Tiberius Claudius Sacerdos, consul suffectus in AD 100.
- Claudia Severa, the wife of Aelius Brocchus, commander of a fort in Britain early in the second century. She is known from her correspondence with Sulpicia Lepidina, the wife of Flavius Cerealis, prefect of an auxiliary unit also stationed in Britain.
- Tiberius Claudius Livianus, praetorian prefect under Trajan.
- Tiberius Claudius Maximus, a cavalryman in the Imperial Roman army who is known for presenting Trajan with the head of Dacian king Decebalus. He served in the Roman legions and Auxilia under the emperors Domitian and Trajan in the period AD 85–117.
- Marcus Clodius Catullus, equestrian governor of Mauretania Tingitana in AD 109.
- Gaius Claudius Severus, consul suffectus in AD 112.
- Lucius Catilius Severus Julianus Claudius Reginus, consul in AD 120.
- Marcus Gavius Claudius Squilla Gallicanus, consul in AD 127.
- Claudius Ptolemaeus, a Greek mathematician and astronomer of the second century.
- Tiberius Claudius Atticus Herodes, a celebrated rhetorician; consul in AD 143.
- Gnaeus Claudius Severus, consul in AD 146.
- Claudius Maximus, a stoic philosopher during the age of the Antonines.
- Claudius Saturninus, a jurist during the reigns of Antoninus Pius and Marcus Aurelius, and the author of Liber Singularis de Poenis Paganorum.
- Claudius Apollinaris, bishop of Hierapolis in Phrygia from AD 170; an early Christian apologist, he wrote to the emperor Marcus Aurelius. He also wrote against the Jews and Gentiles, as well as various doctrines considered heretical by the early church.
- Gnaeus Claudius Severus, consul in AD 173.
- Maternus Tiberius Claudius, consul in AD 185.
- Claudius Galenus, a name assigned to the physician Galen.
- Appius Claudius Lateranus, a lieutenant of the emperor Septimius Severus during his expedition against the Arabians and Parthians in AD 195. He was consul in 197.
- Claudius Tryphoninus, a jurist during the reign of Septimius Severus.
- Tiberius Claudius Severus, consul in AD 200.
- Claudius Aelianus, a scholar, rhetorician, and antiquarian of the early third century.
- Appius Claudius Julianus, consul in AD 224.
- Gnaeus Claudius Severus, consul in AD 235.
- Marcus Clodius Pupienus Maximus, emperor in AD 238.
- Titus Clodius Pupienus Pulcher Maximus, a son of the emperor Pupienus, was consul suffectus circa AD 235.
- Marcus Aurelius Claudius "Gothicus", emperor from AD 268 to 270.
- Marcus Claudius Tacitus, emperor from AD 275 to 276.
- Titus Claudius Aurelius Aristobulus, consul in AD 285.
- Claudia, supposed mother of emperor Constantius
- Claudius Eusthenius, secretary to the emperor Diocletian, he wrote lives of Diocletian, Maximian, Galerius, and Constantius.
- Claudius Mamertinus, the author of two panegyrics in honor of the emperor Maximian; the surname Mamertinus is uncertain.
- Flavius Claudius Constantinus (Constantine II), emperor from AD 337 to 340.
- Flavius Claudius Julianus, emperor from AD 361 to 363.
- Claudius Mamertinus, consul in AD 362.
- Sextus Claudius Petronius Probus, consul in AD 371.
- Claudius Antonius, consul in AD 382.
- Claudius Claudianus (Claudian), the last of the Latin classic poets, who flourished during the reigns of Theodosius I, Arcadius, and Honorius.
- Flavius Claudius Constantinus (Constantine III), emperor from AD 407 to 411.
- Claudius Julius Eclesius Dynamius, consul in AD 488.
- Claudius Didymus, a Greek grammarian, who wrote about the mistakes of Thucydides relating to analogy, a separate work about analogy among the Romans, and an epitome of the works of Heracleon.

=== Partial male-line family tree ===
List of male-line members of the Claudian family
- Appius Claudius Crassus Inregillensis, d. c. 349 BC
  - Gaius Claudius Inregillensis
    - Appius Claudius Caecus, fl. c. 312–279 BC
      - Appius Claudius Russus
      - Publius Claudius Pulcher, d. 249/246 BC
        - Appius Claudius Pulcher, d. 211 BC
          - Appius Claudius Pulcher
          - Publius Claudius Pulcher
          - Gaius Claudius Pulcher, d. 167 BC
            - Appius Claudius Pulcher, d. c. 130 BC
              - Gaius Claudius Pulcher
              - Appius Claudius Pulcher, c. 129–76 BC
                - Appius Claudius Pulcher, 97–49 BC
                - Gaius Claudius Pulcher
                  - Appius Claudius Pulcher
                - Publius Clodius Pulcher "Clodius", c. 92–52 BC
                  - Publius Claudius Pulcher, c. 60/59–31 BC
      - Gaius Claudius Centho
      - Tiberius Claudius Nero
        - Tiberius Claudius Nero
          - Gaius Claudius Nero, c. 237–189 BC
        - Publius Claudius Nero
          - Tiberius Claudius Nero
    - Appius Claudius Caudex, fl. 264 BC
- Tiberius Claudius Nero, fl. 79–63 BC
  - Tiberius Claudius Nero, c. 82–33 BC
    - Tiberius Julius Caesar Augustus "Tiberius", 42 BC – AD 37
      - Drusus Julius Caesar, c. 14 BC – AD 23
        - Tiberius Julius Caesar Nero "Gemellus", AD 19–38
    - Nero Claudius Drusus Germanicus, 38–9 BC
      - Germanicus Julius Caesar "Germanicus", 15 BC – AD 19
        - Nero Julius Caesar, c. AD 6–31
        - Drusus Caesar, c. AD 8–33
        - Gaius Caesar Augustus Germanicus "Caligula", AD 12–41
      - Tiberius Claudius Caesar Augustus Germanicus "Claudius", 10 BC – AD 54
        - Tiberius Claudius Drusus, c. AD 9/12–20/27
        - Tiberius Claudius Caesar Britannicus "Britannicus", AD 41–55

=== Male line family tree chart simplified ===
Genealogy of the Patrician Claudii During the Republic & Early Principate (no References)

Legend
| Orange | Dictator | Yellow | Censor | Green | Consul | Julii Family | Julii Caesares | Emperor | Emperor | dashed lines -- | Most probable descent | dotted lines ... | Adopted |

Marcus Clausus
Appius Claudius Crassus Inregillensis Sabinus Cos. 471, 451 BC, Dec. 451 BC | Gaius Claudius Sabinus Regillensis cos. 460 BC
Appius Claudius Crassus, con. trib. 424 BC | Publius Claudius Crassus
Appius Claudius Crassus con. trib. 403 BC | Appius Claudius Crassus Inregillensis dict. 362 BC, cos. 349 BC
C. Claudius Inregillensis nom. dict. 337
Ap. Claudius Caecus cens. 312-308 BC, cos. 307, 296, dict. c.285 | Ap. Claudius Caudexcos. 264
Son 1. Ap. Claudius Russus cos. 268, trium. viz. Picentes | Son 4. Ti. Claudius Nero | Son 2. P. Claudius Pulcher cos. 249 | Son 3. C. Claudius Centho cos 240, cens. 225 dict. 213
Ti. Claudius Nero | P. Claudius Nero | Ap. Claudius Pulcher aed. cur. 217, pr. Sicilia 215, propr. 214-213, cos. 212, procos. Capua 211 | C. Centho leg. 200
C. Claudius Nero legate 214 BC, praetor 212 BC, propraetor 211 BC cos. 207, cens. 204, vic. ova. Battle of the Metaurus, | Ti. Claudius Nero cos. 202, gov. Africa | Ap. Claudius Nero pr. 195, gov. Hispania Ulterior | Ap. Claudius Pulcher pr. 188, cos. 185, amb. 174-173 | P. Claudius Pulcher aed. cur. 189, pr. Tarentum 187, cos. 184, Liguria illvir col deduc 181 | C. Claudius Pulcher pr suff prereg. 180, cos. 177, cens. 169, aug 195, defeated Istrians and Ligurians | Ap. Claudius Centho pr. 175 | C. Claudius Centho leg. 155
Ti. Claudius Nero pr. 181, gov. Sicily | Ti. Claudius Nero pr. 178, 167, procos. 177-176 | Ti. Claudius Nero pr. 167 | Ap. Claudius Pulcher cos. suff. 130 | Clodia (or Claudia, sp. varies) | Ap. Claudius Pulcher c.185, cos. 143, cens 136, PS 136, IIIvir a.i.a. 133-130, augur † 130 | C. Claudius Centho amb. 155
Ap. Claudius Nero great-great-grandfather of Imp. Tiberius | P. Claudius Nero | Q. Claudius Pulcher | C. Claudius Pulcher (c. 136–92) pr. 95 BC, cos. 92 BC | Ap. Claudius Pulcher (c. 130–76) mon. c. 111-110, q 99, pr. 89, cos. 79, intrerex 77, d. 76 | Daughters: 1. Claudia 1 2. Claudia 3 | Claudia 2 m. 143 Ti. Semp. Gracchus
Ti. Claudius Nero mon. 79, leg. 67, pr. ante 63 | C. Claudius P.f. Nero pr. 81, procos Asia 80-79 | Ap. Claudius Pulcher (d.battle 82 BC) trib. mil. 87 | Appius Claudius Pulcher, adopted as M. Livius Drusus Claudianus pr. 50 BC, | Ap. Claudius Pulcher Major (- 48 BC) pr. 57, Sard 56, cos. 54, Cilicia 53-51, cens. 50, Greece 49-48, augur | G. Claudius Pulcher (c. 136–92) cos. 92 BC | P. Clodius Pulcher adpt. by a plebeian 59 q. Sicilia 61-60, tr. pleb. 58, aed. cur. 56 | 3 dau: 1. Clodia Tertia (eldest d): 2. Clodia; 3. Clodia
?
Ti. Claudius Nero q. 48, pr. 42, pont. 46 | L. Claudus rex sacr. 57, | Ap. Claudius Pulcher (minor) (ex. C. Claudius Pulcher ==>) ment. 52, sen. 25 | Livia Drusilla (Livia Augusta) m. Augustus | Ap. Claudius Pulcher (Major) cos. 38, triumph 32, procos. Bithy 27, Vllvir Epu, | (C. Cladius Pucher) adopt. by cousin as Ap. Claudius Pucher (Minor) <=== | Dau. 1. Claudia 1. m. Cn. Pompeius Magnus (s. of Pompey); 2. Claudia m. M. Iunius Brutus pr. 44, div 45 | P. Claudius Pulcher q. quaesitor, pr. augor by 31 | Claudia m. 43, div 41 Augustus
IMP. AUGUSTUS; Triumvir (43–27 BC), Imp. 27BC
Antonia Minor, d. of Mark Anthony & Octavia Minor s. of Augustus | Nero Claudius Drusus Germanicus (post.) gov Gaul 15-11 BC, 12-9 BC co. 9 BC | Ti. Claudius Nero==> IMP. TIBERIUS CAESAR 14 AD | ? Ap. Claudius (Pulcher)? or s. of Ap. Claudius Pucher Minor?or son of P. Clodius Pucher? sen. 25 BC | Ap. Claudius Pulcher adpt. as M. Val. Messalla Appianus sen., cos. 12 BC. | 1. Claudia; 2. Appia (Claudia) | P. Claudius Pulcher q. quaesitor, pr. augur by 31
(Claudia) Livia Iulia called Livilla | Ti. Claudius Drusus --> IMP. CLAUDIUS IMP. 41 AD | Germanicus Julius Caesar co. 12 AD, 18 AD procos. Germania, 14-16 AD, trium. 17 AD | Drusus Julius Caesar | M.Valerius Messalla Barbatus , cos. 20 AD
Nero Julius Caesar (6 - exec. 31) | Drusus Julius Caesar Germanicus (7/8 - 33 in pris.) | IMP. CAESAR AUG. GERM. CALIGULA , IMP. 37 (12-41) | Julia Agrippina or Aggippina the Younger | Julia Drusilla (16 – 38 AD) | Julia Livia (c. 18 – c. 41 AD) | Julia Livia (AD 7–43) | T. Julius Caesar Nero Gemellus (AD 19 – 37/38) | Valeria Messalina m. Imp. Claudius
wife 1. Ti. Clau. Drusus | wife 2. Claudia Antonia m. Gnaeus Pompeius Magnus Faustus Cornelius Sulla Felix | wife 3. Claudia Octavia m. Imp. Nero | wife 3. Ti. Clau. Caesar Britannicus | L. Domitius Ahenobarbus -->IMP. NERO CAESAR, IMP. 54

Genealogy of the Claudii Marcelli (Plebian) During the Republic & Early Principate

Legend
| Orange | Dictator | Yellow | Censor | Green | Consul | dashed lines -- | Most probable descent |

M. Claudius Marcellus; Cos. 331 BC
M. Claudius Marcellus; Cos. 287 BC
M. Claudius Marcellus
M. Claudius Marcellus (270 BC - 208BC), Cos. 222, 215, 214, 210, 208 BC & Gen. vs. Hannibal; Spolia opima, 222 BC, conq. Syracuse
M. Claudius Marcellus trib. plebs 204 BC, cos. 196 BC | M. Claudius Marcellus cos. 183 BC
M. Claudius Marcellus cos. 166, 155, 152 BC, trium. 155 BC
M. Claudius Marcellus
M. Claudius Marcellus aed. 91 BC | C. Claudius Marcellus pr. 80 BC | M. Claudius Marcellus leg. 90 BC
M. Claudius Marcellus cos. 51 BC opp. Caesar | C. Claudius Marcellus cos. 49 BC | G. Claudius Marcellus cos. 50 BC | Octavia the Younger s. of Augustus | M. Clau.Marcellus Aeserninus | P. Corn. Lentulus Marcellinus
Julia the Elder, d. of Augustus | M. Claudius Marcellus aed. cur. 23 BC | M. Clau.Marcellus Aeserninus qu. 48 BC | Gn. Corn. Lentulus Marcellinus cos. 56 BC
M. Clau.Marcellus Aeserninus, cos. 22 BC | P. Corn. Lentulus Marcellinus qu. 48 BC
M. Clau.Marcellus Aeserninus fl. AD 20 | P. Corn. Lentulus Marcellinuscos. 18 BC.

== See also ==
- Clodius
- List of Roman gentes
- Julio-Claudian dynasty
- List of Roman consuls

== Bibliography ==
=== Ancient sources ===
- Marcus Tullius Cicero, Brutus, De Divinatione, De Domo Sua, De Haruspicum Responsis, De Legibus, De Officiis, De Oratore, Divinatio in Quintum Caecilium, Epistulae ad Atticum, Epistulae ad Brutum, Epistulae ad Familiares, In Catilinam, In Verrem, Philippicae, Pro Caelio, Pro Milone, Pro Scauro, Pro Sestio, Pro Sulla, Tusculanae Quaestiones.
- Gaius Sallustius Crispus (Sallust), Historiae (The Histories), Bellum Catilinae (The Conspiracy of Catiline).
- Gaius Julius Caesar, Commentarii de Bello Civili (Commentaries on the Civil War).
- Dionysius of Halicarnassus, Romaike Archaiologia (Roman Antiquities).
- Titus Livius (Livy), History of Rome.
- Publius Vergilius Maro (Virgil), Aeneid.
- Publius Ovidius Naso (Ovid), Fasti.
- Valerius Maximus, Factorum ac Dictorum Memorabilium (Memorable Facts and Sayings).
- Marcus Velleius Paterculus, Compendium of Roman History.
- Quintus Asconius Pedianus, Commentarius in Oratio Ciceronis Pro Milone (Commentary on Cicero's Oration Pro Milone).
- Pseudo-Asconius, Commentarius in Oratorio Ciceronis in Verrem (Commentary on Cicero's In Verrem), ed. Orelli.
- Lucius Annaeus Seneca (Seneca the Elder), Controversiae (Epitome).
- Lucius Annaeus Seneca (Seneca the Younger), De Brevitate Vitae (On the Brevity of Life).
- Gaius Plinius Secundus (Pliny the Elder), Naturalis Historia (Natural History).
- Gaius Plinius Caecilius Secundus (Pliny the Younger), Epistulae (Letters).
- Sextus Julius Frontinus, Strategemata (Stratagems), De aquaeductu (On Aqueducts).
- Publius Cornelius Tacitus, Annales, Historiae.
- Lucius Mestrius Plutarchus (Plutarch), Lives of the Noble Greeks and Romans.
- Gaius Suetonius Tranquillus, De Vita Caesarum (Lives of the Caesars, or The Twelve Caesars), De Claris Rhetoribus (On the Eminent Orators).
- Lucius Annaeus Florus, Epitome de T. Livio Bellorum Omnium Annorum DCC (Epitome of Livy: All the Wars of Seven Hundred Years).
- Appianus Alexandrinus (Appian), Bella Mithridatica (The Mithridatic Wars), Bellum Civile (The Civil War), Bellum Hannibalicum (The War with Hannibal).
- Aulus Gellius, Noctes Atticae (Attic Nights).
- Lucius Cassius Dio Cocceianus (Cassius Dio), Roman History.
- Herodianus, Tes Meta Marcon Basileas Istoria (History of the Empire from the Death of Marcus Aurelius).
- Eusebius of Caesarea, Historia Ecclesiastica.
- Aelius Lampridius, Aelius Spartianus, Julius Capitolinus, Trebellius Pollio, Vulcatius Gallicanus, & Flavius Vopiscus, Historia Augusta (Augustan History).
- Julius Obsequens, Liber de Prodigiis (The Book of Prodigies).
- Sextus Aurelius Victor (attributed), Epitome de Caesaribus.
- Ammianus Marcellinus, Res Gestae.
- Codex Theodosianus.
- Paulus Orosius, Historiarum Adversum Paganos (History against the Pagans).
- Eusebius Sophronius Hieronymus (St. Jerome), De Viris Illustribus (On the Illustrious Men), Epistulae.
- Digesta, or Pandectae (The Digest).
- Theodoret, Haereticarum Fabularum Compendium (Compendium of Heretical Tales).
- Corpus Juris Civilis, or Codex Justinianus (The Body of Civil Law, or the Code of Justinian).
- Stephanus of Byzantium, Ethnica.
- Photius, Bibliotheca.
- Suda.
- Joannes Zonaras, Epitome Historiarum (Epitome of History).
- Nicephorus Callistus Xanthopulus, Historia Ecclesiastica.
- "Chronicon Paschale". Wikipedia.
- "Fasti Hydatiani". Catholic Encyclopedia / Oxford RE.

=== Modern sources ===
- Anthony A. Barrett, Livia: First Lady of Imperial Rome, Yale University Press (2002).
- Karl Braasch, "Lateinische Personennamen, nach ihrer Bedeutung zusammen gestellt", in Jahresbericht des Königlich Stifts-Gymnasiums in Zeitz, C. Brendel, Zeitz (1892).
- Michel Bréal and Anatole Bailly, Dictionnaire étymologique latin, Librairie Hachette, Paris (1885).
- T. Corey Brennan, The Praetorship in the Roman Republic, Oxford University Press (2000).
- T. Robert S. Broughton, The Magistrates of the Roman Republic, American Philological Association (1952–1986).
- Michael Crawford, Roman Republican Coinage, Cambridge University Press (1974, 2001).
- Wilhelm Dittenberger, Sylloge Inscriptionum Graecarum (Collection of Greek Inscriptions, abbreviated SIG), Leipzig (1883).
- Wilhelm Drumann, Geschichte Roms in seinem Übergang von der republikanischen zur monarchischen Verfassung, oder: Pompeius, Caesar, Cicero und ihre Zeitgenossen, Königsberg (1834–1844).
- Joseph Hilarius Eckhel, Doctrina Numorum Veterum (The Study of Ancient Coins, 1792–1798).
- Gary D. Farney, Ethnic Identity and Aristocratic Competition in Republican Rome, Cambridge University Press (2007).
- Endre Ferenczy, From the Patrician State to the Patricio–plebeian State, Akadémiai Kiadó/A. M. Hakkert (1976).
- Jean Foy-Vaillant, Numismata Imperatorum Romanorum Praestantiora a Julio Caesare ad Postumus (Outstanding Imperial Coins from Caesar to Postumus), Giovanni Battista Bernabò & Giuseppe Lazzarini, Rome (1674, 1743).
- James L. Franklin, Jr., Pompeis Difficile Est: Studies in the Political Life of Imperial Pompeii, University of Michigan Press (2001).
- Michel Humm, Appius Claudius Caecus, La République accomplie, Rome, Publications de l'École française de Rome (2005).
- Robert A. Kaster, Cicero: Speech on Behalf of Publius Sestius, Clarendon Ancient History Series, Oxford University press (2006).
- MacBain, Alexander (1911). An Etymological Dictionary of the Gaelic Language. E. P. Dutton.
- Charles Peter Mason, "Claudia Gens", in Dictionary of Greek and Roman Biography and Mythology, William Smith, ed., Little, Brown and Company, Boston (1849), vol. I, p. 762; "Claudius" (patrician), in Dictionary of Greek and Roman Biography and Mythology, vol. I, pp. 765–775; "Claudius" (plebeian), in Dictionary of Greek and Roman Biography and Mythology, p. 775.
- A. H. McDonald, "The Censorship–Review of the Roman Censors", in Classical Review, vol. XV, No. 1, pp. 89–91 (1965).
- Antoine Meillet, Dictionnaire étymologique de la langue latine, histoire des mots, Klinsieck, Paris (1959).
- Inge Mennen, Power and Status in the Roman Empire, AD 193–284, Koninklijke Brill NV, Leiden (2011).
- Barthold Georg Niebuhr, The History of Rome, Julius Charles Hare and Connop Thirlwall, trans., John Smith, Cambridge (1828).
- Stephen P. Oakley, A Commentary on Livy, Books VI–X, Clarendon Press, Oxford (1997, 2005).
- August Pauly; Georg Wissowa; Wilhelm Kroll; Kurt Witte; Karl Mittelhaus; Konrat Ziegler, eds. (1894–1980). Paulys Realencyclopädie der classischen Altertumswissenschaft. Stuttgart: J. B. Metzler.
- Andrew Pettinger, The Republic in Danger: Drusus Libo and the Succession of Tiberius, Oxford University Press (2012).
- Karey Rodgirs, "Andrew Pettinger, The Republic in Danger" (book review), in Constellations, University of Alberta, vol. IV, No. 1 (January 2013).
- Päivi Setälä, Private Domini in Roman Brick Stamps of the Empire: A Historical and Prosopographical Study of Landowners in the District of Rome, Suomalainen Tiedeakatemia (1977).
- Robert K. Sherk, "The Text of the Senatus Consultum De Agro Pergameno", in Greek, Roman, and Byzantine Studies, vol. 7, pp. 361–369 (1966).
- C. J. Simpson, "The Early Name of the Emperor Claudius", in Acta Antiqua Academiae Scientiarum Hungaricae, volume 29, pages 363–368 (1981).
- D.P. Simpson, Cassell's Latin and English Dictionary, Macmillan Publishing Company, New York (1963).
- J. E. H. Spaul, "Governors of Tingitana", in Antiquités Africaines, vol. 30 (1994).
- Jaakko Suolahti, The Roman Censors: A Study of Social Structure, Suomalainen Tiedeakatemia, Helsinki (1963).
- Lily Ross Taylor, The Voting Districts of the Roman Republic, University of Michigan Press, Ann Arbor (1960).
- Susan Treggiari, Servilia and Her Family, Oxford University Press (2019).
