= Gaius Claudius Marcellus (consul 49 BC) =

Senator of the Roman Republic

Gaius Claudius Marcellus (before 91 BC – c. 48 BC) was a Consul of the Roman Republic in 49 BC.

== Family and political career ==
The Claudii Marcelli were a plebeian family, members of the nobiles with a long history of consulships throughout the history of the Republic. Following a century without the family reaching the consulship, three Claudii Marcelli were Consuls in succession: in 51 BC Marcus Claudius Marcellus (the brother of Gaius Marcellus); in 50 BC Gaius Claudius Marcellus Minor (their cousin); and in 49 BC Gaius Marcellus himself.

Gaius Marcellus was born sometime before 91 BC. His father was M. Claudius Marcellus, curule aedile of 91; his great-grandfather was M. Claudius Marcellus who was three times consul, and whose own grandfather – also a M. Claudius Marcellus – was five times consul and fought against Hannibal in Italy.

Nothing is known of his earlier life, any military service, or his quaestorship and entry to the Senate, although he may have been the candidate in opposition to Clodius for the curule aedileship of 56 BC of whom, on 23 November, Cicero wrote "The candidate Marcellus is snoring so loud that I can hear him next door" (although the other two contemporary Claudii Marcelli are also possibilities).

Marcellus must have held the praetorship at the latest in 52 BC, but he could have held the office some years before – there is no mention of this in the historical record.

In 50 BC Marcellus was elected consul for the following year alongside Lentulus Crus, as opponents to Caesar. Both his brother Marcus and cousin Gaius (Minor) had strongly opposed Caesar during their own consulships, working to have his proconsulship of Gaul terminated and to prevent Caesar from standing for election as consul of 48 BC in absentia. Caesar had blocked Marcus by working with the tribunes and the other consul, Servius Sulpicius Rufus, and then Gaius (Minor) by heavily bribing his consular colleague, Lucius Aemilius Paullus, but had not yet been able to secure election to a second consulship without having to stand as a candidate in Rome and without relinquishing his proconsular command (which would expose him to prosecution for illegalities in his first consulship). The election of Marcellus and Lentulus as consuls for 49 BC was within the normal framework of family connections and influences, but also a snub to Caesar through his own candidate, Servius Sulpicius Galba. Gaius Marcellus and Lentulus Crus continued the policy of the Claudii Marcelli in their opposition to Caesar.

== Civil War ==
Late in 50 BC, with much of the Senate wanting peace and unwilling to act against Caesar, the consul Gaius Marcellus (Minor) took matters into his own hands and led a coup, without the backing of the Senate and directed against Caesar, aiming to put control of an army into the hands of Pompeius. Lentulus, as consul-elect certainly joined with him in this, possibly Gaius Marcellus Major too. Neither the Claudii Marcelli or Lentulus were particular adherents of Pompeius, a powerful magnate and general, but saw him as a tool to use against Caesar.

On the Kalends 1 January 49 BC, Marcellus and Lentulus entered office, and were presented at once with letters from Caesar, the tenor of which was claimed to be a declaration of war: Caesar would stand his legions down provided Pompey did as well; otherwise, he intended to retain them and "move quickly" to avenge the wrongs done against him—presumably against Rome. The Senate's response was an ultimatum: Caesar was to disband his legions or be declared a public enemy. After a week of angry exchanges, on 7 January 49 BC, the senate under Lentulus and Marcellus passed the "final decree" (senatus consultum ultimum); the tribunes Antonius and Cassius fled with Caesar's envoy, the younger Gaius Scribonius Curio, from Rome to meet Caesar at Ravenna. Whilst Lentulus is recorded as the more vehement of the consuls in instigating the action that caused the tribunes to flee, Marcellus does not seem to have been aloof. On 10 January, Caesar famously crossed the Rubicon, starting the Civil War.

Initially Marcellus remained in Rome, with the consuls opposing any accommodation with Caesar, maintaining an anti-Caesarian hysteria, and pressuring Pompeius to cross Italy and raise troops. On 17 January both Marcellus and his colleague followed Pompeius in leaving Rome ahead of Caesar's advancing forces, scandalously without even making the usual sacrifices before departure.

They went south to Teanum where, on 22 January, Lucius Julius Caesar, a kinsman serving with Caesar, brought conciliatory proposals from the proconsul. On 25 January Cicero (whose letters provide the details of these events) met with Marcellus and Lentulus in Capua, along with many other senators who had fled Rome. Cicero reported to his correspondent, Atticus, that all were anxious that Caesar should stand by his offer and they had sent messages back to him. However, within a few days Cicero was reporting to Atticus that the consuls did not care for peace. Lentulus was even reported to have tried to recruit gladiators at one stage, but thought better of this when criticized.

The whereabouts of Marcellus was not known, even by 7 February, when he was two days late for a meeting with Lentulus and Cicero. The latter despaired, writing in frustration that the consuls were of no use and that no recruiting was being done. Pompeius himself wrote from Luceria on 17 February to Marcellus and Lentulus urging them to collect all the troops they could and join him at Brundisium. By 20 February the consuls had done so.

In late February Caesar sent his agent, Cornelius Balbus (the younger) on a secret mission to win over the consul Lentulus with the bribe of a lucrative province; there is no hint that he made any similar offers to Marcellus, which may be an indication of the latter's comparative honesty or, perhaps more likely, his comparative insignificance in Roman politics. Balbus was too late in any case: Pompeius had sent both consuls and their forces on ahead of him to Dyrrhachium and he followed with the remainder by 4 March, narrowly evading Caesar. Cicero condemned this, as it destroyed the negotiations for peace which he claimed to be mediating.

Very little is known specifically about Marcellus after crossing to Dyrrachium, though he is addressed by the Goddess Discordia in Petronius' Satyricon, urged to hold fast to the decree which commanded Caesar to resign his proconsulship, the senatus consultum of 7 January 49 BC.

Pompeius placed much emphasis on his fleets to prevent Caesar from crossing from Italy. One fleet, that from Rhodes, was jointly commanded by Marcellus in association with Gaius Coponius. Other than this, nothing is known of Marcellus' involvement in the Civil War. The command of the Rhodian fleet at Dyrrachium was later mentioned as being under the command of Quintus Coponius and was wrecked in a storm. It is speculated that Marcellus was a casualty of the war – at least, he was not alive a few years later when Cicero was writing or delivering his Philippics (March 43 BC). Marcellus is not mentioned further.

== Notes ==
Political offices
Preceded by L. Aemilius Paullus; G. Claudius Marcellus	Roman consul 49 BC; With: L. Cornelius Lentulus Crus	Succeeded by Julius Caesar; P. Servilius Vatia Isauricus
