= Pro Marcello =

Speech by Cicero

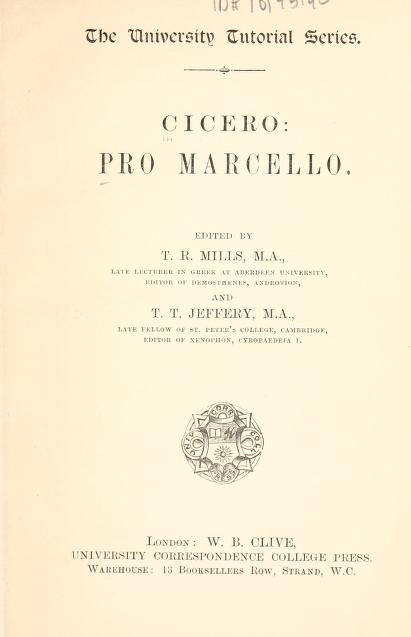
Title page of 1898 edition, edited by T. R. Mills and T. T. Jeffery.

Pro Marcello is a speech by Marcus Tullius Cicero. It is Latin for On behalf of Marcellus.

== Background ==
Marcus Claudius Marcellus was descended from an illustrious Roman family, and had been Consul with Servius Sulpicius Rufus, in which office he had given great offence to Caesar by making a motion in the Senate to deprive him of his command. In the Civil War, he supported Pompey, and had been present at the Battle of Pharsalia, after which he retired in exile to Lesbos. But, after some time, the Senate interceded with Caesar to pardon him, and allow him to return. When he yielded to their entreaties, Cicero made a speech, thanking Caesar for his magnanimity; though he had, as he says himself, determined to say nothing, he was afraid that if he continued his silence, Caesar would interpret it as proof that he despaired of the Republic.

Caesar, though he saw the Senate unanimous in their petition for Marcellus, yet had the motion for his pardon put to the vote, and called for the opinion of every individual senator on it. Cicero appears to have believed that Caesar intended to restore the Republic, as he mentions in his letters.
