= Lucius Cornelius Lentulus Crus =

Roman consul in 49 BC, enemy of Caesar

Lucius Cornelius Lentulus Crus (before 97 BC – 48 BC) was Consul of the Roman Republic in 49 BC, an opponent of Caesar and supporter of Pompeius in the Civil War during 49 to 48 BC.

== Family and political career ==
Born sometime before 97 BC, son of a Publius Lentulus, his origins are otherwise unknown, though he was most likely a member of the patrician Cornelii Lentuli branch of the gens Cornelia.

Details of Crus' younger years are not known. In 72 BC, Caesar's man Balbus acquired his Roman citizenship for service under Pompeius against Quintus Sertorius in Spain. On the basis of the Roman names he took – Lucius Cornelius Balbus – and on the basis of later letters to Cicero, it is possible that both Balbus major and minor obtained citizenship with the sponsorship of L. Cornelius Lentulus Crus, who may then have been serving with Pompeius as a legate (Pompeius was there 76 BC to 71 BC; had Crus been born c. 98 BC, he would have been between the ages of 22 and 27 at the time).

In 61 BC he was the chief prosecutor of Publius Clodius Pulcher at a quaestio extraordinaria over the latter's violation of the mysteries of the Bona Dea, along with two other Cornelii Lentuli, in which he failed to secure a conviction due in large part to the bribes which Clodius spread among the jurors.

Lentulus' rise through the cursus honorum of political office is not now known prior to his election, during the consulship of Caesar and Bibulus, as Praetor for 58 BC. During his term of office Clodius, now a tribune of the people, moved against his enemy Cicero on the basis that the latter, as consul of 63 BC, had put Roman citizens to death without trial. Cicero hoped for Lentulus' aid against Clodius; although the praetor did, with other senior figures, attempt to persuade Pompeius to act to protect Cicero, this failed, as Pompeius refused to act against an elected tribune on his own authority.

In 51 BC he stood for election to the prestigious priestly board of fifteen men in charge of the Sibylline Books (Quindecimviri sacris faciundis), but was defeated by Publius Cornelius Dolabella (to the amusement of Cicero's correspondent, Marcus Caelius Rufus).

In 50 BC he was elected consul for the following year alongside G. Claudius Marcellus, as opponents to Caesar, and was an active and vocal participant in the increasingly hysterical scenes in the senate in late 50 and January 49 as Caesar sought to secure a safe consulship while a reactionary group of senators sought to have him stripped of command. Finally, on 7 January 49 BC, the senate under Lentulus and Marcellus passed the "final decree" (senatus consultum ultimum); the tribunes Mark Antony and Quintus Cassius fled with Caesar's envoy, the younger Curio, from Rome to meet Caesar at Ravenna. On the 10th, Caesar famously crossed the Rubicon, starting the Civil War.

== Civil War ==
Initially Lentulus remained in Rome but left, with many senators, ahead of Caesar's advancing forces. He recruited troops for Pompeius in Capua (even gladiators at one stage, before thinking better of this). Caesar sent his agent, the younger Balbus, on a mission to win over Lentulus – possibly Crus was patronus to the Cornelii Balbi, uncle and nephew, if he had been their sponsor when they were granted Roman citizenship under Pompeius in 72, and Caesar hoped that Balbus would have some influence with the consul. However, by 3 March Cicero reported to Atticus that the Consuls had crossed over from Brundisium to the shore of Greece.

While proconsul of the Roman province of Asia, Lentulus recruited two legions for Pompeius - a decree of his in July 49 BC exempted the Jews of Asia Minor from military service. He fought alongside Pompeius at the Battle of Pharsalus on 9 August 48 BC, where he commanded the Pompeian left wing. On his flight from the battlefield Lentulus was denied refuge in Antioch and instead followed Pompeius to Egypt. He was taken prisoner on 4 September on the order of King Ptolemy XIII and executed while in prison.

Caesar himself placed a great deal of blame on Lentulus for the events of late 50/early 49 which brought about the civil war, commenting on the magnitude of Lentulus' debts and his hopes for control of an army and rich provinces, and going so far as to claim that the Consul was aiming to make himself master of Rome, a second Sulla. He was also seen as duplicitous, warning the senate in the debates of January 49 that if they did not declare against Caesar then he, Lentulus, had his own means of regaining Caesar's favour. Cicero, in a characteristically cutting remark, described Lentulus as being averse to the trouble of thinking. Writing of the private interests and personal ambitions of Pompeius' followers, he seems to give support to Caesar's claims, and his later acerbic comments that Lentulus promised himself Hortensius' town house, Caesar's suburban villa, and an estate at Baiae as spoils of the civil war do bear out Lentulus' reputation for avarice.

== Notes ==
Political offices
Preceded by L. Aemilius Paullus; G. Claudius G.f. Marcellus	Consul of Rome; 49 BC; With: Gaius Claudius M.f. Marcellus	Succeeded by Julius Caesar; P. Servilius Vatia Isauricus
