= Marcus Claudius Marcellus (aedile 91 BC) =

Politician and senator of the Roman Republic

Marcus Claudius Marcellus (late 2nd to mid 1st century BC) was a politician and senator of the Roman Republic. He belonged to the tribus Arnensis. He was the grandson of another Marcus Claudius Marcellus (cos. 166, 155 and 152 BC) and the father of two later consuls: Marcus Claudius Marcellus (cos. 51 BC), and Gaius Claudius Marcellus (cos. 49 BC). The Claudii Marcelli were a plebeian family, members of the nobiles with a long history of consulships throughout the history of the Republic.

Marcellus is mentioned by Cicero in his work, de Oratore (On the Orator) written in the mid-fifties, in a dialogue set in 91 BC, which identifies him as Curule Aedile of that year, celebrating the Roman games. There was no fixed age for holding the aedileship, but this was probably in his twenties.

He is probably the “M. Claudius M. f. Arnensis Marcellus” (Arnensis referencing his voting tribe) listed in the inscription of Oropos in Greece as a member of the consilium (Senate committee) which, in 73 BC, judged against the claims of Rome's publicani to collect taxes in Oropos. In MRR II and MRR III Broughton asserts that Marcellus held the Praetorship prior to 74 BC, probably many years before. Marcellus heads the list of senators given in the Oropos inscription, following the consuls, suggesting his seniority.

Marcellus was probably that M. Claudius Marcellus named in Cicero's published speech in Verrem as major patron in Sicily.

== Bibliography ==
=== Ancient works ===
- Cicero, de Natura Deorum, de Oratore (translation by William Guthrie on Wikisource), in Verrem (translation by C. D. Yonge on Wikisource)

=== Modern works ===
- Broughton, T. Robert S. (1952). The Magistrates of the Roman Republic, Vol. II (99 B.C.-31 B.C.). New York: American Philological Association.
- Broughton, T. Robert S. (1986). The Magistrates of the Roman Republic, Vol. III. Atlanta, Georgia: Scholars Press.
- Friedrich Münzer, Claudius 227, in Pauly-Wissowa. Pauly's Realencyclopädie der Classischen Altertumswissenschaft.
- Smith, William (1867). A Dictionary of Greek and Roman biography and mythology. Boston: Little, Brown and Co.
- Wilhelm Dittenberger, Sylloge Inscriptionum Graecarum (Collection of Greek Inscriptions, abbreviated SIG), Leipzig (1883).
