= Appius Claudius Julianus =

Appius Claudius Julianus was a Roman politician and statesman in the 3rd century AD.

== Biography ==
Julianus may have been descended from the Claudii Pulchri, whose roots go back to the time of the Republic. He was likely the son of Appius Claudius Martialis and Sextia Torquata, making him the brother of Appius Claudius Lateranus, suffect consul at the end of the 2nd century AD.

Between 200 and 210 AD, Julianus served as suffect consul. Then, under the emperor Caracalla or Elagabalus, he held the office of Proconsul of the Province of Africa. In 224 AD, Julianus served as ordinary consul, with Gaius Bruttius Crispinus as his colleague. In the following year, Julianus became Urban Prefect of Rome.

His son was the suffect consul of 238 AD, Claudius Julianus, mentioned in the Historia Augusta, and his daughter was Claudia Sabinilla.
