= Marcus Claudius Glicia =

Ancient Roman, short-lived Dictator

Marcus Claudius Glicia or Glycias was a subordinate of the consul Publius Claudius Pulcher who briefly served as dictator in 249 BC.

== Family ==
Glicia was a client of gens Claudia, an influential patrician family that had held the highest offices in the Roman state since the early 5th century BC. His father was named Gaius and had the nomen gentilicium of his patron, one of the Claudii. Extremely unusually, the fasti do not mention his grandfather's name.

The epitome of Livy mentions that he was sortis ultimae hominem ("a man of the lowest order"). Mark Wilson, in Dictator (2021), notes that Livy's words can be read two ways. If sors is read to mean "rank", he could have been a freedman, son of a freedman, or otherwise a member of the poor capite censi. But if sors is read to mean "kind", it could be reflection of Glicia's lack of character, with "Livy... suggesting [this inference] from his observation that subsequently Glicia shamelessly wore a purple stripe to games like any other ex-dictator". Suetonius renders Glicia's name as "Glycias", however, which could indicate that he was a freedman or the freeborn son thereof. However, the fasti's use of filius rather than libertus indicates that it is more likely that Glicia was freeborn.

== Dictatorship ==
=== Background ===
Glicia served as the consul Publius Claudius Pulcher's viator (messenger). The fasti records that Glicia had been a "scribe" – Glicia qui scriba fuerat – it is unclear whether the pluperfect form means he was a former scribe at his appointment or that he was a scribe immediately before his appointment.

The epitome of Livy's 19th book records that in 249 BC:

Claudius Pulcher, consul, obstinately persisting, notwithstanding the omens were inauspicious, engages the enemy's fleet, and is beaten; drowns the sacred chickens which would not feed: recalled by the senate, and ordered to nominate a dictator; he appoints Claudius Glicia, one of the lowest of the people, who, notwithstanding his being ordered to abdicate the office, yet attends the celebration of the public games in his dictator's robe.

The engagement mentioned was a naval engagement called the Battle of Drepana off the coast of Sicily during the First Punic War; Claudius' sacred chickens were used for auguries. "Unused to the pitching decks of a Roman trireme", they refused to eat: a bad omen. Pulcher infamously responding by ordering that they should be thrown into the sea with the phrase "If they will not eat, let them drink!". The tale was mentioned by the first century AD historian Valerius Maximus as an example of the need to take auguries seriously.

=== Appointment ===
Pulcher's impious actions were blamed for the subsequent defeat, in which the navally-unaccustomed Romans lost almost their entire fleet. Upon hearing of the result of the battle, the Senate recalled him to Rome, charged Pulcher with treason for his treatment of the chickens, and ordered him to appoint a dictator to resume operations in his place.

In response to the senatorial request for a dictator and "apparently out of spite" and in jest, Pulcher nominated as dictator "the most inappropriate man he could think of": Glicia. The dictator's tenure was extremely short-lived; the senate induced him – via unknown means – to resign immediately. It is possible that he resigned the dictatorship before formally taking office by passage of a lex curiata that would have granted him imperium.

No magister equitum is recorded for his dictatorship. The more suitable Aulus Atilius Calatinus was appointed in his stead and became the first dictator to lead a Roman army outside of Italy. After laying down the office, Glicia furthered the controversy by attending the Roman games wearing a purple-bordered toga, a symbol of the dictatorship and something that he was not considered entitled to.

== Legacy ==
Glicia's appointment was picked up by Suetonius to show the dishonourable side of the patrician Claudian family's history, down to the emperor Tiberius. Similarly – it appears for literary effect – Livy also endowed the Claudians of the republican period in his history with an overbearing and contemptuous arrogance, of which Pulcher's joke appointment was supposed to be an example; his characterisation may indicate an uncomfortableness between the historian and the Julio-Claudian imperial family of his time. Wilson also suggests that after Glicia's appointment, an understanding emerged that any person nominated to the dictatorship should be a former consul.
