= Gaius Claudius Marcellus (consul 50 BC) =

Roman politician

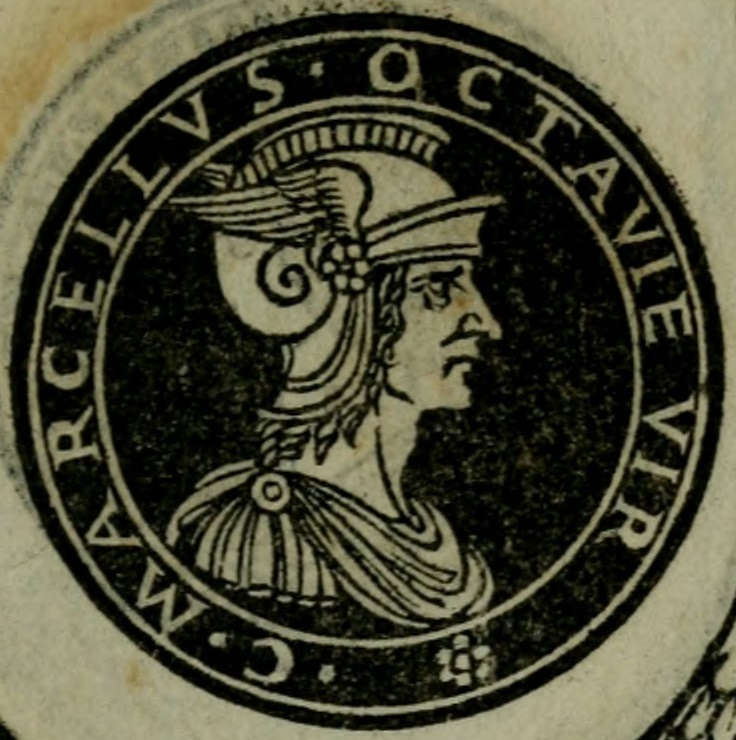
- "C. Marcellus, Octavia's husband" from Illvstrivm (1517)
- Born: 88 BC
- Died: May 40 BC
- Office: Consul (50 BC)
- Spouse(s): Wife (name unknown); Octavia the Younger
- Children: Claudia Marcella (wife of Sextus Quinctilius Varus); Marcus Claudius Marcellus; Claudia Marcella the Elder; Claudia Marcella the Younger
- Parent(s): Gaius Claudius Marcellus and Junia

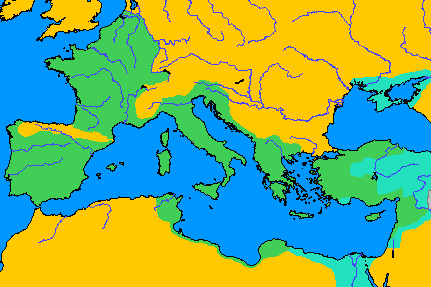
Roman Republic in 50 BC

Gaius Claudius Marcellus (88 BC – May 40 BC) was a Roman senator who served as Consul in 50 BC. He was a friend to Roman senator Cicero and an early opponent of Julius Caesar.

He was also noteworthy for marrying the sister of the future emperor Augustus, Octavia the Younger, with whom he fathered M. Marcellus, who was for a while Augustus' intended heir.

== Biography ==
=== Early life ===
He was a direct descendant of consul Marcus Claudius Marcellus. His grandfather was also named Marcus; his father was Gaius and his mother was named Junia.

=== Family ===
By 54 BC Marcellus had married Octavia the Younger, a great-niece of Julius Caesar (and sister of future emperor Augustus), in an arranged ceremony. Octavia bore Marcellus three known surviving children: a son, Marcus, and two daughters, Claudia Marcella Major and Claudia Marcella Minor, born in Rome. However, according to the anonymous Περὶ τοῦ καισαρείου γένους Octavia bore Marcellus four sons and four daughters.

Because of Marcellus relatively advanced age at the time of his marriage to Octavia, it has been suspected by Ronald Syme that he might have been married before to a woman who is not attested. Christian Settipani has speculated that Marcellus might have had a daughter by an earlier wife who married the Roman senator Sextus Quinctilius Varus (who served as a Quaestor in 49 BC). This Claudia Marcella would then have become mother of Publius Quinctilius Varus and his three sisters.

=== Opposition to Julius Caesar ===
In 54 BC the great-uncle of Octavia, Julius Caesar, was said to be anxious for her to divorce Marcellus so that she could marry Pompey, his rival and son-in-law who had just lost his wife Julia (daughter of Caesar and thus Octavia's cousin once removed). However, Pompey apparently declined the proposal and Octavia's husband continued to oppose Julius Caesar, culminating in the crucial year of his consulship in 50 BC when he tried to recall Julius Caesar from his ten-year governorship in Gaul two years early, without his army, in an attempt to save the Roman Republic. Failing this, he called unsuccessfully upon Caesar to resign.

He also obstructed Caesar from standing for a second consulship in absentia, insisting that he should return to Rome to stand, thereby forgoing the protection of his armies in Gaul. When Caesar finally invaded Italy in 49 BC, Marcellus, unlike his brother and nephew, did not take up arms against him. Caesar subsequently pardoned him.

=== Later years ===
In 46 BC, with the help of other senators including Cicero (in the latter's Pro Marcello), Gaius was able to intercede with Caesar for his cousin M. Claudius Marcellus, a former consul of 51 BC and a fervent anti-Caesarian, who was at the time living in exile in Mytilene. Gaius died in May 40 BC; five months later, his widow, Octavia, married the triumvir Mark Antony.

Political offices
Preceded by Ser. Sulpicius Rufus; M. Claudius Marcellus	Consul of the Roman Republic; 50 BC; With: L. Aemilius Paullus	Succeeded by G. Claudius Marcellus; L. Cornelius Lentulus Crus
