= Lucius Aemilius Paullus (consul 50 BC) =

Roman politician and consul in 50 BC

Denarius
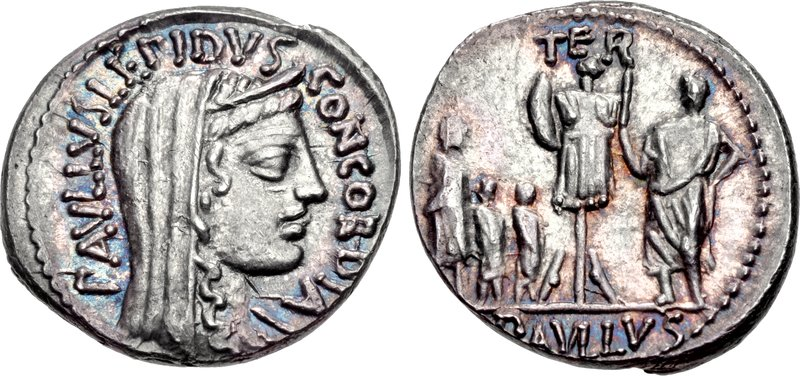
First side of the image: Left: PAVLLVS•LEPIDVS; right: CONCORDIA; Veiled and diademed head of Concordia right.

Moneyer mark clockwise.

Border of dots.
Second side of the image: Togate figure of Lucius Aemilius Paullus standing left, touching trophy; to left standing right as captives, the King Perseus of Macedon and his two sons.

Moneyer mark above and in exergue.

Border of dots.; On top: TER, in esergue: PAVLLVS
AR; 18mm; 3,89 g

Lucius Aemilius Paullus (fl. 1st century BC) was a Roman politician. He was the brother of triumvir Marcus Aemilius Lepidus and son to Marcus Aemilius Lepidus the consul of 78 BC. His mother may have been a daughter of Lucius Appuleius Saturninus.

Paullus supported Cicero during the Catiline Conspiracy. He never supported Pompey, probably because he held a grudge against him for betraying his father in 77 BC. Paullus was quaestor in 59 BC, aedile in 55, praetor in 53 and consul in 50.

During Paullus' consulship, Julius Caesar bribed him for his support. He reconstructed the Basilica Aemilia in Rome, with part of his bribery money.

According to Valerius Maximus: "When the senate decreed that the temples of Isis and Serapis be demolished and none of the workmen dared touch them, consul Lucius Aemilius Paullus took off his official gown, seized an axe, and dashed it against the doors of that temple", (I, 3.3; quoting Julius Paris (translation from Loeb edition).

Paullus opposed the second triumvirate of Octavian, Mark Antony and Paullus' own brother, Marcus Lepidus. He supported Cicero in condemning its members. The triumvirs included him in their proscriptions. However, according to Cassius Dio, his brother allowed him to escape. Lepidus' soldiers left him unhindered. Paullus joined the political rebel Marcus Junius Brutus. When Brutus died in 42, Paullus was pardoned and lived his remaining years at Miletus.

Paullus' son, Paullus Aemilius Lepidus, was consul in 34 BC, and in 22 he shared the office of censor with Augustus.

Political offices
Preceded by Servius Sulpicius Rufus; M. Claudius Marcellus	Roman consul 50 BC; With: G. Claudius G. f. Marcellus	Succeeded by G. Claudius M. f. Marcellus; L. Cornelius Lentulus Crus
