= Postumia (wife of Servius Sulpicius Rufus) =

Roman woman of the late Republic

- Born: Rome
- Died: Rome
- Spouse: Servius Sulpicius Rufus
- Children: Servius Sulpicius Rufus

Postumia was an ancient Roman woman of the late Roman Republic, she was the wife of Roman lawyer Servius Sulpicius Rufus and a mistress of Julius Caesar.

== Biography ==
=== Early life ===
She was likely born around 100 BC to a Patrician family. It has been conjectured among some historians, among them Ronald Syme, that she was likely a sister of Aulus Postumius Albinus and the Postumia who was the mother of Decimus Junius Brutus Albinus.

=== Marriage ===
She married Servius Sulpicius Rufus, a famous lawyer. The couple had a son named Servius Sulpicius Rufus together (who would be the father of Sulpicia). Cicero early on identified her as a faithful wife and speaks of her with politeness in some of his letters. None-the less she was identified by Suetonius as one of Caesar's many mistresses. Cicero possibly makes an innuendo towards the affair in one of his letters. Historians Tyrrell and Purser have proposed that Postumia may have been the one who encouraged her son to join in Caesar's army during the Civil War, when his father sides with Pompey. In 49 BC she accompanied her son to a conference with Cicero about her husband's political future.

== Catullus's poem ==
Postumia has been identified as likely being the Postumia satirized in Catullus 27th poem, where she is portrayed as a drunken hostess of a party. It's possible that Catullus lambasted her as a way to get at her male relatives, or because he knew she was one of Caesar's lovers.

== Cultural depictions ==
Postumia appears as a frequent character in Robert Harris Cicero trilogy of novels. Her marriage to Rufus and affair with Caesar are featured in the novels to varying extents. She also appears in the Masters of Rome series by Colleen McCullough, in the book Caesar's Women she is brought up as a potential marriage candidate by Caesar, but his mother and other female relatives dismiss her, stating that she is a drunkard and her family is not prominent enough for him to marry into.

== See also ==
- Women in ancient Rome
