= Tiberius (praenomen) =

Latin personal name

Tiberius (/taɪˈbɪəriəs/ ty-BEER-ee-əs, Latin: [tɪˈbɛɾɪ.ʊs]), feminine Tiberia, is a Latin praenomen, or personal name, which was used throughout Roman history. Although not especially common, it was used by both patrician and plebeian families. The name is usually abbreviated Ti., but occasionally Tib.

For most of Roman history, Tiberius was about the twelfth or thirteenth most common praenomen. It was not used by most families, but was favored by several, including the gentes Aemilii, Claudii, and Sempronii. It was probably more widespread amongst the plebeians, and it became more common in imperial times. The name survived the collapse of Roman civil institutions in the 5th and 6th centuries, and continued to be used into modern times.

== Origin and meaning of the name ==
The origin of Tiberius was obscure even in Roman times, although popular etymology sometimes connected it with the ancient city of Tibur. It was also associated with the sacred river, the Tiberis, on the border of Latium and Etruria. A legend recorded by Livy was that the river, originally known as the Albula in Latin and the Rumon in Etruscan, came to be called Tiberis (Latin) or Thebris (Etruscan) after Tiberinus, the king of Alba Longa, was drowned in its waters. Tiberinus was afterward regarded as the god of the river. Children named Tiberius may have been named after the river and its patron god. Chase suggested that the same root may have connected the city of Tibur, the Umbrian town of Tifernum, and the mountain and river in Samnium known as Tifernus.

The Etruscan cognate of Tiberius is Thefarie, and an alternative interpretation of the name's origin is that the Latin praenomen was borrowed from Etruscan, or from the Etruscan name of the river. However, if the river was known in Latium by its present name at the time the praenomen was established, then Tiberius would still be regarded as Latin, even if the river's name were based on an Etruscan root instead of a Latin one. In any case, Tiberius was used by families of Latin, Etruscan, and Oscan origin, and was thus already distributed throughout Italy at the earliest times.

== See also ==
- Roman naming conventions
