= Roman dictator =

Extraordinary magistrate of the Roman Republic

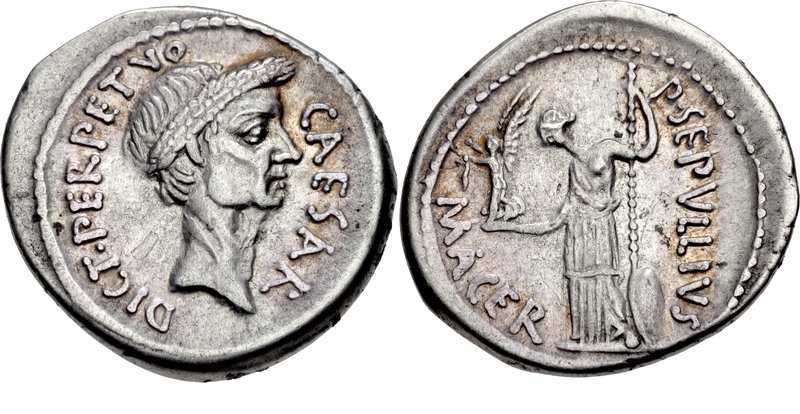
Denarius of Publius Sepullius Macer, 44 BC, with the head of Julius Caesar on the obverse. The legend mentions that Caesar was dictator perpetuo.

A Roman dictator was an extraordinary magistrate of the Roman Republic, endowed with full authority to resolve some specific problem to which he had been assigned. He received the full powers of the state, subordinating the other magistrates, consuls included, for the specific purpose of resolving that issue, and only that issue, and then dispensing with those powers immediately.

A dictator was still controlled and accountable during his term of office: the Senate still exercised some oversight authority, and the rights of plebeian tribunes to veto his actions or of the people to appeal them were retained. The extent of a dictator's mandate strictly controlled the ends to which his powers could be directed. Dictators were also—at least in some cases—liable to prosecution after their terms completed.

Dictators were frequently appointed from the earliest period of the Republic down to the Second Punic War (218–201 BC), but the magistracy then went into abeyance for over a century. It was later revived in a significantly modified form, first by Sulla between 82 and 79 BC and then by Caesar between 49 and 44 BC, who became dictator perpetuo just before his death. This later dictatorship was used to effect wide-ranging and semi-permanent changes across Roman society. After Caesar's assassination in 44 BC, the office was formally abolished and never revived.

== Traditional dictatorship ==
The reasons for which someone might be appointed dictator were varied. The purpose of the dictatorship was to return Rome to the status quo before some threat emerged. The dictatorship existed "to eliminate whatever had arisen that was out of bounds and then eliminate themselves so that normal operation of the ordinary government" could resume.

=== Origin ===
The abolition of the Roman monarchy c. 509 BC, according to tradition, devolved the royal powers onto two annually elected consuls. The creation of the dictatorship is part of this tradition, which is somewhat confused. Its original title was magister populi, "master of the infantry". (Note: Literally, of the "people", referring to the common soldiers, as opposed to the cavalry.) His lieutenant was the magister equitum, "master of the horse". (Note: Literally, of the equites, sometimes translated as "knights".) The dictator may have also been called the praetor maximus, as mentioned by Livy, referring to an old law requiring the praetor maximus to put a nail into the wall of a temple on the ides of September.

It is not certain who the first dictator was or in what year he was appointed. Livy gives two versions: in one, the first dictator was Titus Larcius in 501 BC. His other version states that the first dictator was Manius Valerius Maximus, although Livy thought this improbable, as he had not previously been consul and, had a Valerius been desired, Manius' father, Marcus, who was consul in 505 BC, could have been chosen instead. However, few modern scholars put much faith in these traditional accounts: by the time Roman history started being written down, the dictatorship as a military command had already lapsed out of living memory.

The dictatorship seems to have been conceived as a way to bypass normal Roman politics and create a short-term magistrate with special powers, serving to defend the Republic in war, or otherwise to cow internal civil unrest, especially if such unrest imperilled the conduct of war. There are broadly two views on the dictatorship's origin: that it descends from the Latins, or that it was a uniquely Roman institution.

The Roman view stresses that the dictatorship is said to have existed from the earliest years of the Republic, created as "an integral part of the republican constitution". And while other Latin cities had dictatorships, they emerged from their abolished monarchies as ordinary magistrates rather than as an extraordinary magistrate only appointed in time of crisis. Others have argued that the dictatorship existed as a means to slip through the inefficiency of a new collegiate magistracy, arguing that the Romans would not have made it—with regal powers—an integral part of their constitution in the immediate aftermath of the monarchy's abolition, confining it therefore to a peripheral and extraordinary role. Other scholars have advanced theories that the consuls came after the dictatorship rather than before.

The Latin view argues that the dictatorship emerged from the need to rotate command between Latin states in the role of commanding the Latin League's united armies. While Rome was not a formal member of the League, it did require the Latins to serve in Rome's wars under a Roman commander, which could have been a dictator appointed for the occasion. One argument of this is the siege of Veii: for nine years of siege, Rome did not resort to a dictator, until the last year when Etruscan intervention compelled Rome to call in its Latin allies. Moreover, it is plausible that the dictatorship was borrowed from other Latin municipalities that had a dictator serving as a military commander. This view also stresses continuity between the Roman kingdom and the succeeding republic, with the dictatorship as a bridge between the two periods.

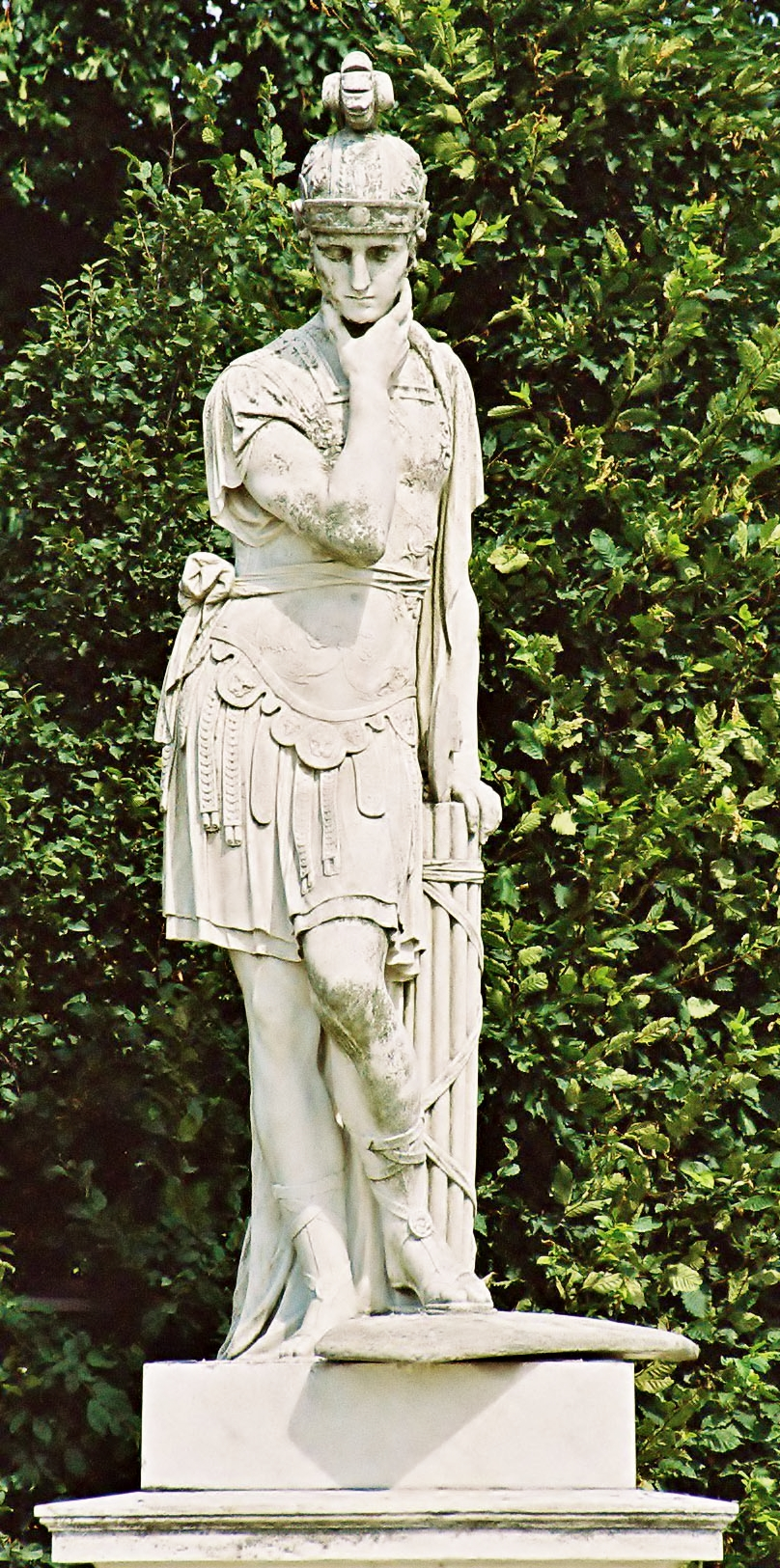
Depiction of Quintus Fabius Maximus Verrucosus. Fabius was dictator in 217 BC.

=== Nomination ===
The dictator was the only important official in the Roman state that was appointed. (Note: "Every other [ie not the dictator] important official in the Roman state was elected... the interrex was elected by, and from among, the patrician senators; the princeps senatus was originally elected by the curiae ... the pontifices and flamens were elected. Dictators, however, were appointed by the sole discretion of one consul".) The power to appoint a dictator normally vested in the consuls, one of whom could nominate a man to serve in the office; he did not need to consult his colleague, and no other magistrates had such authority. A dictator could also be created by comitial legislation at the proposal of other magistrates, as was the case with Sulla and Caesar.

Consular nomination occurred in a nocturnal ritual, usually preceded by advice from the Senate asking for a specific person to be appointed, (Note: There is indication that the consuls could appoint anyone they wished. For example, after being defeated in a naval battle, Publius Claudius Pulcher was told to nominate a dictator; he nominated a lowborn subordinate of his, Marcus Claudius Glicia, who resigned in the ensuing outrage.) but this was not strictly necessary. A vote of the people could be held, but this was unusual, perhaps except in cases with a non-consular nominator. In the case of Quintus Fabius Maximus Verrucosus, the people may have created him dictator directly by legislation. After c. 300 BC most attested dictators were ex-consuls; but it does not appear that this emerged from any kind of legislation, as implied in Livy.

Dictatorial powers likely extended beyond the term of the nominating magistrate, but most dictators are recorded to have given up their powers as quickly as possible. Customary law required dictators to give up their powers immediately after completion of their assigned task.

A dictator could be nominated for different reasons, or causae. These causae were akin to provinciae, spheres of command assigned to a magistrate which bound their freedom of action. The various causae were:

- rei gerundae causa, "for the conduct of the matter", used for military emergencies,
- comitiorum habendorum causa, for holding the comitia, or elections, when the consuls were unable to do so;
- clavi figendi causa, to create a dictator for an important religious rite involving the driving of a nail into the wall of the Temple of Jupiter Optimus Maximus, as a protection against pestilence;
- for quelling of sedition;
- for establishing a religious holiday;
- for holding the Roman games, an ancient religious festival;
- for investigating certain actions; and,
- in one extraordinary case, for appointment of senators, after the Battle of Cannae.

These reasons could be combined (e.g., seditionis sedandae et rei gerundae causa, for quelling sedition and for war). However, by the middle Republic the historical record clearly shows that dictators were appointed more as temporary extraordinary magistrates to do some very specifically defined action before resigning, acting as proxies or substitutes for the ordinary magistrates of that year; the historicity of the dictators appointed in the early period to quell sedition—who usually took the side of the protestors—is also debated.

The Romans were not consistent in classifying specific threats and then appointing a dictator if they met some criteria. Rather, they judged the matter subjectively such that a dictator in military matters would only be appointed if there were converging threats from multiple enemies, all-consuming ongoing wars, or extinction-level threats to the city which could be handled by a man "whose empowerment with the dictatorship offered more assurance of success than the incumbent magistrates". Alternatively, dictators might be appointed if another consul-like magistrate was needed.

Normally there was only one dictator at a time, although a new dictator could be appointed following the resignation of another. (Note: The chief exception occurred in 216 BC, when Marcus Fabius Buteo was nominated dictator in order to fill up the ranks of the Senate following the Battle of Cannae, even as the dictator Marcus Junius Pera held the military command against Hannibal.) A dictator could be compelled to resign his office without accomplishing his task or serving out his term if there were found to be a fault in the auspices under which he had been nominated. After nomination, a dictator would have his imperium ratified by comitia curiata—bringing that matter before the Assembly himself—in a manner akin to that of the consuls.

=== Insignia ===
Like other curule magistrates, the dictator was entitled to the toga praetexta and the sella curulis. The dictator was accompanied by twenty-four lictors rather than the normal twelve lictors of the consul; but within the pomerium, he may have used only twelve. In a notable exception to the Roman reluctance to reconstitute the symbols of the kings, the lictors of the dictator never removed the axes from their fasces, even within the pomerium, symbolising their power over life and death and setting the dictator apart from the ordinary magistrates. In an extraordinary sign of deference, the lictors of other magistrates could not bear fasces at all when appearing before the dictator. The Latin theory of the dictatorship's origin has also suggested that the twenty-four lictors emerged from the uniting of "two governments". It may have also simply signalled that a dictator's imperium was superior to that of the consuls or that he was endowed with the power of both consuls. As the kings had been accustomed to appear on horseback, this right was forbidden to the dictator unless he first received permission from the comitia.

=== Powers and limitations ===
The full extent of the dictatorial power was considerable, but not unlimited. It was circumscribed by the conditions of a dictator's appointment, as well as by the evolving traditions of Roman law, and to a considerable degree depended on the dictator's ability to work together with other magistrates. The precise limitations of this power were not sharply defined, but subject to debate, contention, and speculation throughout Roman history.

In the pursuit of his causa, the dictator's authority was nearly absolute; however, as a rule he could not exceed the mandate for which he was appointed; a dictator nominated to hold the comitia could not then take up a military command against the wishes of the Senate. (Note: For instance, Lucius Manlius Capitolinus was appointed clavi figendi causa in 363 BC, but wished to lead an army against the Hernici. He proceeded to levy troops, but was compelled to resign before he could take the field, and was prosecuted the following year.) (Note: A dictator could also be appointed for a reason other than the one publicly announced; for example, Gaius Julius Iulus was nominated in 352 BC in order to carry on a war but was actually appointed to procure the election of two patrician consuls, in violation of the lex Licinia Sextia.) Dictators could carry out functions which fell outside the scope of their initial appointments, but only at the direction of the Senate; this included the drawing of funds from the public treasury, which a dictator could only do with the Senate's authorisation.

The imperium of the other magistrates was not vacated by the nomination of a dictator. They continued to perform the duties of their office, although subject to the dictator's authority, and continued in office until the expiration of their year, by which time the dictator had typically resigned. Dictatorial power also did not override that of the tribunes. While some sources assert there was no appeal to the tribunes from a dictator's actions, other sources document the extent of a dictator's powers within the pomerium, appeals against dictatorial action, and threats by tribunes to veto elections held by dictators.

Most authorities hold that a dictator could not be held to account for his actions after resigning his office; however, there are cases where the contrary is asserted in the literary sources, and the surviving text of the lex repetundarium implies the dictator and his magister equitum could be prosecuted after their terms ended. Rather, some modern scholars hold the position that unaccountability is a "legalistic illusion". Some sources, both ancient and modern in summaries of the office, assert that the dictator was limited to a term for six months, but this is contradicted by recorded practice and Livy has a dictator object to a six-month limitation explicitly as objectionably unorthodox.

=== Decline and disappearance ===
Before the First Punic War starting in 264 BC, when Rome established hegemony over Italy, dictators were overwhelmingly appointed to conduct military campaigns and also appointed regularly. However, these dictators were not given the best commands—they rarely won triumphs: only five of some seventy-five triumphs between 363 and 264 BC—suggesting that they functioned as substitutes for the ordinary magistrates. The middle Republic also shows significant use of the dictatorship to hold elections in place of consuls: this occurred twelve times during the First Punic War and eight times during the following Second. Magistri equitum had a knack of winning elections when held by dictators, which may explain why this limited dictatorship also fell into abeyance.

In domestic affairs, the dictators were at times—according to tradition—appointed to resolve issue between the patricians and the plebeians during the so-called Conflict of the Orders. In this role, the dictators always took the side of the plebs, implying that the later tradition of the dictatorship as a tool of patrician tyranny is a post-Sullan anachronism. Their efforts may have been decisive in that legislation passed in the Assemblies called by dictators did not need the approval of the Senate, serving to break impasses between an obstinate patrician-heavy Senate and popular demands.

After the Second Punic War and the Third Macedonian War, all major wars were then conducted by promagistrates and usually lasted several years, making the short term of the dictatorship unsuitable. Moreover, the fact that these conflicts occurred far from Rome radically limited the possibility of panicked tumult that could result in a dictatorial appointment. The rise of prorogation also meant that the Romans had, by jettisoning the annual term, more generals in the field than they had in the past. These promagistrates resembled archaic dictators as well, being exempt from normal consular responsibilities while being assigned a limited task—provincia—to complete.

At the same time, the new promagistrates also meant the consuls could spend more time at Rome, meaning it became less necessary to appoint dictators to conduct elections. During the various wars of the 140s BC, the ability to have more commanders under praetorian or proconsular leadership meant it was possible to keep at least one consul in Rome while the other fought abroad. Even when the Senate wanted to act against men such as Tiberius Gracchus or Gaius Gracchus, dictators were not appointed: in the former, the consul refused to act, precluding a dictatorial nomination, and in the latter, the Senate authorised the consul to use force via the so-called senatus consultum ultimum.

The religious purpose of the dictatorship in undertaking rituals to appease the gods in cases of pestilence or other disasters also was replaced. Dictators appointed to appease the gods was highly reactive but, over time, the accumulation of precedent formalised a spiritual process. Instead of an ad hoc approach, the Senate would advise—in moments of need—consultation of the Sibylline Books and direct implementation of the Books' recommendations.

== Late republican dictatorship ==
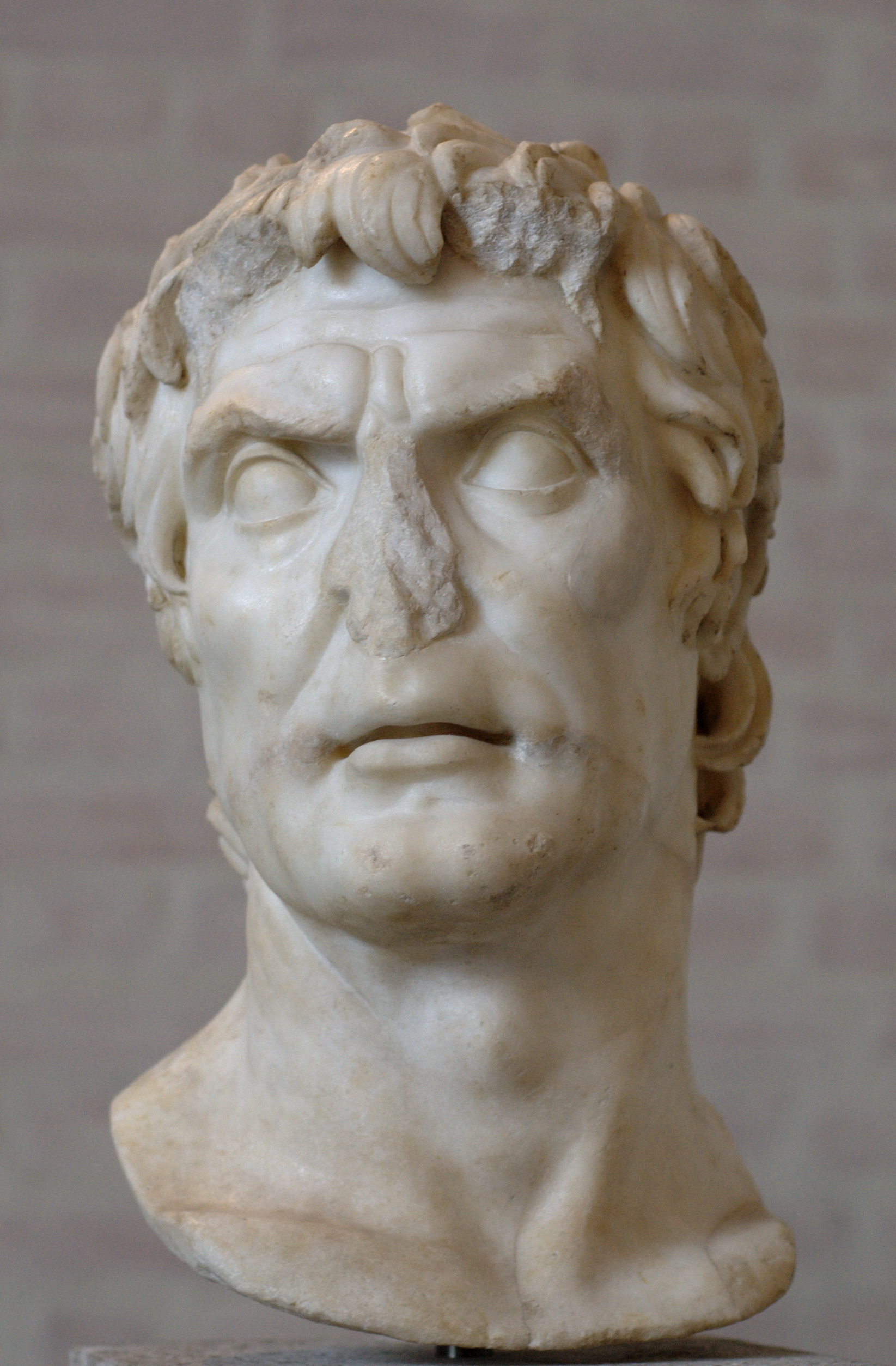
Head presumed to be that of Lucius Cornelius Sulla. Sulla was dictator from 82 to 79 BC.

The new dictatorships of Sulla and Caesar differed greatly from the traditional dictatorship. The long period of abeyance in which the dictatorship had lain meant that men like Sulla and Caesar were no longer bound by the chains of centuries of tradition requiring any man appointed to the dictatorship—traditionally a man trusted by all Romans—to act for all Romans, resolve the issue to which he was appointed, and then immediately resign.

=== Sulla ===
Following Sulla's civil war, Lucius Cornelius Sulla had the dictatorship revived. In 82 BC, with the consuls absent from the city, he induced the comitia centuriata, called by Lucius Valerius Flaccus as interrex, to pass a law appointing Sulla as dictator to write laws and reconstitute the state (Latin: legibus scribundis et rei publicae constituendae); he was also given immunity for all actions, both past and future.

After significant changes to the laws and proscriptions, he completed this task on 1 January 79 BC and resigned to take up an ordinary consulship. This dictatorship aligned with one aspect of the archaic dictatorship—restoring stability—as the state was in a shambles after the domination and proscriptions of Lucius Cornelius Cinna, Gaius Marius, and Gnaeus Papirius Carbo. "Sulla never aimed at permanent tyranny". Wishing his settlement to succeed, and conceiving of it in quasi-republican terms, he resigned the dictatorship in place of ordinary magistrates. Sulla's reforms and proscriptions stabilized a republic—albeit on radically reformed grounds, with Sulla as a "law-giver" who gave Rome "a new constitution that would put an end to political and social strife"—and restored somewhat free elections for the next few decades, at an enormous cost. The precedent that he set by twice marching on Rome with his armies would prove an equally destabilizing influence.

=== Between Sulla and Caesar ===
After Sulla's dictatorship, there are a few cases where a dictatorship was supposedly considered as a means of effecting regime change. One version of the supposed first Catilinarian conspiracy c. 65 BC (generally considered fictitious by modern scholarship) related by Suetonius would have involved the creation of a dictatorship led by Marcus Licinius Crassus with Caesar as magister equitum. Suetonius' version of events may be anachronistic, with Crassus and Caesar's involvement being an embellishment. Regardless, the suggestion of a dictatorship "belongs, perhaps to a late-republican school of thought that saw the antiquated office of the consulship as an ineffective path to the mastery of Rome" with the dictatorship as an "obvious tool for republican regime change" informed by Sulla's proscriptions and reforms. The phraseology of how Crassus would supposedly have been elevated to the dictatorship also suggests it was seen as an available instrument for ambitious factional leaders to force through self-serving change.

The later consulship of Pompey in 52 BC also is reported to have been initially intended as a dictatorship; but it was aborted by his election as sole consul—without a colleague—to restore order. Scholars disagree as to the reasons why Pompey was made sole consul: ancient sources (Appian, Dio, and Plutarch) all believed this occurred to deny him a dictatorship; "recent scholarship has emphasised Pompey's consulship rather as a means of resolving a political impasse". (Note: Specifically, Pompey was made sole consul by means of election from the comitia, contra certain ancient accounts, to prevent Milo from becoming consul and acquiring immunity from prosecution.) If this were an abortive dictatorship, it would have been "a final echo of the archaic dictators" with the sole goal of restoring order to the city.

=== Caesar ===
Caesar also revived the dictatorship during the Civil War, first to hold the elections—in which he was returned as consul for the following year—and on multiple occasions between October 48 BC and his death in 44. It is unclear which of Caesar's acts were undertaken under his overlapping dictatorial, proconsular, consular, or private authority. Unlike the consulship, which was limited by hundreds of years of precedent, the dictatorship, by virtue of its "separat[ion] from its foundations by 120 years of disuse", as well as Sulla's example, offered Caesar a position that gave him vast, ill-defined, and largely unconstrained powers. His dictatorship built on that of Sulla's as well: he changed the number of magistracies and reformed the state, but Caesar's dictatorship was administrative rather than one given up at the completion of a task. To that end, shortly before his death Caesar had himself appointed dictator perpetuo, i.e., in a dictatorship that continued each year without the need to seek the senate's approval or appointment by one of the consuls. This new and transformed dictatorship, endowed with a kingly power, ended with Caesar's assassination.

== Abolition ==
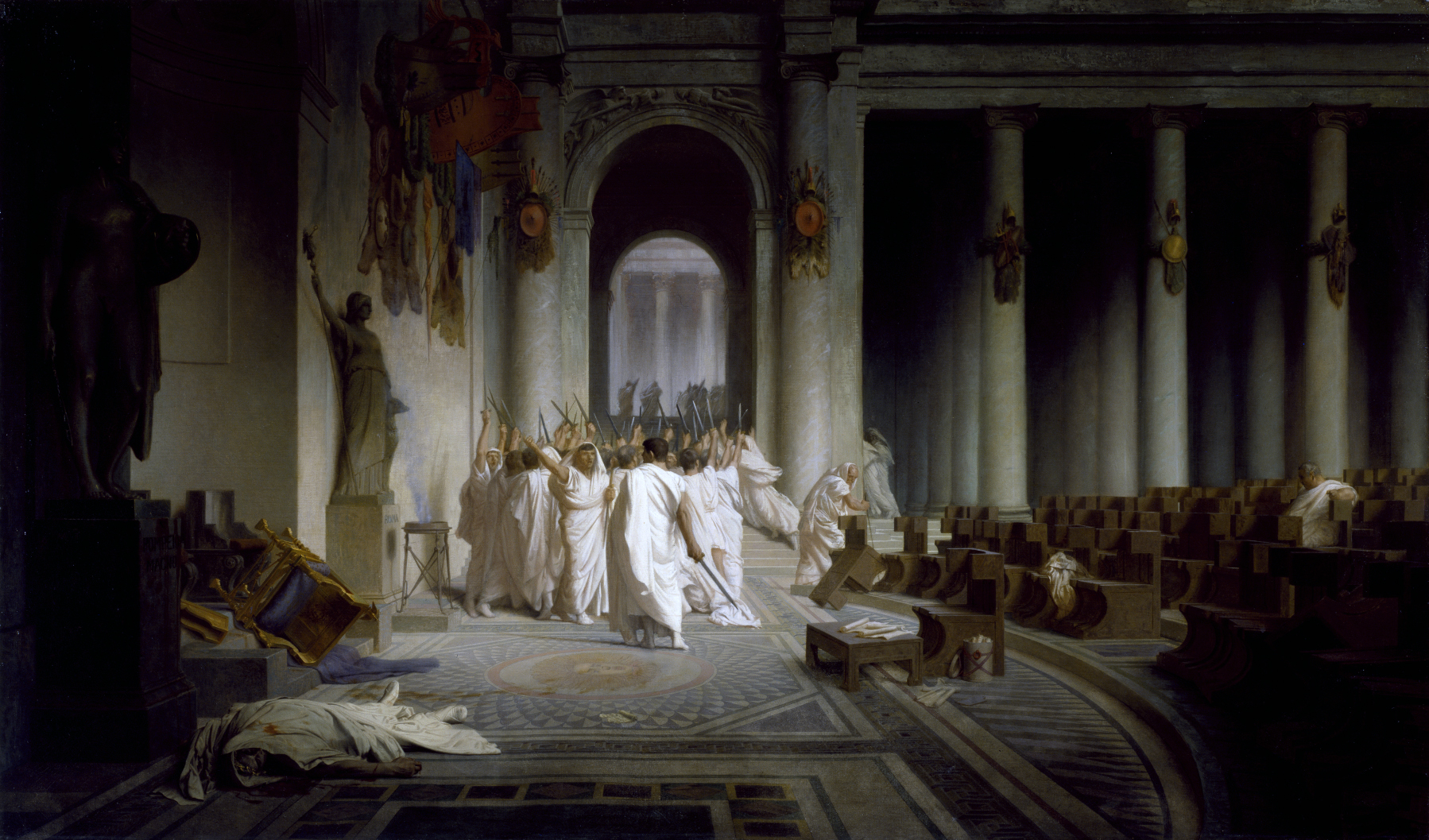
Depiction of the assassination of Julius Caesar in 44 BC, by Jean-Léon Gérôme (mid 19th century)

After Caesar's death, it became unlawful to propose, vote for, or accept any dictatorship. Any person who became dictator also could be summarily executed. Essentially, the title was cursed and excised from the republican constitution. Curiously, the person who did this was not one of the liberatores but rather, Caesar's own former magister equitum, Mark Antony. Antony's supporters lionised him for having rid the Republic of this instrument of tyranny.

The need for the dictatorship—especially as an instrument of pseudo-royal power—was clearly already gone: in 22 BC, a senatorial delegation begged Augustus to accept the dictatorship, and Augustus refused, knowing that the title would bring only hatred, and that his own informal authority, "encumbered by neither ancient nor recent precedent", would be sufficient.

== Magister equitum ==
The dictator's lieutenant was the magister equitum, or "master of the horse". The first act of a dictator was to choose this lieutenant, usually at his own discretion. It was customary for the dictator to nominate a magister equitum, even if he were appointed for a non-military reason. The magister equitum was also a curule magistrate, with powers to summon the Senate and perhaps also powers to summon assemblies. He had only six lictors, symbolizing his subordination to the dictator, and his expectation of quickly vacating office. The magister equitum was necessarily subordinate to the dictator, although this did not always prevent the two from disagreeing.

In theory, the magister equitum was commander of the cavalry, but he was not limited to that role. The dictator and magister equitum did not always take the field together; in some instances the magister equitum was assigned the defense of the city while the dictator took an army into the field, while on other occasions the dictator remained at Rome to see to some important duty, and entrusted the magister equitum with an army in the field.

== See also ==
- Constitution of the Roman Republic
- Constitutional dictatorship – Dictatorship that is constitutionally granted in an emergency
- Dictator – Political leader who possesses absolute power
