= Gaius Claudius Marcellus (praetor 80 BC) =

Roman senator

- Office: Praetor (80 BC); Governor of Sicily (79 BC)
- Children: Gaius Claudius Marcellus

Gaius Claudius Marcellus (c. 120 BC – 50 BC or after) was a Roman senator.

== Life ==
Marcellus was praetor apparently in 80 BC, and afterwards succeeded M. Aemilius Lepidus in the government of Sicily. He found that province in a state of great distress and confusion from the exactions and oppressions of his predecessor; but by the mildness and justice of his administration, he restored it to such a flourishing state, that Cicero tells he was looked upon by the Sicilians as the second savior of their country. Statues were erected to him in almost every city of the island; and the festival of the Marcellea already instituted in honor of his ancestor, Marcus Claudius Marcellus, was now renewed in his favor. Cicero, throughout his speeches against Verres, dwelled frequently upon the administration of Marcellus, as affording the most striking contrast to that of the accused. By a singular accident, Marcellus himself was present on that occasion, as one of the judges of Verres.

Marcellus held the office of augur, in which Cicero was one of his colleagues, and is cited by him as one of those who regarded the whole science of augury as a merely political institution. He lived to see his son, also called Gaius Claudius Marcellus, elected consul for the year 50 BC; and on that occasion Cicero wrote him a letter of congratulation. Elsewhere also the latter dwells in the strongest manner upon the respect and affection with which he had always regarded Marcellus.
