= Marcus Claudius Marcellus (consul 51 BC) =

Roman politician

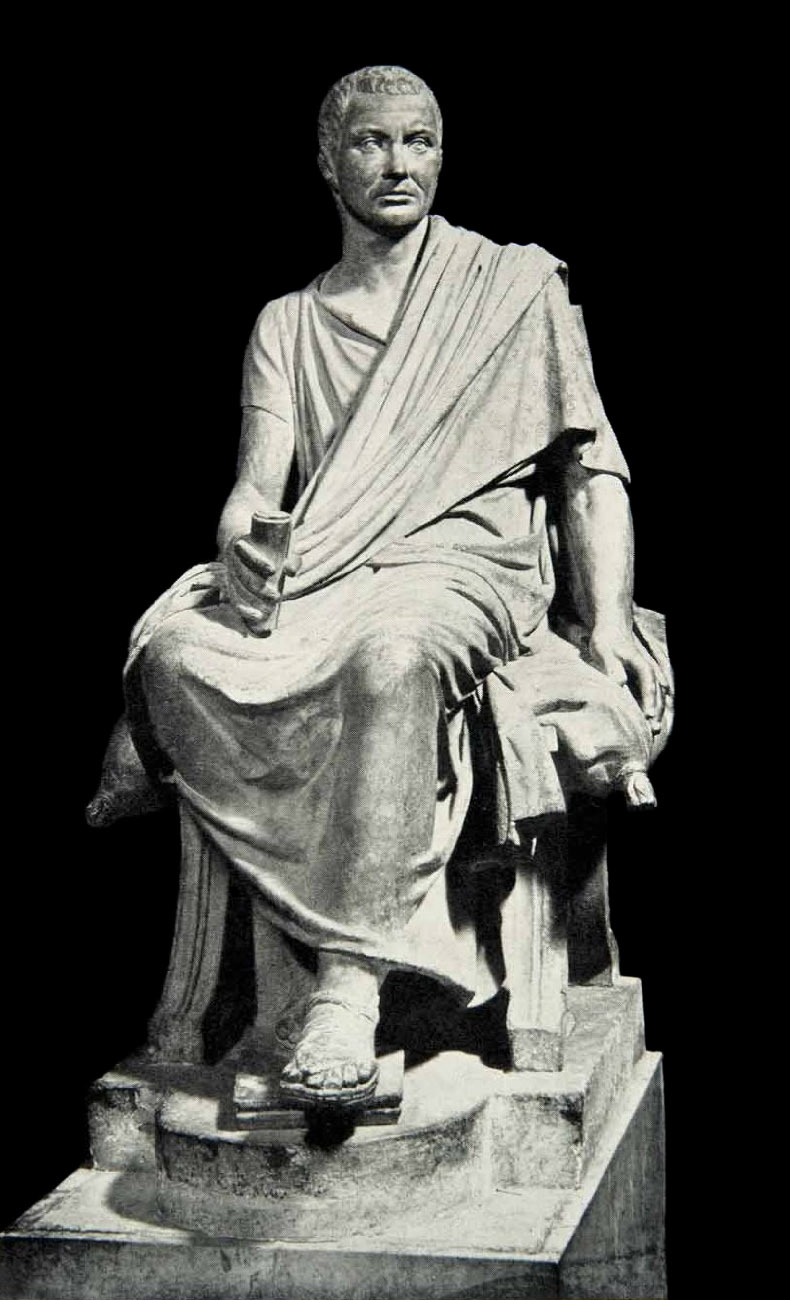
Statue of Marcellus

Marcus Claudius Marcellus (c. 95 BC – 45 BC) was a Roman politician who was elected consul in 51 BC.

== Early life ==
Marcellus was the son of another Marcus Claudius Marcellus, aedile curulis in 91 BC; the brother of Gaius Claudius Marcellus Maior, consul in 49 BC and the cousin of Gaius Claudius Marcellus Minor, consul in 50 BC.

== Career ==
Marcellus was elected curule aedile in 56 BC. In 52 BC he was elected consul, together with Servius Sulpicius Rufus, for the following year. During his consulship, Marcellus proved himself to be a zealous partisan of Pompey and the optimates, and urged the Senate to extreme measures against Julius Caesar, managing to establish that the subject of recalling Caesar should be discussed on 1 March of the following year. He also considered the lex Vatinia invalid, removing Roman citizenship from citizens of Comum, and caused a senator of Comum, who happened to be in Rome, to be scourged, a punishment Roman citizens were exempted from under the Lex Porcia.

Upon the start of Caesar's civil war, Marcellus fled Rome with the optimates and joined the Republican army in Epirus. After the Battle of Pharsalus, Marcellus abandoned opposition to Caesar, and withdrew in an honorable exile to Mytilene, where he was left unmolested by Caesar. His cousin Gaius Claudius Marcellus petitioned the dictator for clemency, as did Cicero in his Pro Marcello. This was granted near the close of 46 BC, though Marcellus did not start out for Rome until the middle of 45 BC. En route near Athens he was murdered by one of his own attendants, P. Magius Chilo, an event that some attributed to Caesar, but Cicero suggested that it was almost certainly caused by a dispute between Magius and Marcellus.

Political offices
Preceded by Pompey; Q. Caecilius Metellus Pius Scipio Nasica	Consul of the Roman Republic; 51 BC; With: Servius Sulpicius Rufus	Succeeded by L. Aemilius Paullus; G. Claudius Marcellus
