= Servius Sulpicius Rufus =

Roman orator, jurist and consul (c.105 BC–43 BC)

Servius Sulpicius Rufus (c. 105 BC – 43 BC), was a Roman orator and jurist. He was consul in 51 BC.

== Biography ==
=== Early life ===
He studied rhetoric with Cicero, accompanying him to Rhodes in 78 BC, though Sulpicius decided subsequently to pursue legal studies with Lucius Lucilius Balbus. In the later dialogue Brutus, Cicero praised the artistry of his legal learning as well as his eloquence.

=== Career ===
In 63 BC, Sulpicius was a candidate for the consulship, but was defeated by Lucius Licinius Murena, whom he subsequently accused of bribery. In Cicero's successful oration in defense of Murena against the accusations, he mocked Sulpicius' legal expertise despite their friendship. Nevertheless, in 52 BC Sulpicius successfully stood for election to be consul in 51 BC.

In the Civil War, Sulpicius was a supporter of Pompey, while his son joined Julius Caesar. Caesar made him proconsul of Achaea in 46 BC. He died in 43 BC while on a mission (Latin: in legatione) from the senate to Marcus Antonius at Mutina, and was eulogized in Cicero's ninth Philippic. Sulpicius was accorded a public funeral; the people erected a statue to his memory in front of the Rostra of Augustus.

Two excellent specimens of Sulpicius's style are preserved in Cicero's letters. One of these is a letter of condolence to Cicero after the death of his daughter, Tullia. It is a letter that posterity has much admired, full of subtle, melancholy reflection on the transiency of all things. Byron quotes from this letter in his Childe Harold's Pilgrimage. The other is an excellently clear account of the murder of his ex-colleague Marcus Claudius Marcellus (consul 51 BC) in Piraeus (the port of Athens) in 45 BC. Quintilian speaks of three orations by Sulpicius as still in existence; one of these was the speech against Murena, another Pro or Contra Aufidium, of whom nothing is known.

It is as a jurist, however, that Sulpicius was chiefly distinguished. He left behind him a large number of treatises, and he is often quoted in the Pandects, although direct extracts are not found. His chief characteristics were lucidity, an intimate acquaintance with the principles of civil and natural law, and an unrivaled power of expression.

== Personal life ==
Servius Sulpicius Rufus was married to Postumia, they had at least one child, a son by the same name. The son was likely the father of Sulpicia, who is the only identified Roman female poet whose poetry is known to have survived.

== See also ==
- Sulpicia gens

== Notes ==
Political offices
Preceded by Pompey; Q. Caecilius Metellus Pius Scipio	Consul of the Roman Republic; 51 BC; With: M. Claudius Marcellus	Succeeded by L. Aemilius Paullus; G. Claudius Marcellus
