= Tiberius Sempronius Gracchus (consul 238 BC) =

Ancient Roman general and statesman

- Years active: c. 246–238 BC
- Office: Plebeian aedile (246 BC); Consul (238 BC)
- Children: Tiberius

Tiberius Sempronius Gracchus (fl. 238 BC), a Roman republican consul in the year 238 BC, was the first man from his branch of the family to become consul. (Several other plebeian Sempronii had already reached the consulship and even the censorship.)

He was the father of the homonymous consul of 215 and 213 BC who served in the Second Punic War, and the great-grandfather of reformist Gracchi brothers: Tiberius and Gaius Gracchus.

== Career ==
Gracchus first appears as plebeian aedile in 246 BC. He and his colleague, Gaius Fundanius Fundulus, built a temple to Libertas on the Aventine hill from revenue collected from various fines.

He served as consul for 238 BC; during his consulship, he occupied Sardinia and campaigned in Liguria. His patrician colleague was Publius Valerius Falto. He apparently vowed to dedicate a temple, not completed in his lifetime. That temple was completed and dedicated by his homonymous elder son, the consul of 215 BC and 213 BC.

== Family and descendants ==
His son was the Tiberius Sempronius Gracchus who was consul in 215 and 213 BC. This Gracchus had two sons:

- Tiberius Sempronius Gracchus, who was elected to the priesthood in 203 BC at a very young age, and who died in the plague of 174 BC.
- Tiberius Veturius Gracchus Sempronianus, who replaced his dead kinsman as augur, and whose name indicates that he was born a Sempronius and adopted into the patrician Veturii.

Other descendants include:

- Publius Sempronius Gracchus, of whom almost nothing is known. He had married and fathered a son, Tiberius Gracchus by 217 BC, and may have died during the Second Punic War.
  - Tiberius Gracchus (c. 217 BC–c. 150 BC), who married Scipio's younger daughter and was twice consul in 177 and 163 BC.
    - Sempronia, wife and widow of her mother's cousin Scipio Aemilianus; no issue.
    - Tiberius Gracchus (c. 163 BC–133 BC), his three sons all died young.
    - Gaius Gracchus (154–123 BC).

=== Other possible descendants ===
- The tribune of the plebs, Publius Sempronius Gracchus, who attacked Manius Acilius Glabrio (consul 191 BC) and others for corrupt practices and forced him to withdraw his candidacy for censor, may have been another grandson, but this is not certain.
- A late first-century BC descendant may have been the Tiberius Sempronius Gracchus who was condemned to exile on an island for being Julia the Elder's lover.

== See also ==
- Sempronia gens
- List of Roman Republican consuls

== Sources ==
Sources

- Broughton, Thomas Robert Shannon (1951). The magistrates of the Roman republic. Vol. 1. New York: American Philological Association.
- Livy. History of Rome.

Political offices
| Preceded by Gaius Mamilius Turrinus and Quintus Valerius Falto | Consul of the Roman Republic with Publius Valerius Falto; 238 BC | Succeeded by Lucius Cornelius Lentulus Caudinus and Quintus Fulvius Flaccus |
