= Publius Valerius Falto =

Publius Valerius Falto was a Roman politician of the 3rd century BC.

Publius followed his brother, Quintus Valerius Falto, as consul, being elected to that office in 238 BC alongside Tiberius Sempronius Gracchus. He led a consular army against the Boii, who had allied with the Ligures and some other Celtic tribes along the Po. The first confrontation resulted in defeat, so the Senate sent the Praetor Marcus Genucius Cipus to relieve his army; however, viewing this as an intrusion, Publius attacked a second time and won. On his return he was denied a triumph because of his rash actions following the initial defeat.

Political offices
Preceded by Gaius Mamilius Turrinus and Quintus Valerius Falto	Consul of the Roman Republic; 238 BC; With: Tiberius Sempronius Gracchus	Succeeded by Lucius Cornelius Lentulus Caudinus and Quintus Fulvius Flaccus
