= Battle of Capua (212 BC) =

212 BC battle

First Battle of Capua
- Part of the Second Punic War
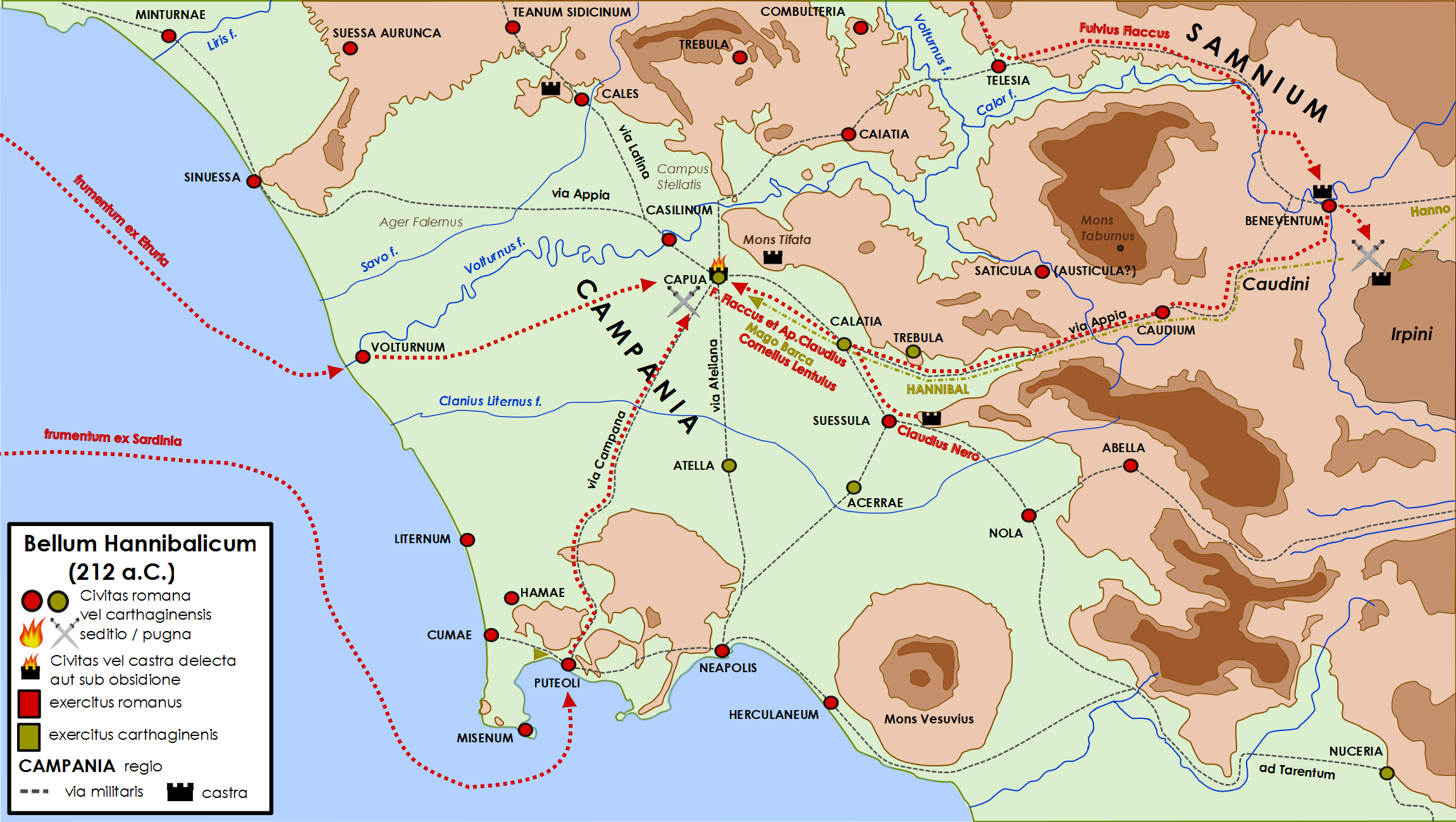
- Operations in Campania during the 212 BC campaign
Date	212 BC
Location	Capua, present-day Italy 41.0833°N 14.2500°E
Result	Carthaginian victory

Belligerents
Carthage	Roman Republic

Commanders and leaders
Hannibal	Quintus Fulvius Flaccus, Appius Claudius Pulcher

Strength
Field army: 30,000; 6,000 Capuans	4 Roman legions, approximately 40,000

Casualties and losses
Unknown	1,500 killed

The First Battle of Capua was fought in 212 BC between Hannibal Barca and two Roman consular armies. The Roman force was led by two consuls, Quintus Fulvius Flaccus and Appius Claudius Pulcher. The Roman force was defeated, but managed to escape. Hannibal temporarily managed to raise the siege of Capua. A tactical Carthaginian victory, it ultimately did not help the Capuans.

== Strategic situation ==
In Italy, the Romans had fielded at least four armies. The Consular armies were poised to attack Capua, while an army under Tiberius Sempronius Gracchus was active in Lucania. Legions were also stationed in Rome, Samnium, and northern Italy. Romans had retaken Arpi, Casilinum, and Sussela from the Carthaginians.

Hannibal had enjoyed considerable success, as Thurii, Metapontum, and Heraclea had fallen under Carthaginian control. Hanno, son of Bomilcar, was active in Bruttium. All of Magna Graecia except Rhegium and Tarentum was allied to Carthage. Hannibal was in southern Italy, trying to gain control of the citadel of Tarentum after the city had fallen to him in 213 BC.

In Iberia, the Romans and Carthaginians were deadlocked, with neither side gaining any decisive advantage. In fact, the situation was favourable enough for Hasdrubal Barca to move to Africa and crush the rebellion of Syphax without the Scipios gaining any advantages in Iberia.

In Sicily, the Siege of Syracuse continued. On the whole, the Romans under Marcus Claudius Marcellus had gained the upper hand. The Carthaginians had not recovered from the ravages of pestilence which had decimated their army.

== Prelude ==
Capua had defected to Hannibal after the Battle of Cannae in 216 BC. Hannibal had made Capua his winter quarter in 215 BC and had conducted his campaigns against Nola and Casilinum from there. The Romans had recaptured Casilinum, crucial for attacking Capua, in 214 BC. Since then they had conducted annual raids during harvest time to prevent the Capuans from gathering provisions.

In 212 BC, the elected consuls, Appius Claudius and Quintus Fulvius Flaccus, resolved to besiege Capua. The Roman army of eight legions (four Roman and four allied) encamped near Capua in the spring of 212 BC. This had prompted the Capuans to appeal to Hannibal for aid. In response to their appeal, Hanno and his army moved north from Bruttium and collected provisions for Capua then encamped near Beneventum. The Capuan authorities were slow in providing the carts for carrying provisions. The Romans under Fulvius Flaccus attacked Hanno's camp while most of his men were foraging and captured it after initial setbacks. Hanno retired to Bruttium, leaving the Romans in command of the situation. The Capuans again sent an appeal for help to Hannibal.

In response, Hannibal sent 2,000 Numidian cavalry under Bostar and Hanno as reinforcements to Capua. The Romans called on Tiberius Sempronius Gracchus to join their armies around Capua with his force, but he was ambushed in Lucania, and with his death his army dispersed.

== Battle ==
The Numidians, along with the Capuan cavalry, raided the Roman camp, winning several skirmishes and causing casualties among the Romans. The Romans were waiting for Gracchus to reinforce them with additional cavalry and did not start any general action against Capua. However, before the expected reinforcements arrived, Hannibal and his army moved into Campania, and encamped on Mount Tifata on the eastern side of Capua. After three days he offered battle, and the Romans accepted the challenge. The battle was a long drawn out affair with neither side gaining any decisive advantage, but again the Numidians gained considerable success against the Roman cavalry. However, seeing horsemen approaching from the south, both armies broke off action and retired to their respective camps. The horsemen turned out to be the cavalry of Gracchus, under the command of Cornelius, a junior officer, coming to join the consular armies.

== Aftermath ==
Although the Battle of Capua did not produce a decisive result, the Roman consuls decided to split their armies and withdraw from Campania altogether. Whether this was a result of casualties or part of a deliberate strategy, it resulted in Fulvius Flaccus moving towards Cumae, while Appius Claudius moved into Lucania. Hannibal entered Capua, and then set off in pursuit of Claudius. Appius Claudius and part of his army managed to slip past Hannibal, but a Roman army under Marcus Centenius Paenula was wiped out in the Battle of the Silarus. Hannibal, having raised the siege of Capua, moved to attack Brundisium. The Roman consuls decided to besiege Capua again in the absence of Hannibal. Neither side gained any decisive strategic advantage from this battle.
