= Gaius Claudius Centho =

Gaius Claudius Centho or Cento was a 3rd-century BC member of a prominent and wealthy patrician Roman Republican family. He was the third son of Appius Claudius Caecus, and a member of the Claudii. He was consul in the year 240 BC. He was Roman censor in 225, interrex in 217, and Roman dictator in 213.

Though little is known about his life, Cicero mentions his consulship in his Tusculanae Disputationes, and Livy mentions his service as interrex, after which Publius Cornelius Scipio Asina oversaw the election of Lucius Aemilius Paullus and Gaius Terentius Varro as consuls for 216 BC. He was appointed dictator by the consul Tiberius Sempronius Gracchus in order to oversee the election of new consuls in 213 BC.

== Notes ==
Political offices
Preceded by Aulus Manlius Torquatus Atticus and Quintus Lutatius Cerco	Consul of the Roman Republic with Marcus Sempronius Tuditanus; 240 BC	Succeeded by Gaius Mamilius Turrinus and Quintus Valerius Falto
