= Haec ornamenta mea =

Latin phrase meaning "These are my jewels"

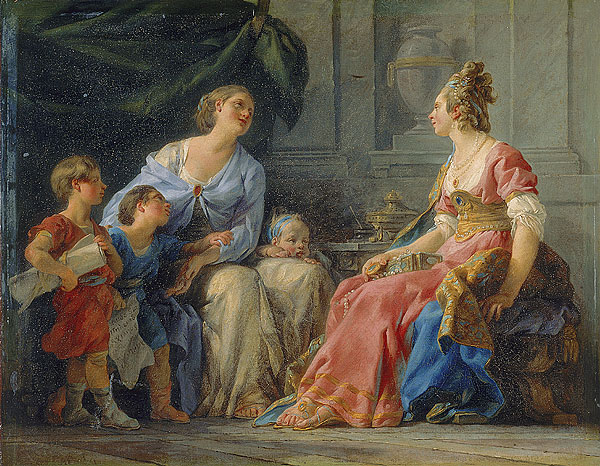
Cornelia, mother of the Gracchi, by Noël Hallé (1779, Musée Fabre)

Haec ornamenta mea is a Latin phrase meaning "These are my jewels" or "These are my ornaments". The expression is attributed to Cornelia Africana (c. 190 – c. 100 BC) by Valerius Maximus in his Factorum ac dictorum memorabilium libri IX, IV, 4, incipit, where he related an anecdote demonstrating Cornelia's devotion to and admiration for two of her sons, the Gracchi brothers (Tiberius and Gaius Gracchus). When women friends questioned Cornelia about her mode of dress and personal adornment, which was far more simple and understated than was usual for a wealthy Roman woman of her rank and station, Cornelia indicated her two sons and said this famous locution.

The original text differs slightly, since in reality Valerius Maximus wrote: haec ... ornamenta sunt mea.

The phrase is used by some writers to dedicate a book to their dearest relatives.
