= Publius Claudius Pulcher (consul 184 BC) =

Publius Claudius Pulcher was son of Appius Claudius Pulcher (consul 212 BC) and brother of Appius Claudius Pulcher (consul 185 BC), and Gaius Claudius Pulcher (consul 177 BC). In 189 BC, he was curule aedile, and in 188 BC praetor. He was elected to the consulship through the devices of his brother in 184 BC, and in 181 BC he was one of the three commissioners appointed for planting a colony at Graviscae, a city on the coast of Etruria between Cosa and Castrum Novum.

== Notes ==
Political offices
| Preceded by Appius Claudius Pulcher; Marcus Sempronius Tuditanus | Roman consul 184 BC with Lucius Porcius Licinus | Succeeded by Marcus Claudius Marcellus; Quintus Fabius Labeo |
