= Quintus Fulvius Flaccus (consul 237 BC) =

Roman consul (c. 277 BC – 202 BC)

Quintus Fulvius Flaccus (c. 277 BC – 202 BC), son of Marcus Fulvius Flaccus (consul 264 BC), was consul in 237, 224, 212 and 209 BC. In 231 BC. he became censor with Titus Manlius Torquatus.

== See also ==
- List of ancient Roman consuls

Political offices
Preceded by Ti. Sempronius Gracchus; Publius Valerius Falto	Roman consul 237 BC; With: L. Cornelius Lentulus Caudinus	Succeeded by P. Cornelius Lentulus Caudinus; Gaius Licinius Varus
Preceded by Gaius Atilius Bulbus; Aulus Postumius Albinus	Roman censor 231 BC; With: Titus Manlius Torquatus	Succeeded by Q. Fabius Maximus Verrucosus; Marcus Sempronius Tuditanus
Preceded by Lucius Aemilius Papus; Gaius Atilius Regulus	Roman consul II; 224 BC; With: Titus Manlius Torquatus II	Succeeded by Gaius Flaminius; Publius Furius Philus
Preceded by Quintus Fabius Maximus; Ti. Sempronius Gracchus II	Roman consul III; 212 BC; With: Appius Claudius Pulcher	Succeeded by Gn. Fulvius Centumalus Maximus; P. Sulpicius Galba Maximus
Preceded by Marcus Claudius Marcellus IV; Marcus Valerius Laevinus	Roman consul IV; 209 BC; With: Q. Fabius Maximus Verrucosus V	Succeeded by Marcus Claudius Marcellus V Titus Quinctius Crispinus
