= Porcia gens =

Ancient Roman family

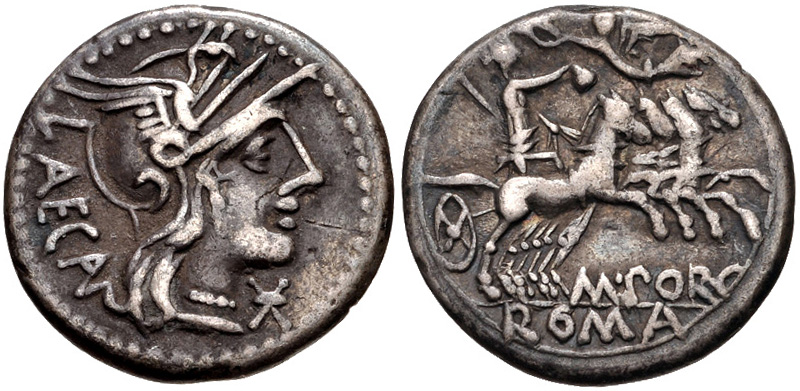
Denarius of Marcus Porcius Laeca, 125 BC. The reverse picture Libertas in a chariot, holding a pileus, the symbol of freedom, a reference to the Lex Porcia passed in 199 BC by his ancestor.

The gens Porcia, rarely written Portia, was a plebeian family at Ancient Rome. Its members first appear in history during the third century BC. The first of the gens to achieve the consulship was Marcus Porcius Cato in 195 BC, and from then until imperial times, the Porcii regularly occupied the highest offices of the Roman state.

== Origin ==
The nomen Porcius was derived from porcus, a pig. It belongs to a class of gentilicia derived from the names of common animals and objects, such as Asinius, Ovinius, Caprarius, and Taurus. (Note: From asinus, an ass; ovis, a sheep; capra, a she-goat; and taurus, a bull.) The Porcii were reputed to have come from the ancient city of Tusculum in Latium. This tradition was alluded to in a speech given by the emperor Claudius.

== Praenomina ==
The chief praenomina of the Porcii were Marcus and Lucius, two of the most common names throughout Roman history. The Porcii Catones favoured Marcus, almost to the exclusion of other praenomina, but occasionally used Lucius and Gaius, another extremely common name, while the Porcii Laecae favoured Publius and Marcus.

== Branches and cognomina ==
In the time of the Republic, there were three main branches of the Porcii, bearing the surnames Laeca, Licinus, and Cato, of which the most illustrious was Cato. Other cognomina are found under the Empire.

The surname Cato is said to have been bestowed upon Cato the Elder in consequence of his shrewdness; before this, Plutarch says that he bore the cognomen Priscus, "the elder". However, it may be that like Major, Priscus simply distinguished him from his descendant, Cato Uticensis, and was erroneously supposed to have dated to the elder Cato's lifetime. The same man also bore the epithets of Sapiens, the wise, Orator, and most famously, Censorius, from his tenure as censor.

The sons of Cato the Elder each bore the praenomen Marcus, but are distinguished as Cato Licinianus and Cato Salonianus, after their mothers, Licinia and Salonia. Licinianus was probably not used during its bearer's lifetime, as he was a grown man when his half-brother was born, and died when Salonianus was a small child. Although each brother left children, these surnames did not descend to them. Cato the Younger, a grandson of Saloninus, obtained the surname Uticensis from the city of Utica, where he met his death, but Plutarch refers to him as Cato Minor, to distinguish him from his ancestor.

== Members ==
This list includes abbreviated praenomina. For an explanation of this practice, see filiation.

=== Porcii Catones ===
- Marcus Porcius, the grandfather of Censorius, was said to have been a decorated soldier, who was compensated from the Roman treasury for the cost of five horses that had been killed from under him in battle.
- Marcus Porcius M. f., the father of Censorius, was described by his son as a brave man and a worthy soldier.
- Marcus Porcius M. f. M. n. Cato, surnamed Censorius, consul in 195 BC, and censor in 184. As a young man he served in the Second Punic War; as an old man he called for the final destruction of Carthage. Throughout his public career, Cato became famous for his austerity and strict moral code.
- Marcus Porcius M. f. M. n. Cato Licinianus, the son of Cato the Elder by his first wife, Licinia, served as a young man in the army of Lucius Aemilius Paullus during the Third Macedonian War. He afterward married Paullus' daughter, and became a jurist of some eminence. At the time of his death, about 152 BC, he was praetor designatus.
- Marcus Porcius M. f. M. n. Cato Salonianus, the son of Cato the Elder by second wife, Salonia, was born in 154 BC, when his father was eighty. He embarked on a public career, and obtained the praetorship, but died during his year of office.
- Marcus Porcius M. f. M. n. Cato, the elder son of Licinianus, was consul 118 BC. He was sent to Africa, perhaps in order to mediate between the heirs of Micipsa, the king of Numidia. Cato died while still in Africa.
- Gaius Porcius M. f. M. n. Cato, the younger son of Licinianus, was consul in 114 BC. He received the province of Macedonia, and suffered a defeat at the hands of the Scordisci. He was later fined for extortion in his government of the province. During the Jugurthine War, he allowed himself to be bribed by Jugurtha, and went into exile at Tarraco rather than face condemnation.
- Marcus Porcius M. f. M. n. Cato, the son of Salonianus, was tribune of the plebs. He married Livia, and was the father of Cato the Younger. He died while a candidate for the praetorship.
- Lucius Porcius M. f. M. n. Cato, the son of Salonianus, was consul in 89 BC. He was one of the Roman commanders during the Social War, and defeated the Etruscans in 90, but during his consulship he was slain toward the end of a skirmish with the Marsi near the Fucine lake.
- Marcus Porcius M. f. M. n. Cato, grandson of Licinianus, served as curule aedile, then praetor. He obtained the province of Gallia Narbonensis, and died during his year of office.
- Gaius Porcius Cato, perhaps a descendant of Cato Licinianus, was tribune of the plebs in 56 BC. Earlier in his career, he was sharply critical of the triumvir Pompeius, but he later became one of his supporters. Accused of violating proper procedures in bringing forward various laws, he was acquitted due to Pompeius' influence.
- Marcus Porcius M. f. M. n. Cato, better known as Cato the Younger, praetor in 54 BC, famed as an arch-conservative, for his austerity and strict morality, echoing that of his ancestor, Cato the Elder, was one of the leading opponents of Caesar. He took his own life at Utica, rather than allowing the city to fall into Caesar's hands while under his command, from which deed he obtained the surname Uticensis.
- Porcia M. f. M. n., sister of Cato the Younger, married Lucius Domitius Ahenobarbus, consul in 54 BC. Her husband was slain at Pharsalus in 48, and Porcia died late in 46 or early in 45. At her funeral, she was eulogized by Cicero and Varro.
- Porcia M. f. M. n., eldest daughter of Cato the Younger, married first Marcus Calpurnius Bibulus, and second Marcus Junius Brutus. After the murder of Caesar and the flight of her husband, the triumvirs allowed her to remain at Rome, but when she learned of Brutus' death at the Battle of Philippi, she took her own life.
- Marcus Porcius M. f. M. n. Cato, eldest son of Cato the Younger, was at Utica when his father died, but was spared by Caesar. After Caesar's death, Cato joined the party of his brother-in-law, Brutus. Unlike his father, he was outgoing, and a daring soldier. He fell in battle at Philippi in 42 BC.
- Porcius M. f. M. n. Cato, the second son of Cato the Younger, was sent to his father's friend, Munatius, in Bruttium, when his father fled Rome with Gnaeus Pompeius Magnus during the Civil War.
- Porcia M. f. M. n., the second daughter of Cato the Younger, remained with her mother at Rome when her father fled with Pompeius during the Civil War.
- Marcus Porcius Cato, consul suffectus ex Kal. Jul. in AD 36.
- Porcia, daughter of the consul of 36.

=== Porcii Licini ===
- Lucius Porcius M. f. Licinus, praetor in 207 BC, during the Second Punic War. He was assigned the province of Cisalpine Gaul, and helped bring about the defeat of Hasdrubal at the Battle of the Metaurus.
- Lucius Porcius L. f. M. n. Licinus, consul in 184 BC, carried on war against the Ligurians. During his year of office, he introduced a law that came to be known as the lex Porcia.
- Lucius Porcius L. f. L. n. Licinus, duumvir in 181 BC, dedicated the temple of Venus Erycina, which his father had vowed during the Ligurian War. In 172, Licinus was appointed to bring a fleet of ships from Rome to Brundisium, in preparation to carry an army to fight against Perseus.
- Lucius Porcius Licinus, issued coins depicting Mars as a spearman, driving a chariot. From the legend, the design is supposed to have been minted in 92 BC, but Eckhel suggests that it was issued earlier.
- Porcius Licinus, a poet who probably lived in the latter part of the second century BC. Only one epigram and two fragments of verse in trochaic septenarius survive from his body of work.

=== Porcii Laecae ===
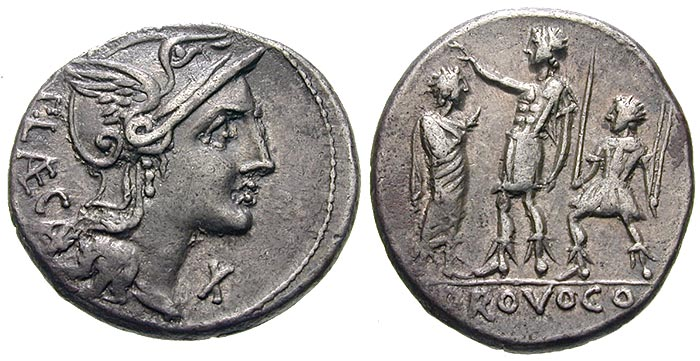
Denarius of Publius Porcius Laeca, circa 110 BC. The reverse shows a scene of Provocatio: a citizen (left) is appealing the decision of a governor (centre), who had summoned someone with rods (right) to punish him.

- Publius Porcius Laeca tribune of the plebs in 199 BC, he proposed of the lex Porcia of that year. In 196, he was one of the first of the triumviri epulones. The following year he was praetor, and was stationed near Pisae in order to assist the consul Lucius Valerius Flaccus against the Gauls and Ligurians.
- Publius Porcius P. f. Laeca, a senator circa 165 BC.
- Marcus Porcius Laeca, triumvir monetalis in 125 BC; his coins feature Libertas, a reference to the Lex Porcia passed by Publius Porcius Laeca, the tribune of 199.
- Publius Porcius Laeca, triumvir monetalis about 110 or 109 BC; his coins refer to the Lex de Porcia capita civium, which extended the right of Provocatio to Roman citizens in the provinces. He was possibly a tribune of the plebs during the early years of the first century BC.
- Marcus Porcius Laeca, a senator, and one of the leaders of the conspiracy of Catiline. The conspirators met at his house in November of 63 BC.

=== Others ===
- Marcus Porcius Latro, a celebrated rhetorician during the reign of Augustus.
- Porcius Festus, governor of Judea from approximately AD 58 to 62. He attempted to bring the highwaymen under control, and it is said that gave witness on behalf of Saint Paul.
- Porcius Septimius, procurator of Raetia under the emperor Vitellius.

== See also ==
- Porcian Laws, named for their enactment under three members of the Gens Porcia.
- List of Roman gentes
