= Lucius Cornelius Lentulus Caudinus (consul 237 BC) =

Roman consul 237 BC

Lucius Cornelius Lentulus Caudinus was a Roman politician in the third century BC.

== Family ==
His father was Lucius Cornelius Lentulus Caudinus, consul in 275 BC. His brother was Publius Cornelius Lentulus Caudinus, consul in 236 BC. His sons were Gnaeus Cornelius Lentulus consul in 201 BC, and Lucius Cornelius Lentulus who held the consulship in 199 BC.

== Career ==
In 237 BC, he served as consul, with Quintus Fulvius Flaccus as his colleague. In the following year, he was elected censor, and in 221 BC, he became pontifex maximus. He died around 213 BC.
