= Appius Claudius Pulcher (consul 185 BC) =

Appius Claudius Pulcher was a Roman politician of the 2nd century BC.

== Life ==
He was the son of Appius Claudius Pulcher (consul 212 BC) and the brother of Publius Claudius Pulcher (consul 184 BC) and Gaius Claudius Pulcher (consul 177 BC). In 197 BC and the three following years, he served as a military tribune under Titus Quinctius Flamininus in Greece in the war with Philip V of Macedon. He was again in Greece in 191 BC, serving first under Marcus Baebius Tamphilus in the war with Antiochus III the Great, and afterwards under the consul Manius Acilius Glabrio against the Aetolians. In 187 BC, he was made a praetor, and the governor of Tarentum, which fell to him by lot as his province. In 185 BC, he was elected as a consul, and gained some advantages over the Ingauni, a Ligurian tribe, and, by his violent interference at the comitia, procured the election of his brother Publius to the consulship. In 184 BC, when Philip was preparing for a new war with the Romans, Appius was sent at the head of an embassy into Macedon and Greece, to observe his movements and wrest from his grasp those cities of which he had made himself master. In 176 BC, he was a member of an embassy sent to the Aetolians to bring about a cessation of their internal hostilities and oppose the machinations of Perseus of Macedon.

== Notes ==
Political offices
Preceded by Spurius Postumius Albinus; Quintus Marcius Philippus	Roman consul 185 BC with Marcus Sempronius Tuditanus	Succeeded by Publius Claudius Pulcher; Lucius Porcius Licinus
