= Quintus Valerius Falto =

Roman statesman and general, Victor of the Aegates

Quintus Valerius Falto was a Roman general and statesman during the middle era of the Roman Republic. He fought in the final phase of the ongoing First Punic War; he led the Roman fleet to victory during the Battle of the Aegates, for which he was awarded a minor Triumph. Quintus was elected consul in 239 BC alongside Gaius Mamilius Turrinus. He was the brother of his successor, the consul Publius Valerius Falto who served in 238 BC.

Falto was also the first Praetor Peregrinus at Rome in 242 BC, the development of which was occasioned by the war with Carthage which required a second Praetor, but the consul of the year, Aulus Postumius Albinus, was not allowed to leave the city because he was also a priest of Mars. After his superior, Gaius Lutatius Catulus, was injured at the Siege of Drepana, Falto took over command of the Roman forces. He was in command of the Roman fleet that won the Battle of the Aegates. He conducted himself with such bearing that, on his return, he demanded to share in the triumph to which Catulus was entitled. His claim was rejected on the grounds that he was not the commanding officer. However, after arbitration under Aulus Atilius Calatinus which, again, ruled against him, the people insisted Falto deserved the honor, and so his triumph was held on 6 October 241 BC.

Political offices
Preceded by Gaius Claudius Centho and Marcus Sempronius Tuditanus	Roman consul of the Republic; 239 BC; With: Gaius Mamilius Turrinus	Succeeded by Tiberius Sempronius Gracchus and Publius Valerius Falto
