= Appius Claudius Pulcher (consul 212 BC) =

Roman general and statesman

Appius Claudius Pulcher (died 211 BC) was a Roman general and politician of the 3rd century BC, active in the Second Punic War.

== Family ==
He was the son of Publius Claudius Pulcher (consul 249 BC), and the father of Appius Claudius Pulcher (consul 185 BC), Publius Claudius Pulcher (consul 184 BC), and Gaius Claudius Pulcher (consul 177 BC). His daughter, Claudia, married Pacuvius Calavius, the chief magistrate of Capua in 217 BC.

== Career ==
In 217 BC, Claudius was an aedile. In the following year, he was a military tribune and fought at Cannae. Together with Publius Cornelius Scipio, he was raised to the supreme command by the troops who had fled to Canusium. In 215 BC, he was made praetor, and lead the survivors of the defeated army to Sicily, where his efforts to detach Hieronymus, the grandson of Hiero II, from his connection with the Carthaginians, were unsuccessful. He remained in Sicily the following year as propraetor and legatus to Marcus Claudius Marcellus, having charge of the fleet and the camp at Leontini. In 212 BC, he was elected consul, and in conjunction with his colleague Quintus Fulvius Flaccus undertook the siege of Capua. At the close of his year of office, in pursuance of a decree of the Senate, he went to Rome and created two new consuls. His own command was prolonged another year. In the battle against Hannibal's forces before Capua, he received a wound from whose effects he died shortly after the surrender of the city. He ineffectually opposed the infliction of the sanguinary vengeance that Fulvius took on the Capuans.

== In popular culture ==
Appius Claudius Pulcher was played by Dimitri Diatchenko in the 2006 film The Secret Under the Rose.

== Notes ==
Preceded by Quintus Fabius Maximus; Tiberius Sempronius Gracchus	Roman consul 212 BC with Quintus Fulvius Flaccus	Succeeded by Gnaeus Fulvius Centumalus Maximus; Publius Sulpicius Galba Maximus
