= Porcius Licinus =

Ancient Roman poet

Porcius Licinus (2nd century BC) was an ancient Roman poet, whom Aulus Gellius places between Valerius Aedituus and Q. Lutatius Catulus, consul in BC 102 or 104, and who, therefore, probably lived in the latter part of the second century BC. Gellius quotes an epigram of Licinus, which seems to be taken from the Greek, and likewise cites the commencement of a poem of his on the history of Roman poetry, written in trochaic tetrameters. He seems to be the same as the Porcius mentioned in the life of Terence, ascribed to Suetonius, but must not be confounded, as he has been by some modern writers, with the consul of this name.
