= Sempronia gens =

Ancient Roman family

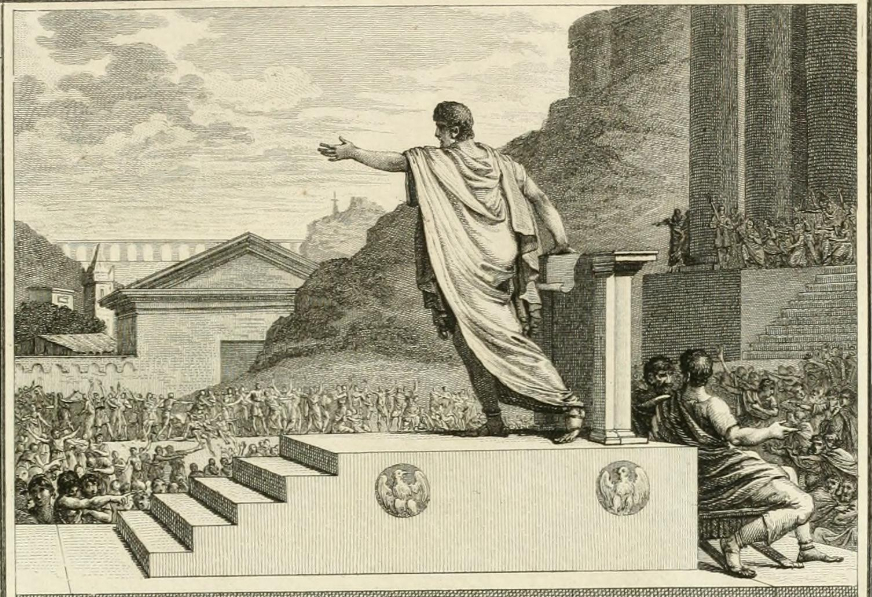
Gaius Sempronius Gracchus addressing the Plebeian Council

The gens Sempronia was one of the most ancient and noble houses of ancient Rome. Although the oldest branch of this gens was patrician, with Aulus Sempronius Atratinus obtaining the consulship in 497 BC, the thirteenth year of the Republic, from the time of the Samnite Wars onward, most if not all of the Sempronii appearing in history were plebeians. Although the Sempronii were illustrious under the Republic, few of them attained any importance or notice in imperial times.

== Praenomina ==
The praenomina favored by the patrician Sempronii were Aulus, Lucius, and Gaius. The plebeian families of the gens used primarily Gaius, Publius, Tiberius, and Marcus. The Tuditani used Marcus, Gaius, and Publius, while their contemporaries, the Gracchi, used Tiberius, Gaius, and Publius. Some families, including the Rutili and Muscae, used Titus instead of Tiberius.

== Branches and cognomina ==
Of the many branches of the Sempronia gens, the only family which was certainly patrician bore the cognomen Atratinus, a surname originally describing someone clad in black or mourning attire. Several of this family attained the highest offices of the Roman state under the early Republic, but the name does not occur again until 34 BC. Given the fashion for reviving old surnames in the late Republic, it seems improbable that this represented the direct line of the Sempronii Atratini, returning to prominence after more than three centuries in eclipse.

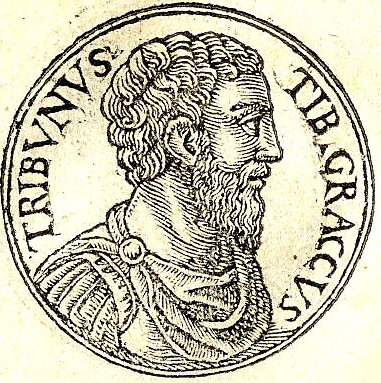
Tiberius Sempronius Gracchus, from Guillaume Rouillé's Promptuarii Iconum Insigniorum

Most or all of the other stirpes of the Sempronii were plebeian. Their surnames included Asellio, Blaesus, Densus, Gracchus, Longus, Musca, Pitio, Rufus, Rutilus, Sophus, and Tuditanus. Along with Atratinus, Gracchus and Pitio are found on coins.

Sophus, referring to someone regarded as "wise", belonged to a small, plebeian family that flourished from the time of the Samnite Wars down to the middle of the third century BC. Blaesus, originally indicating someone known for stammering, was the surname of a plebeian family that attained prominence during the Punic Wars. Tuditanus, which the philologist Lucius Ateius Praetextatus supposed to have been bestowed upon one of the Sempronii with a head like a tudes, or mallet, belonged to a family that flourished during the latter half of the third century BC.

Longus was a common surname, which usually referred to a person who was quite tall, although it could also mean "tedious". This family was prominent for a few decades, beginning around the start of the Second Punic War. Rutilus, or "reddish", usually referred to the color of someone's hair, and it marks a family that first appears in the early second century BC. A diminutive of Rufus, red, it may have belonged to the same family that later bore that surname. The cognomen Musca refers to a fly, a nickname might allude to someone's height, in contrast to Longus, or could refer to a person's persistence.

The Sempronii Gracchi were the most distinguished family of the gens. They belonged to the plebeian nobility, obtaining their first consulship during the First Punic War, and remaining prominent for over a century. Their surname, Gracchus, indicated a jackdaw. The Sempronii Gracchi included several accomplished statesmen and generals, but they are perhaps better remembered for the Gracchi brothers, who were martyred in the cause of agrarian reform. A few members of this family are mentioned under the early Empire, but they were of little consequence.

== Members ==
This list includes abbreviated praenomina. For an explanation of this practice, see filiation.

=== Sempronii Atratini ===
- Aulus Sempronius Atratinus, consul in 497 BC.
- Aulus Sempronius A. f. Atratinus, one of the first three consular tribunes in 444 BC, was compelled to resign along with his colleagues, as a result of a defect in the auspices.
- Lucius Sempronius A. f. Atratinus, elected consul in 444 BC, following the resignation of his brother and the other consular tribunes, became one of the first censors in 443.
- Aulus Sempronius L. f. A. n. Atratinus, consular tribune in 425, 420, and 416 BC.
- Gaius Sempronius A. f. A. n. Atratinus, consul in 423 BC.
- Aulus Sempronius Atratinus, magister equitum in 380 BC.

=== Sempronii Sophi ===
- Publius Sempronius P. f. C. n. Sophus, consul in 304 BC and censor in 300, triumphed over the Aequi.
- Publius Sempronius P. f. P. n. Sophus, consul in 268 BC, and censor in 252.

=== Sempronii Blaesi ===
- Gaius Sempronius Ti. f. Ti. n. Blaesus, consul in 253 and 244 BC, during the First Punic War.
- (Tiberius) Sempronius Blaesus, quaestor in 217 BC, during the Second Punic War, was killed during a raid upon the coast of Africa.
- Gaius Sempronius Blaesus, tribune of the plebs in 211 BC, was probably the same person who served as legate under the dictator Quintus Fulvius Flaccus the following year.
- Publius Sempronius Blaesus, tribune of the plebs in 191 BC, opposed the triumph of Publius Cornelius Scipio Nasica, but relented.
- Gaius Sempronius Blaesus, praetor in 184 BC, obtained Sicily as his province.

=== Sempronii Tuditani ===
- Marcus Sempronius C. f. M. n. Tuditanus, held the consulship in 240 BC, together with Gaius Claudius Centho as his colleague. Not much is known of his consulship. He served as censor in 230 BC.
- Publius Sempronius C. f. C. n. Tuditanus, censor in 209 BC and consul in 204, was a survivor of the Battle of Cannae. He defeated Hannibal during his consulship. (Note: See Livy, xxii. 50 for his actions, and xxii. 60 for the praise heaped on him by leading Roman senators, notably Titus Manlius Torquatus.)
- Marcus Sempronius Tuditanus, one of Scipio's officers at the capture of Carthago Nova in 209 BC.
- Gaius Sempronius Tuditanus, praetor in 197 BC, obtained Hispania Citerior as his province, and died of wounds received in battle the following year.
- Marcus Sempronius M. f. C. n. Tuditanus, consul in 185 BC, defeated the Apuani.
- Gaius Sempronius C. f. Tuditanus, perhaps one of the senior praetors in 146 BC, was that year sent with the consul Lucius Mummius in order to form the province of Achaia.
- Gaius Sempronius C. f. C. n. Tuditanus, an orator and historian and consul in 129 BC, triumphed over the Iapydes.
- Sempronia C. f. C. n., daughter of the consul Gaius Sempronius Tuditanus, she married Lucius Hortensius, and was the mother of the orator Quintus Hortensius.
- Sempronius Tuditanus, the grandfather of Fulvia, the wife of Marcus Antonius the triumvir, was described by Cicero as a madman, who liked to scatter his money among the people from the Rostra.
- Sempronia, the mother of Fulvia.
- Sempronia, implicated in the Catilinarian Conspiracy, was perhaps the aunt of Fulvia.

=== Sempronii Gracchi ===
- Tiberius Sempronius Ti. f. C. n. Gracchus, consul in 238 BC, carried on the First Punic War in Sardinia and Corsica.
- Tiberius Sempronius Ti. f. Ti. n. Gracchus, consul in 215 BC and 213 BC, during the Second Punic War, fell in battle against Mago.
- Publius Sempronius Ti. f. Ti. n. Gracchus, brother of the consul of 215 and 213 BC, and father of the consul of 177.
- Tiberius Sempronius Ti. f. Ti. n. Gracchus, elected augur in 203 BC, while still a young man, died in the great pestilence of 174 BC.
- Tiberius Sempronius Gracchus, commander of the allies in the war against the Gauls, under the consul Marcellus in 196 BC, fell in battle against the Boii.
- Tiberius Veturius Gracchus Sempronianus, apparently one of the Sempronii, who had been adopted into the gens Veturia, was subsequently elected augur to fill the vacancy caused by the death of Tiberius Sempronius Gracchus in 174 BC.
- Publius Sempronius Gracchus, tribune of the plebs in 189 BC, with his colleague, Gaius Sempronius Rutilus, charged Manius Acilius Glabrio, the consul of 191, with misappropriating part of the booty taken from Antiochus at Thermopylae.
- Tiberius Sempronius P. f. Ti. n. Gracchus, consul in 177 and 163 BC, and censor in 169, triumphed over the Celtiberi and the Sardinians; father of the brothers Gracchi.
- Tiberius Sempronius Ti. f. P. n. Gracchus, tribune of the plebs in 133 BC, carried a major agrarian law, and was afterwards slain in a riot instigated by Publius Cornelius Scipio Nasica Serapio.
- Gaius Sempronius Ti. f. P. n. Gracchus, tribune of the plebs in 123 and 122 BC, carried several major legal reforms; but as his opponents brought Rome to the brink of civil war, he was pursued from the city, and took his own life.
- Sempronia Ti. f. P. n., sister of the Gracchi, married Scipio Aemilianus.
- Tiberius Sempronius Gracchus, quadrumvir monetalis and quaestor-designate c. 40 BC or after.
- Tiberius Sempronius Gracchus, a lover of Julia, the daughter of Augustus, was banished in AD 2, and put to death upon the accession of Tiberius.
- Sempronius Gracchus, praetor in AD 33, presided over a tribunal judging matters of usury. Given the large number of accusations and the disruptive financial consequences likely to result from his adjudication, Gracchus brought the matter before the Senate. Subsequent attempts to rein in usurious practices in compliance with existing laws provoked a financial crisis.
- Gaius Sempronius Gracchus, praetor peregrinus in AD 37, is likely the same person who had accused the senator Granius Marcianus of maiestas two years earlier.
- (Lucius) Sempronius Gracchus, consul suffectus in AD 167.

=== Sempronii Longi ===
- Tiberius Sempronius C. f. C. n. Longus, consul in 218 BC, the first year of the Second Punic War, defeated by Hannibal at the Trebia.
- Tiberius Sempronius Ti. f. C. n. Longus, consul in 194 BC.
- Gaius Sempronius (Ti. f. Ti. n.) Longus, elected decemvir sacris faciundis in the place of Tiberius Sempronius Longus, the consul of 194 BC, who died in the great pestilence of 174.
- Publius Sempronius Longus, praetor in 184 BC, obtained Hispania Ulterior as his province.
- Gaius (Sempronius?) Longus, legate of a governor of Sicily in the 90s BC.

=== Sempronii Rutili ===
- Gaius Sempronius Rutilus, tribune of the plebs in 189 BC, together with his colleague, Publius Sempronius Gracchus, prosecuted Manius Acilius Glabrio, the consul of 191.
- Titus Sempronius Rutilus, the stepfather of Publius Aebutius, whom he disliked. His wife, Duronia, was indirectly responsible for the discovery of the Bacchanalia at Rome in 186 BC.
- Marcus Sempronius Rutilus, one of Caesar's legates in Gaul.
- Marcus (Sempronius) Rutilus, proconsul in Asia Minor in an uncertain date. Possibly identical with Caesar's legate.

=== Sempronii Muscae ===
- Titus Sempronius Musca, one of five commissioners appointed to settle the disputes between the Pisani and the Lunenses, in 168 BC.
- Aulus Sempronius Musca, mentioned along with his brother, Marcus, by Cicero in De Oratore.
- Marcus Sempronius Musca, mentioned along with his brother, Aulus, by Cicero in De Oratore.
- Sempronius Musca, scourged Gaius Gellius to death after detecting him in the act of adultery with his wife.

=== Sempronii Aselliones ===
- Sempronius Asellio, a military tribune under Scipio Aemilianus in 133 BC, wrote a history of his times.
- Lucius (Sempronius?) Asellio or Asullius, praetor about 92 BC, restored Sicily after the slave revolt there. (Note: Mentioned only by Diodorus, who calls him Lucius Asullius. This was traditionally emended to (Sempronius) Asellio, and Badian considered Lucius to be an older brother of Aulus Sempronius Asellio, praetor in 89. One recent reassessment of the evidence argues in favor of Asullius rather than Sempronius being his nomen.)
- Aulus Sempronius Asellio, praetor urbanus in 89 BC, was lynched by a mob of creditors after introducing debt relief measures during the financial difficulties of the Social War.

=== Others ===
- Publius Sempronius, prefect of the allies in 194 BC, was slain in battle by the Boii while serving under the consul Tiberius Sempronius Longus.
- Lucius Sempronius Pitio, triumvir monetalis in 148 BC.
- Aulus Sempronius A. f., a senator circa 140 BC. He might be identical with Aulus Sempronius Musca, or may alternatively be an Asellio.
- Gaius Sempronius C. f., a senator in 129 BC.
- Sempronia, the wife of Decimus Junius Brutus, consul in 77 BC.
- Gaius Sempronius Rufus, a friend of Cicero, was accused by Marcus Tuccius in 51 BC.
- Lucius Sempronius L. f. L. n. Atratinus, consul suffectus in 34 BC, was a friend of Cicero, and the prosecutor of Marcus Caelius Rufus, whom Cicero defended.
- Sempronius Densus, centurion of a praetorian cohort, gave his life in AD 69, while attempting to defend Licinianus, adopted son of the emperor Galba, or in some accounts the emperor himself.
- Sempronius Rufus, a friend of the younger Pliny.
- Titus Sempronius Rufus, consul suffectus in AD 113.
- Lucius Sempronius Merula Auspicatus, consul suffectus in AD 121.
- Marcus Sempronius Liberalis, governor of Egypt from AD 154 to 159.
- Sempronius Rufus, a eunuch from Hispania, who had committed various crimes, but had great influence over the emperor Caracalla.

== See also ==
- List of Roman gentes
