= Valerius Aedituus =

1st-century BC Roman poet

Valerius Aedituus was a Roman poet of the 2nd or 1st century BCE. He is known for his epigrams; otherwise, there is very little information, what there is being in the form of literary references. Aulus Gellius, a 2nd-century Roman author, describes him as an "early poet" ("veteris poetae") and states, regarding his work and that of Porcius Licinus and Quintus Lutatius Catulus that "nothing can be found neater, more graceful, more polished and more terse than those verses, either in Greek or in Latin." The classicist David Oliver Ross Jr. suggests that Gellius's description of Aedituus as an "early poet" implies he lived at a much earlier date than Licinus and Catulus, perhaps around 150 BCE. Furthermore, Ross argues that the surviving poetry of Aedituus is archaic in nature, on account of its proclivity for alliteration, which is not found in other quoted poems of Licinus and Catulus. However, the classicist Alan Cameron argues that the passage is instead supposed to establish a contrast between all three aforementioned Latin poets and later generation of the 1st-century BCE poets Catullus and Calvus, in which case the former group would all have lived roughly around the same time, perhaps about 100 BCE. This trio of authors—Licinus, Catulus, and Aedituus—perhaps published their work as part of an anthology, as indicated by both their citations in the works of Gellius and also their mention of the works of the 2nd-century author Apuleius, who lists them in the exact same order as Gellius.

One of Aedituus's surviving poems describes his own intense feelings of arousal at the thought of confessing his love to a woman named Pamphlia. This poem is likely heavily modeled after Sappho 31, wherein Sappho describe her own intense passion for a woman. Both Sappho and Aedituus express their intense love in similar terms, with both stating that they were unable to speak, felt as if they were dying, and both describing their emotions using heat as a metaphor. Aedituus in particular mentions dripping sweat ("sudor") and he states, at the end, that he refrains and "dies" ("dum pudeo, pereo"). The poem does, however, differ from Sappho in some ways: Aedituus's beloved is not being courted by another individual, and the poem was also composed utilizing elegiac couplets and notSapphic meter.

Within the poem, Aedituus describes his own ardor with the adjective subidus, a hapax legomenon perhaps etymologically connected with the verb subō ("to be in heat"), a word otherwise only ever used to describe sexually aroused women or female animals in heat. According to the classicist Christina Clark, the usage of this term in the poem could be construed as an attempt to emasculate Aedituus or portray his desire in animalistic terms. The possible emasculation of Aedituus is perhaps reinforced by the mention of "words fail[ing his] lips," which—according to Clark—could serve to unman him given "the high value put on speech in Roman male elite culture." Ultimately, Clark proposes that if the poem is interpreted as conveying the emasculation of Aedituus, then the broader theme of the text is that his own lovesickness has rendered him weak, unable to even "act or speak or get what he wants."

In his second preserved epigram, which is also a love poem, Aedituus begins by addressing an individual named Phileros, who was probably his slave. Aedituus asks this person why he is carrying a torch, for the "flame shining in [Aedituus's] heart" is sufficient enough light ("lucet pectore flamma satis"). This passage also borrows heavily from Hellenic sources, for the idea of a metaphorical internal fire burning so bright as to remove the need for a physical torch is already found in a fragment of The Greek Anthology, and the general idea of fire as representative of passion appears throughout Ancient Greek poetry. This epigram is similar to the following poem by Licinus mentioned in the Attic Nights, wherein the lover is explicitly equated with fire ("ignis homost," "the man is fire"). Another Roman author, Publius Syrus, also compares lovers to torches, stating "the lover is thus like a torch: he blazes the more he is moved" ("amans ita ut fax agitando ardescit magis"). However, unlike Syrus and Licinus—where the lover is merely likened to a fire—Aedituus states that the passion of love is outright stronger than a torch.

== Notes ==
=== Bibliography ===
- Cameron, Alan (1993-04-29). The Greek Anthology: from Meleager to Planudes. Oxford University PressOxford. doi:10.1093/oso/9780198140238.001.0001. ISBN 978-0-19-814023-8.
- Clark, Christina A. (2008). "The Poetics of Manhood? Nonverbal Behavior in Catullus 51". Classical Philology. 103 (3). The University of Chicago Press: 257–281. doi:10.1086/596517. ISSN 0009-837X.
- Duff, J. Wight (1932), A Literary History of Rome: From the Origins to the Close of the Golden Age (3rd ed.), New York: Charles Scribner's Sons
- Hallett, Judith P. (2002), "Sulpicia and the Valerii", in Flensted-Jensen, Pernille; Mejer, Jorgen; Nielsen, Thomas; Schwartz, Adam; Tortzen, Gorm (eds.), Noctes Atticae: Articles on Graeco-Roman Antiquity and its Nachleben (1st ed.), Museum Tusculanum Press, ISBN 9788772897783
- Ross Jr, David Oliver (1969). Style and Tradition in Catullus. Loeb Classical Monographs. s.l: Harvard University Press. doi:10.4159/harvard.9780674432291. ISBN 978-0-674-43229-1.
- Vardi, Amiel D. (2000). "An anthology of early Latin epigrams? A ghost reconsidered". The Classical Quarterly. 50 (1): 147–158. doi:10.1093/cq/50.1.147. ISSN 0009-8388.
