= Cornelia (mother of the Gracchi) =

2nd century BC Roman noblewoman, mother of the Gracchi

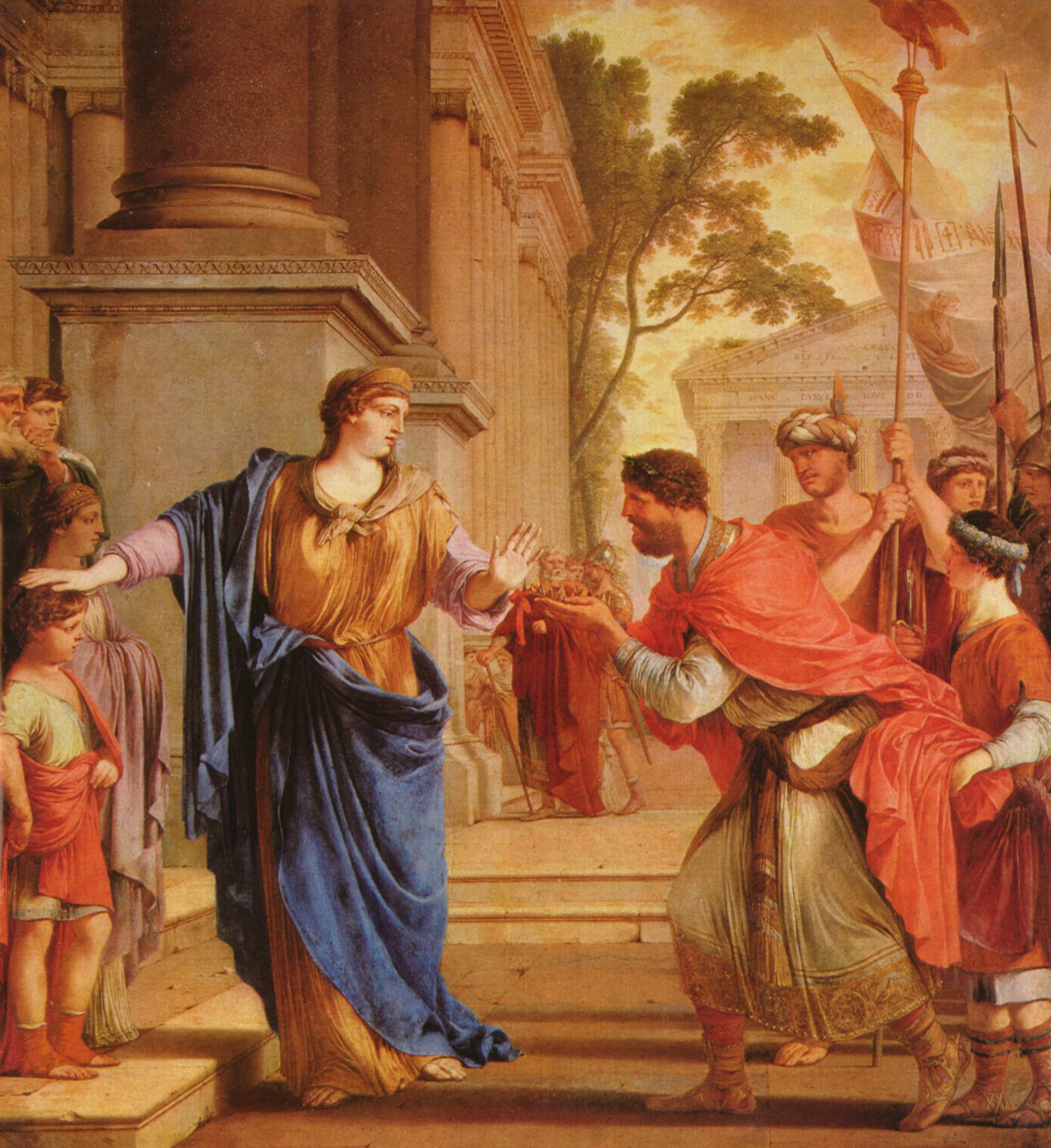
Cornelia pushes away Ptolemy's crown, by Laurent de La Hyre

Cornelia (c. 190s–c. 115 BC) was the second daughter of Publius Cornelius Scipio Africanus, a Roman general prominent in the Second Punic War, and Aemilia Paulla. Although drawing similarities to prototypical examples of virtuous Roman women, such as Lucretia, Cornelia puts herself apart from the rest because of her interest in literature, writing, and her investment in the political careers of her sons. She was the mother of the Gracchi brothers, and the mother-in-law of Scipio Aemilianus.

== Biography ==
Cornelia married Tiberius Sempronius Gracchus, grandson of Tiberius Sempronius Gracchus, when he was already in middle age. The union proved to be a happy one, and together they had 12 children, an unusually high number by Roman standards. Six of the children were boys and six were girls. Only three are known to have survived childhood: Sempronia, who married her cousin Publius Cornelius Scipio Aemilianus, and the two Gracchi brothers (Tiberius and Gaius Gracchus), who would defy the political institutions of Rome with their attempts at popular reforms.

After her husband's death, Cornelia chose to remain a widow while still enjoying a princess-like status and set herself to educating her children. She is said to have been so virtuous and dutiful to the memory of her husband that she even refused the marriage proposal of King Ptolemy VIII Physcon. However, her refusal could equally be justified by the fact that she had a desire for more independence and freedom in the manner in which her children were to be raised.

Later in her life, Cornelia studied literature, Latin, and Greek. Cornelia took advantage of the Greek scholars she brought to Rome, notably the philosophers Blossius (from Cumae) and Diophanes (from Mytilene), who were to educate young men. She had been taught the importance of receiving an education and came to play an extensive role in her sons' education during the "bygone republican era," resulting in the creation of a "superior breed of Roman political leader." Cornelia always supported her sons Tiberius and Gaius, even when their actions outraged the conservative patrician families in which she was born. She took a lot of pride in them, comparing her children to "jewels" and other precious things, according to Valerius Maximus.

After their violent deaths, she retired from Rome to a villa in Misenum but continued to receive guests. Her villa saw the likes of many learned men, including Greek scholars, who came from all over the Roman world to read and discuss their ideas freely. Rome worshipped her virtues, and when she died at an advanced age, the city voted for a statue in her honor.

== Role in the political careers of her children ==
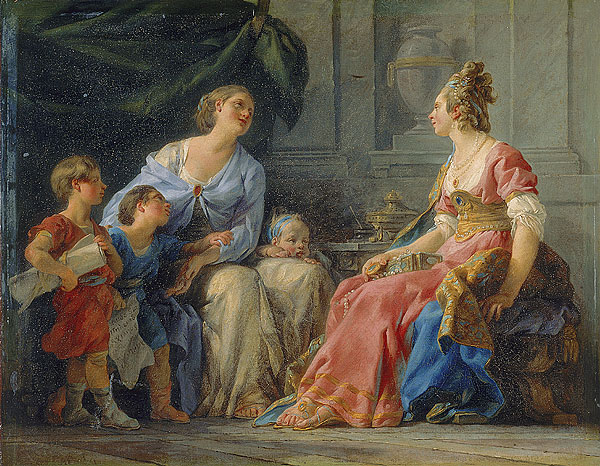
Cornelia, mother of the Gracchi, by Noël Hallé (1779, Musée Fabre)

M. I. Finley advances the argument that "the exclusion of women from any direct participation in political or governmental activity" was a normal practice in Ancient Roman society. Therefore, it is extremely difficult to characterize the extent of Cornelia's involvement in the political careers of her children, yet there is important evidence to support the fact that she was, at the very least, engaged.

A common social practice in Rome was extending the political line of a family through dynastic marriages, especially when two families were rising to power at about the same time. The marriage of Sempronia (Cornelia's daughter) to her cousin reaffirmed the continuation of the great Scipio lineage, seeing as though the legacy of Scipio Africanus had to be continued somehow. Scipio Aemilianus saw important growth in his political prestige as a result of this marriage, although not enough to compare to his brothers-in-law and their revolutionary political reforms.

One of the most important aspects of the life of Cornelia is her relationship with her adult sons. Most of the information that we have on her role during this time is what Plutarch wrote in both the Life of Tiberius Gracchus and the Life of Gaius Gracchus. She is portrayed as active during their political careers, especially during Gaius’.

Plutarch writes of how Gaius removed a law that disgraced Marcus Octavius, the tribune whom Tiberius had deposed, because Cornelia asked him to remove it. Plutarch states that the people all approved of this out of respect for her (due to her sons and her father). Plutarch also writes that Cornelia may have helped Gaius undermine the power of the consul Lucius Opimius by hiring foreign harvesters to help provide resistance (which suggests that harvesters were supporters of the Gracchi). Plutarch also writes that, when one of Gaius's political opponents attacked Cornelia, Gaius retorted:

"What," said he, "dost thou abuse Cornelia, who gave birth to Tiberius?" And since the one who had uttered the abuse was charged with effeminate practices, "With what effrontery," said Gaius, "canst thou compare thyself with Cornelia? Hast thou borne such children as she did? And verily all Rome knows that she refrained from commerce with men longer than thou hast, though thou art a man."

== Cornelia's letter excerpts ==
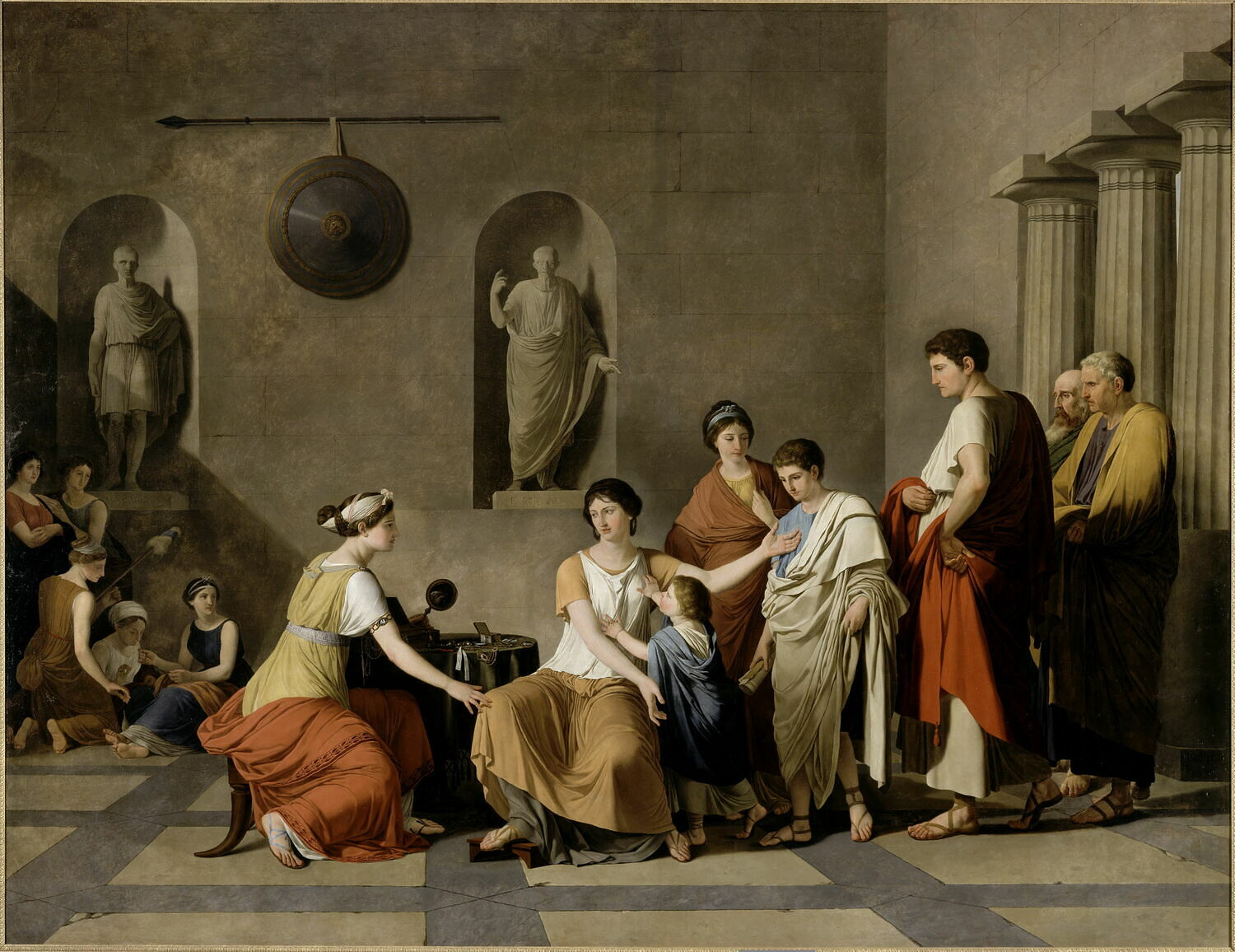
Cornelia, mother of the Gracchi, by Joseph-Benoît Suvée (1795, Louvre)

The manuscripts of Cornelius Nepos, the earliest Latin biographer (ca. 110–24 BC), include several excerpts from a letter supposedly composed by Cornelia to Gaius (her younger son). If the letters are authentic, they would make Cornelia one of many Roman women whose writings survive to the present day, and they would show how Roman women wielded considerable influence in political families. Additionally, this would make Cornelia the first woman in her own family who wrote and passed down the importance of writing to her posterity. The letters may be dated to just before Gaius' tribunate in 122 BC (Gaius would be killed the following year in 121 BC, over a decade after the death of his brother Tiberius in 133 BC). The wording in the letter is very interesting, insomuch as it uses the first person, is very assertive and displays copious amounts of raw emotion, which may have been new and unusual for a woman writing at that time, particularly to a man of such important social standing. The two excerpts read as follows:

"You will say that it is a beautiful thing to take on vengeance on enemies. To no one does this seem either greater or more beautiful than it does to me, but only if it is possible to pursue these aims without harming our country. But seeing as that cannot be done, our enemies will not perish for a long time and for many reasons, and they will be as they are now rather than have our country be destroyed and perish.

...

I would dare to take an oath solemnly, swearing that, except for those who have murdered Tiberius Gracchus, no enemy has foisted so much difficulty and so much distress upon me as you have because of the matters: you should have shouldered the responsibilities of all of those children whom I had in the past, and to make sure that I might have the least anxiety possible in my old age; and that, whatever you did, you would wish to please me most greatly; and that you would consider it sacrilegious to do anything of great significance contrary to my feelings, especially as I am someone with only a short portion of my life left. Cannot even that time span, as brief as it is, be of help in keeping you from opposing me and destroying our country? In the final analysis, what end will there be? When will our family stop behaving insanely? When will we cease insisting on troubles, both suffering and causing them? When will we begin to feel shame about disrupting and disturbing our country? But if this is altogether unable to take place, seek the office of tribune when I will be dead; as far as I am concerned, do what will please you, when I shall not perceive what you are doing. When I have died, you will sacrifice to me as a parent and call upon the god of your parent. At that time does it not shame you to seek prayers of those gods, whom you considered abandoned and deserted when they were alive and on hand? May Jupiter not for a single instant allow you to continue in these actions nor permit such madness to come into your mind. And if you persist, I fear that, by your own fault, you may incur such trouble for your entire life that at no time would you be able to make yourself happy."

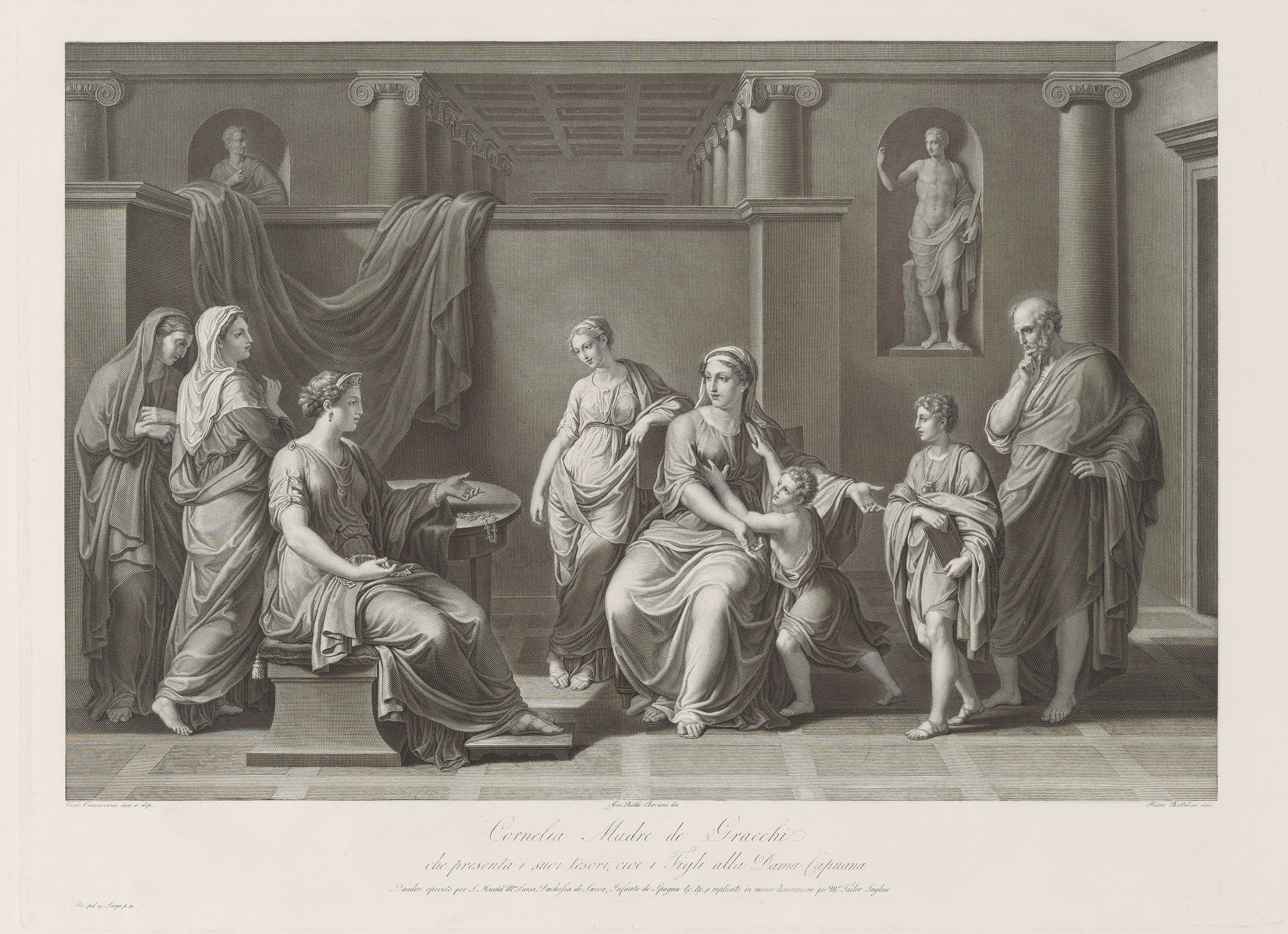
Engraving after Vincenzo Camuccini, Cornelia, Mother of the Gracchi, Presents Her Children to a Capuana Woman, 1870/1909

In the early 40s BC, Cicero, Nepos's contemporary, referenced Cornelia's letters. Cicero portrayed his friend Atticus as arguing for the influence of mothers on children's speech by noting that the letters' style appeared to Atticus to show that the Gracchi were heavily influenced by Cornelia's speech more than by her rearing. Later in history, Marcus Fabius Quintilian (ca. 35–ca. 100) would reassert Atticus's view of Cornelia's letters when he said "we have heard that their mother Cornelia had contributed greatly to the eloquence of the Gracchi, a woman whose extremely learned speech also has been handed down to future generations in her letters" (Inst. Orat. 1.1.6).4

While Cicero's reference to Cornelia's letters make it clear that elite Romans of the time period were familiar with Cornelia's writings, today's historians are divided about whether today's surviving fragments are authentically Cornelia's words. Instead, the fragments are likely to have been propaganda circulated by the elite optimate faction of Roman politics, who were opposed to the populist reforms of Cornelia's sons. The letters appear to present Cornelia (a woman with considerable cultural cachet) as opposed to her son's reforms, and Gaius as a rash radical detached from either the well-being of the Roman Republic or the wishes of his respected mother—meaning that the surviving fragments could either be outright contemporary forgeries or significantly altered versions of what Cornelia actually wrote.

== The Cornelia statue ==
Inscribed statue base of Cornelia, late 1st century BC–early 1st century AD

After her death, a statue of Cornelia was erected in Rome. It was "the first likeness of a secular Roman woman set up by her contemporaries in a public space." Her statue endured through the revolutionary reign of Sulla, and she became a model for future Roman women culminating with the portrait said to be of Helena, Emperor Constantine's mother, four hundred years later. Later, a conservative reaction caused the reference to her sons to be filed away and replaced with a reference to her father Africanus. The inscribed base has survived and is now in the Capitoline Museums in Rome.

== Changing legacy over time ==
The historical Cornelia remains somewhat elusive. The figure portrayed in Roman literature likely represents more what she signified to Roman writers than an objective account. This significance changed over time as Roman society evolved, in particular the role of women. The problems in interpreting the literature are compounded by the fact only one work allegedly attributed to Cornelia herself survives, and classicists have questioned its authenticity since the nineteenth century. The Cornelia Fragments, detailed above, purport to constitute what remains of a letter written in 124 BC to her son, Gaius, and were preserved later in the manuscripts of Cornelius Nepos, who wrote on the Gracchi. In the letter, Cornelia expresses strong opposition to Gaius’ intentions to stand for the tribunate. She also urges him not to continue the revolutionary policies of his older brother Tiberius Gracchus, which led ultimately to his death. The fragments were likely included in Nepos’ Life of Gaius Gracchus, now lost.

Controversy over the Fragments’ authenticity has focused on the letter’s style and content. While a consensus seems to agree that the fragments do resemble the writing style and language of an educated Roman aristocrat of the late second century BC, several observe Cornelia’s rebuking of Gaius’ policies in the letter seems to conflict what is understood about her positions preserved in other sources. The vehemence with which she addresses Gaius seems to conflict, to some scholars, with what is believed regarding her maternal devotion. Because of these doubts, some scholars hypothesize the Fragments constitute either a later forgery created by someone wishing to separate Cornelia's political ideologies from those of her sons, while others suggest they are a much later fabrication, representing a "rhetorical exercise" wherein the writer attempted to recreate what Cornelia might have said, and the letter was inadvertently included as legitimate source material in Aemilius Probus’ edition of Nepos’ works in the 5th century AD. These theories themselves prove problematic, as the letter constitutes only one data point, and are therefore insufficient in reconstructing broad conclusions about Cornelia's political ideals or making inferences about nebulous ideas of "maternal devotion." As has also been pointed out, if they do in fact represent the work of a forger, he was an expert in the grammar, language, and writing style of the late 2nd century Roman elite. A majority seems to believe that the Fragments are authentic and represent a private letter written by a highly educated woman, who never intended her stern rebuke to be read by anyone but her son.

With the Fragments being the only primary source material produced by Cornelia that survive, the reconstruction of the historical Cornelia relies mainly on how later Roman writers saw her. This is problematic because Roman depictions of Cornelia clearly change over time. The earliest image of Cornelia, painted largely by Plutarch's views, is of an aristocratic woman, spending much of her time living extravagantly in her family's villa, who because of her family's wealth, opportunities, and interest in education (particularly Greek), receives the best-possible education in Latin and Greek rhetoric. She is somewhat controversial, both for her sons’ political policies and for having developed (and frequently making use of) such strong rhetorical abilities, despite being a woman. These early accounts emphasize her education and abilities but place comparatively much less emphasis on her maternal role.

Over subsequent centuries Cornelia evolved in the eyes of Roman writers, and her memory was adapted to fit their agendas. Her educational achievement and abilities were de-emphasized in favor of her example of "idealized maternity." Her education was incorporated into her role as mother: education in order to pass it on to her sons. She was excised from the political controversy that surrounded her family and transformed into a heroic figure. As historian Emily Hemelrijk concludes, "the Cornelia we know is to a high degree a creation of later times."

== Modern representations ==
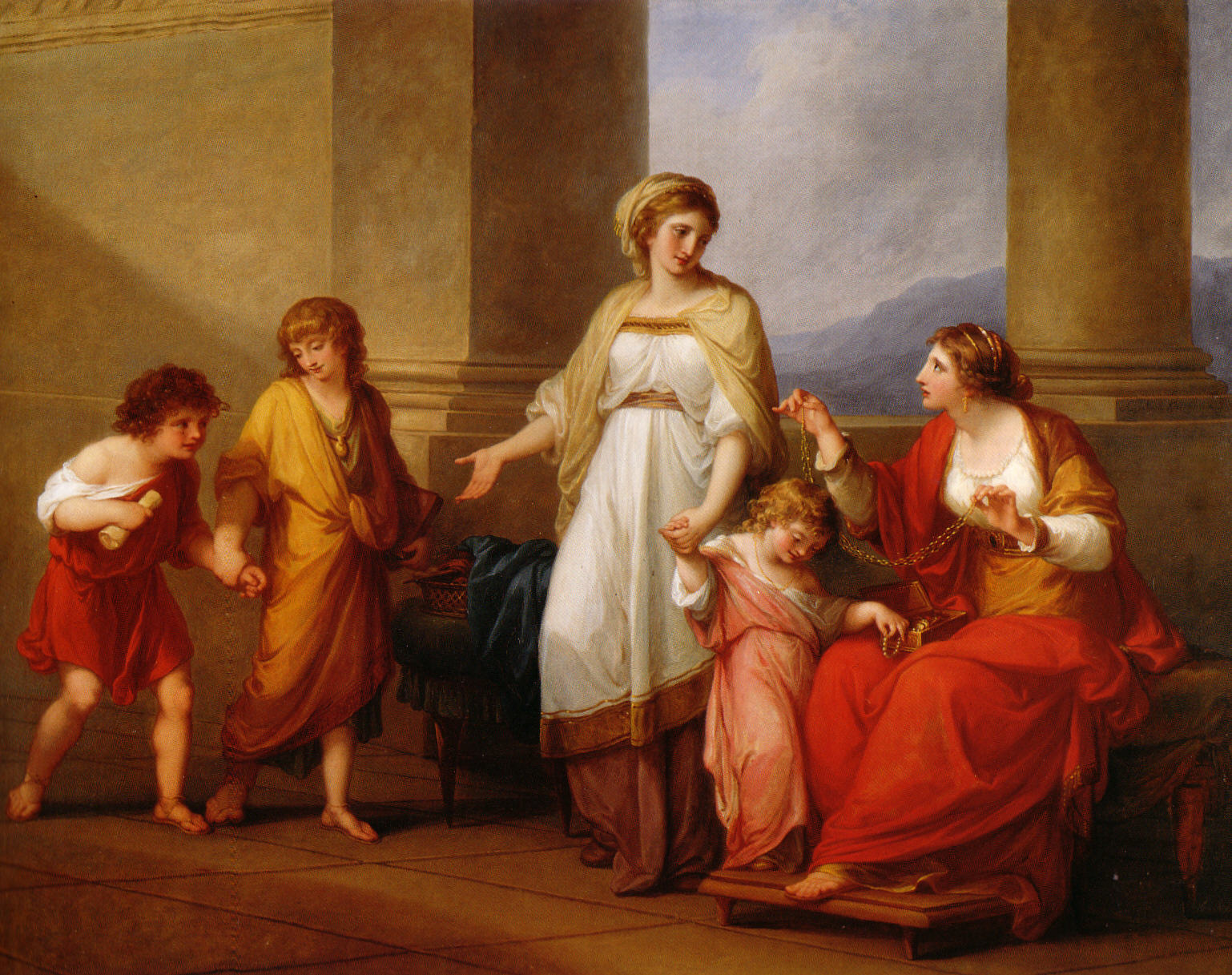
Cornelia, Mother of the Gracchi (1785) by Angelica Kauffman

An anecdote related by Valerius Maximus in his Factorum ac dictorum memorabilium libri IX (IV, 4, incipit) demonstrates Cornelia's devotion to and admiration for her sons. When women friends questioned Cornelia about her mode of dress and personal adornment, which was far more simple and understated than was usual for a wealthy Roman woman of her rank and station, Cornelia indicated her two sons and said, haec ornamenta mea [sunt], i.e., "These are my jewels."

Cornelia also serves as the feminine personification of the State of Ohio. A prominent statue of her, carrying her iconic phrase "These are my jewels," has stood on the grounds of the Ohio Statehouse for most of its history. This installation, which is often simply called Ohio's Jewels, was completed by Levi Scofield in 1894 and features the Roman matron standing alone on an elevated platform gesturing to the seven men who occupy less conspicuous areas around her feet. Each man possesses a deep connection to the State and its essential service in the Civil War on behalf of the Union. Collectively, these men are the subject of her affectionate comment. The statue was first displayed at the World's Columbian Exposition, an event whose own name paid homage to the popular personification of the United States.

Cornelia, as "Cornelia Gracchi," is also gilded on the Heritage Floor of Judy Chicago's iconic feminist artwork, The Dinner Party (1974–1979).

== See also ==
- Women in Rome
- Scipio-Paullus-Gracchus family tree
