= Quintus Fabius Maximus (consul 213 BC) =

Roman consul in 213 BC

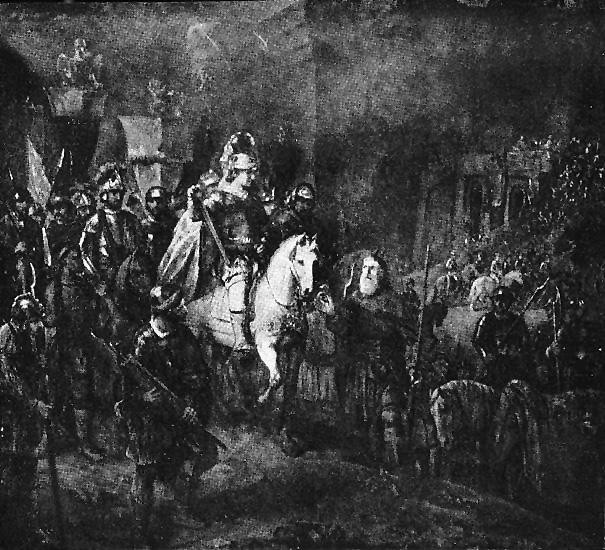
Quintus Fabius Maximus

Quintus Fabius Maximus was a consul of the Roman Republic in 213 BC. He was the son of Quintus Fabius Maximus Verrucosus, the famous dictator who invented Fabian strategy, and served with his father during the Second Punic War.

The younger Fabius was a military tribune in 216 BC, and was among the survivors of the Battle of Cannae who ended up at Canusium. In 215, he was curule aedile. As praetor in 214, he commanded two legions with which he captured Acuca in Luceria as well as a fortified camp near Ardoneae.

As consul for the following year, he took over his father's command of the army in Apulia and recaptured Arpi. He seems to have remained in Arpi with a few troops as a legatus, a legate or lieutenant, in 212 BC. In 209–208, he was serving still or again as a legatus during his father's fifth consulship. The elder Fabius sent him to recover the survivors of the army under Gnaeus Fulvius Centumalus, who had been killed in a surprise attack by Hannibal in 210. They accompanied him to Sicily, where Fabius took over the legions and fleet assigned to the proconsul Marcus Valerius Laevinus. In 208, he was sent by the Roman Senate to the army at Venusia. He may have been the envoy of the consul Marcus Livius Salinator in 207 who reported to the senate that it was safe to withdraw the consular army from Cisalpine Gaul.

Political offices
Preceded by Quintus Fabius Maximus Verrucosus, and Marcus Claudius Marcellus	Consul of the Roman Republic; 213 BC with Tiberius Sempronius Gracchus	Succeeded by Quintus Fulvius Flaccus, and Appius Claudius Pulcher
