= Sempronius Asellio =

Sempronius Asellio (flourished c. 158 BC – c. 91 BC) was an early Roman historian and one of the first writers of historiographic work in Latin. He was a military tribune of P. Scipio Aemilianus Africanus at the siege of Numantia in Hispania in 134 BC. Later he joined the circle of writers centred on Scipio Aemilianus. Asellio wrote the history of the events in which he was engaged, and thus preceded Caesar in his more famous accounts of his military campaigns.

== Life ==
Asellio, whose background is unknown, probably belonged to the prestigious plebeian gens Sempronia. He was greatly influenced by his co-writer Polybius, who was supported by Scipio Aemilianus. Polybius attempted not only to record events as they took place, but also to look for the causes that led to them. Asellio was the first Roman historian to follow this method. In his work, he showed contempt for the previous Roman historians of the annalistic school. According to him, they wrote nothing else than a diary as far as form was concerned.

== Work ==
Sempronius Asellio composed the Rerum Gestarum Libri (Latin for "Books of Things Done"), also referenced as the Libri Rerum Gestarum or Historiae ("History"). It comprised at least fourteen books and dealt mostly with the events of the Third Punic War (149 BC - 146 BC). It is also possible his work was a continuation of Polybius, whose own history stopped at 146 BC. Asellio's work covered events as late as 91 BC or even 83 BC.

Cicero did not think highly of Asellio's work and spoke disparagingly of its simple style. Nothing, apart from 15 citations preserved by later authors (Aulus Gellius and some grammarians), survives of his work.

== See also ==
- Sempronia gens
- Cato the Elder
