= Tiberius Sempronius Gracchus (consul 215 BC) =

Ancient Roman general and statesman

- Died: 212 BC; Southern Italy
- Cause of death: Killed in ambush
- Occupations: Politician and soldier
- Office: Curule aedile (216 BC); Magister equitum (216 BC); Consul (215, 213 BC)
- Father: Tiberius Sempronius Gracchus
- Relatives: Publius Sempronius Gracchus
- Military career
- Rank: Magister equitum, consul, proconsul
- Wars: Second Punic War

Tiberius Sempronius Gracchus (died 212 BC) was a Roman republican consul in the Second Punic War. He was son of the Tiberius Sempronius Gracchus who was consul in 238 BC, who was apparently the first man from his branch of the family to become a consul.

== Political and military career ==
Gracchus is first mentioned in 216 BC as a curule aedile.

After the defeat of the Roman army at Cannae, he was made magister equitum in the dictatorship of Marcus Junius Pera, who was tasked with reorganising the army and recruiting new troops. With the legions barely formed, Gracchus and Pera made camp near Casilinum; when the dictator had to return to Rome, Gracchus held the command with the understanding that he would not attempt any sortie against the enemy, even when Hannibal besieged the city and began to starve the population. To give some relief to the besieged inhabitants, Gracchus sent numerous chests of food along the Volturnus three nights in a row; as the river ran into the city, the inhabitants were easily able to recover the chests of food. However, on the fourth night a strong wind drove the chests towards the Carthaginian army who thereafter closely watched the river and prevented the transport of any further food into the city.

He was elected consul to serve for 215 BC, at the recommendation of the dictator whose orders he had faithfully obeyed even when obliged to abandon Italian allies to their fate. His colleague-elect Lucius Postumius Albinus was killed in an ambush in Gaul on his way home. Marcus Claudius Marcellus was elected suffect consul, but his election was declared invalid by the augurs, who forced him to resign. The invalidity was supposedly the result of patrician agitation, claiming that two plebeians could not serve as consuls together. Quintus Fabius Maximus Verrucosus was then elected suffect consul to serve out the year. During his consulship, Gracchus raised forces and took his forces to garrison Campania and the city of Cumae after conducting the elections for both suffect consuls.

During his first consulship, Fabius and the senate decided to enlist slave volunteers into the Roman army in separate legions in return for their freedom. Gracchus was appointed commander of the slave troops. He rapidly became known as an effective general of the volunteer slaves, winning their loyalty and trust for his clemency when some broke and ran from the field.

Gracchus was prorogued pro consule into 214 BC, continuing to lead his slave and freedmen troops. His slave forces captured Cumae and Philip V of Macedon's envoys to Hannibal. After preventing Hanno (Hannibal's nephew) from reinforcing Hannibal's forces in Italy, the slaves were freed for their services.

He was re-elected consul for 213 BC with Fabius Maximus again as his colleague. While Fabius led his army to Apulia, Gracchus fought some lesser campaigns in Lucania. During this consulship, he appointed Gaius Claudius Centho as dictator to oversee consular elections and commanded near Luceria in northern Italy.

=== Death ===
In 212 BC, while proconsul in Lucania, Gracchus was ordered to bring troops to reinforce Beneventum and en route he and his men were ambushed and killed: a Roman ally defected while leading Gracchus to a place where the Carthaginian commander Mago Barca was waiting in ambush. Hannibal gave the dead general full funeral rites and returned his bones to his soldiers for burial.

== Family ==
His wife is unknown, but he had at least one son. This Gracchus's son, Tiberius Sempronius Gracchus, became a priest in 203 BC and died, while an augur, in the plague in 174 BC. His brother Publius Sempronius Gracchus was the father of the Tiberius Sempronius Gracchus who was consul in 177 BC, whose sons Tiberius Gracchus and Gaius Gracchus were the famous reformers.

Political offices
Preceded by Gaius Terentius Varro; Lucius Aemilius Paullus	Roman consul 215 BC with Lucius Postumius Albinus	Succeeded by Q. Fabius Maximus Verrucosus; Marcus Claudius Marcellus
Preceded by Q. Fabius Maximus Verrucosus; Marcus Claudius Marcellus	Roman consul 213 BC with Quintus Fabius Maximus	Succeeded by Quintus Fulvius Flaccus; Appius Claudius Pulcher
