= Marcus Sempronius Tuditanus (consul 185 BC) =

Roman consul 185 BC

Marcus Sempronius Tuditanus was a Roman politician in the second century BC.

== Career ==
Sempronius Tuditanus was elected tribune of the plebs in 193 BC. In 189 BC, he served as praetor and administered the Province of Sicily. In 185 BC, he was elected consul together with Appius Claudius Pulcher as his colleague. Both consuls fought in Liguria, defeating the Ingauni. In 183 BC, he was named pontiff. In 174 BC, he died of plague.
