= Sempronia (sister of the Gracchi) =

Roman noblewoman

- Born: Rome
- Died: Rome
- Spouse: Scipio Aemilianus

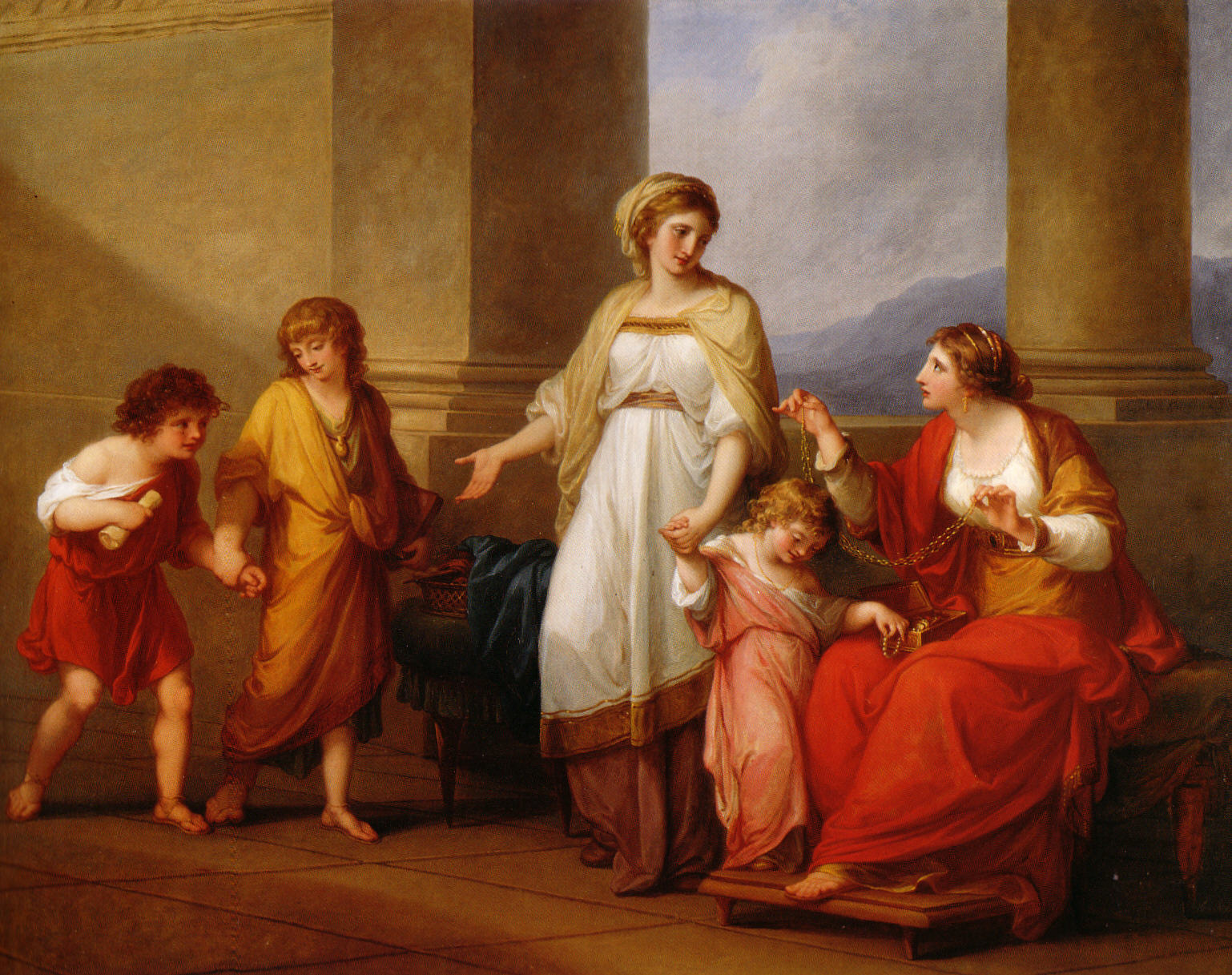
A young Sempronia (in pink) holds the hand of her mother Cornelia (in white). Cornelia, Mother of the Gracchi, Pointing to her Children as Her Treasures, by Angelica Kauffmann (1785, Virginia Museum of Fine Arts)

Sempronia (170 BC – after 101 BC) was a Roman noblewoman living in the Middle and Late Roman Republic, who was most famous as the sister of the ill-fated Tiberius Gracchus (died 133 BC) and Gaius Gracchus (died 121 BC), and the wife of a Roman general Scipio Aemilianus.

== Background ==
Sempronia was the oldest surviving child and only surviving daughter of Roman consul and censor Tiberius Sempronius Gracchus and his wife Cornelia. Her younger brothers were the famed Roman politicians Tiberius Gracchus and Gaius Gracchus. Her maternal grandparents were the great Roman general Scipio Africanus and his wife Aemilia Paulla; Sempronia's maternal great-uncle was another distinguished Roman general, Lucius Aemilius Paulus Macedonicus. Her father had a formidable reputation as a general (having won a triumph in Sardinia), and was known as a strict censor who was nonetheless tremendously popular.

Sempronia was born in Rome around 170 BC, and was raised and educated there by her mother. Her father died suddenly in 154 BC, however it is probable that she was engaged while he was still alive. Her mother's maternal first cousin, Scipio Aemilianus Africanus, was her first cousin by adoption (by her maternal uncle) as well as her betrothed. Upon her father's death, her younger brothers were apparently partly raised and educated in Scipio's household; he was wealthy, rich, and cultivated a circle of literary-minded Romans and foreigners known to history as the Scipionic Circle. When Sempronia was age 17 or 18, probably around 151 BC (when Scipio the Younger left for Spain), she appears to have married Scipio Aemilianus. He would later become a famous Roman general and a somewhat less successful Roman politician.

== Marriage ==
Certain historical accounts state that Sempronia and Scipio had a very unhappy marriage. They did not show any affection towards each other, and Scipio complained of her lack of beauty and sterility. It is known that Sempronia had no children in her marriage. Those same historical accounts state that the couple disagreed over Scipio's treatment of his young cousin and former ward Tiberius Gracchus, who had tried to arrange a settlement for Numantia and bring an entire Roman army out of captivity. Scipio denounced the treaty in the Senate, and although Gracchus was saved from punishment, he bore a grudge against Scipio and his allies henceforth. He allied himself with Scipio's political rival Appius Claudius Pulcher, who was Princeps Senatus and censor in 136 BC, as well as other influential men allied to him by marriage. He then became tribune of the plebs in order to implement a radical reform program that threatened to undermine the socio-economic and political order.

In 133 BC, Tiberius Gracchus and some of his followers were clubbed to death in Rome. The conservative mob which attacked them was led by a close relative, Sempronia and Scipio's cousin Publius Cornelius Scipio Nasica Serapio, who was Pontifex Maximus. At the time, Scipio was away in Spain successfully besieging Numantia, and, on his return, is said to have commented that Tiberius had tried to make himself king of Rome, and thus implied that Gracchus's death was justified by the mos maiorum. At the time, Scipio was credited for having arranged the murder, or at the very least, having connived at it.

Scipio was held indirectly responsible for his brother-in-law's death, or at least, for his failure to prosecute those responsible for the murder of Roman citizens in the vicinity of the Senate. This, together with his want of tact in speaking to the people henceforth, led to a drop in his popularity among the Roman voters. However, he was still an influential and effective speaker in the Senate.

Around that same time, some translations assert that Scipio had made a comparison between himself and Tiberius Gracchus to Agamemnon and Aegisthus, respectively. The public at the time would have been able to extrapolate this comparison to come to the conclusion that Tiberius Gracchus and his sister Sempronia had shared an adulterous and incestuous relationship. While there is no evidence to support this rumor, it is possible it influenced the later scandal between Sempronia and Lucius Equitus.

== Death of Scipio Aemilianus ==
In 129 BC, Scipio told allies of Gracchus, notably the tribune Gaius Papirius Carbo, that he intended to formally denounce Tiberius Gracchus' reforms, notably the agrarian proposals. Carbo, then a tribune of the plebs, had been a long-time supporter of Tiberius Gracchus, and at that time he was a bitter enemy of Scipio. Scipio returned home and went to bed early, planning to make his crucial speech the next day in the Senate. The following morning, he was found dead in his bed.

There had been no history of illness. His body was hastily cremated, rather than interred as customary among the Scipios. (Note: The family had a tomb, rediscovered in the eighteenth century, and now in the Vatican.) Rumours spread that he was murdered, and his estranged wife Sempronia and her mother Cornelia Africana were suspected. However, the cause of Scipio's death is unknown, and there is no evidence to prove that Sempronia was involved. However, the response of the Senate to the sudden death of a great general was unusual.

Modern scholars suggest that if Scipio was murdered, it was probably Carbo who was responsible. The Roman historian and senator Cicero, writing several decades later using sources who were close to the late Scipio, named Carbo as the guilty party, but was less certain as to whether Sempronia gave Carbo access to Scipio. Those believing that Scipio was murdered point to the similar mysterious death of another cousin Publius Cornelius Scipio Nasica Serapio who, even though Pontifex Maximus, had been sent off to Asia Minor by the Senate, and died mysteriously in Pergamum in 132 BC.

== Later years ==
Sempronia lived quietly after her husband's death with her mother. After her younger brother also died in 121 BC, Sempronia's mother Cornelia died later that year, leaving her property by special exemption to her infant granddaughter.

Years after the death of Sempronia's husband Scipio, she was embroiled in another public scandal. Around 100 BC, one Roman politician quickly gained a reputation by claiming to be the bastard son of Sempronia's brother, Tiberius Gracchus. This Roman politician was named Lucius Equitius. It is possible that this scandal was influenced by the prior rumor that Sempronia and her brother had shared an incestuous relationship while Scipio was still alive, implying that Equitius was the result of this union.

Regardless of whether the rumor of incest had taken hold, one tribune did seek confirmation from Sempronia that Lucius Equitius was indeed the direct descendant of her brother. It was demanded that Sempronia kiss Lucius Equitius in the Forum to provide proof of his claim as only surviving child of Tiberius Gracchus. The general public was elated at the prospect of Tiberius Gracchus having a surviving descendant, but Sempronia would not confirm the rumor, indignantly denying it. Now, it is widely accepted that Lucius Equitius was not related to the Gracchus family in any way.

== Cultural depictions ==
Sempronia is featured in the painting Cornelia, Mother of the Gracchi, Pointing to her Children as Her Treasures by Angelica Kaufmann, an eighteenth-century European artist. In this painting Sempronia is shown as a young girl, dressed in pink and holding her mother's hand, while her brothers (who in reality were seven and sixteen year younger than Sempronia, respectively) are shown as older. This is to demonstrate the innocence of Sempronia, and her connection to her mother, Cornelia.

== See also ==
- Sempronia gens

== Sources ==
- Sallust, De coniuratione Catilinae xxv
- Plutarch, Makers of Rome, Tiberius Gracchus.
- Valerius Maximus, Factorum et dictorum memorabilium libri iii.8.6, ix.15.1
