= Publius Cornelius Lentulus Caudinus =

Roman politician

Publius Cornelius Lentulus Caudinus was a Roman politician in the third century BC.

== Family ==
He was a member of gens Cornelia. His father was Lucius Cornelius Lentulus Caudinus, consul in 275 BC. His brother was Lucius Cornelius Lentulus Caudinus, consul in 237 BC. Publius had a son of the same name, who served as Praetor in 203 BC.

== Career ==
In 236 BC, Lentulus served as consul, together with Gaius Licinius Varus as his colleague. He fought successfully against the Ligurians, and celebrated a triumph upon defeating them.
