= Gaius Licinius Varus =

Roman politician

Gaius Licinius Varus was a Roman politician in the third century BC.

== Career ==
Licinius Varus was elected consul in 236 BC, together with Publius Cornelius Lentulus Caudinus as his colleague. The consuls marched to Ariminium, to fight against Gauls that had come over the Alps, but the Gauls had already scattered. Then Lentulus led his troops against the Ligurians, and Varus into Corsica. He did not approve of the peace treaty signed with the Corsi natives.
