= Lucius Porcius Licinus =

Roman consul 184 BC

Lucius Porcius Licinus was a Roman politician in the second century BC.

== Family ==
He was a member of the gens Porcia. His father of the same name served as praetor at the Battle of the Metaurus. His son was also named Lucius Porcius Licinus.

== Career ==
In 193 BC, he was elected praetor. The province he administered was Corsica and Sardinia. After having been in vain a candidate for consul several times, he was elected consul in 184 BC together with Publius Claudius Pulcher as his colleague. Both consuls waged war against the Ligurians, accomplishing not much of note. During the war, Licinus vowed to Venus that he would build her a temple, which his son (or brother) dedicated in Rome in 181 BC, the Temple of Venus Erycina at the Porta Collina.
