= Tiberius Gracchus =

Roman politician and social reformer (163 – 133 BC)

Tiberius Sempronius Gracchus
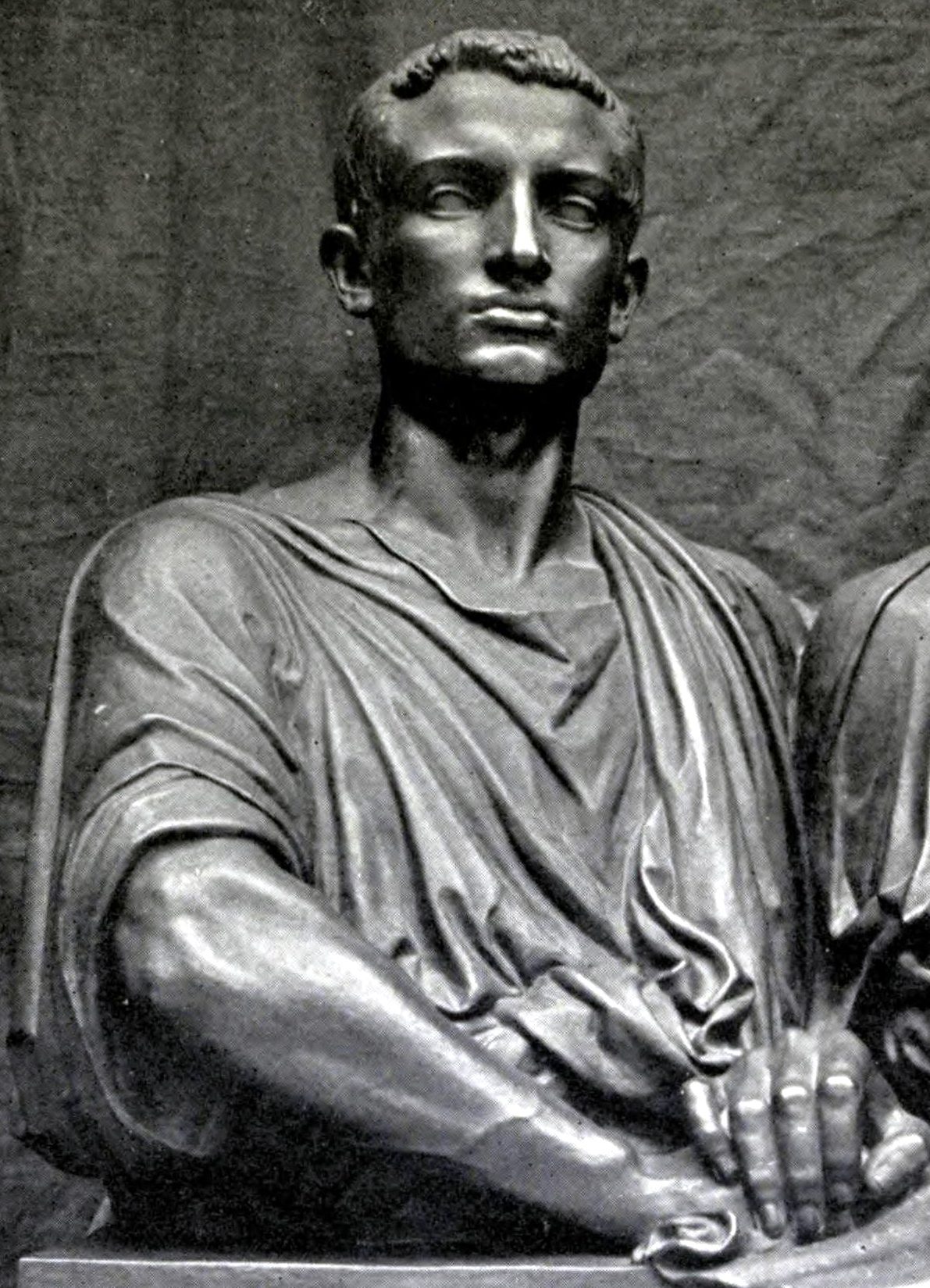
- A bust of Tiberius from a 19th century commemorative sculpture of the Gracchi brothers by Eugène Guillaume
- Born: c. 163 BC
- Died: 133 BC (probably aged 29); Rome
- Cause of death: Assassination
- Known for: Agrarian reforms
- Office: Quaestor (137 BC); Tribune of the plebs (133 BC)
- Parents: Tiberius Sempronius Gracchus; Cornelia
- Relatives: Gaius Gracchus (brother); Sempronia (sister); Scipio Nasica Serapio (cousin); Scipio Africanus (grandfather)
- Military career
- Rank: Military tribune and quaestor
- Wars: Third Punic War (146 BC); Numantine War (137 BC)

Tiberius Sempronius Gracchus (/ˈɡrækəs/; c. 163 – 133 BC) was a Roman politician best known for his agrarian reform law entailing the transfer of land from the Roman state and wealthy landowners to poorer citizens. He had also served in the Roman army, fighting in Africa during the Third Punic War and in Spain during the Numantine War.

His political future was imperilled during his quaestorship when he was forced to negotiate a humiliating treaty with the Numantines after they had surrounded the army he was part of in Spain. Seeking to rebuild that future and reacting to a supposed decline in the Roman population which he blamed on rich families buying up Italian land, he carried a land reform bill against strong opposition by another tribune during his term as tribune of the plebs in 133 BC. To pass and protect his reforms, Tiberius unprecedentedly had the tribune who opposed his programme deposed from office, usurped the senate's prerogatives over foreign policy, and attempted to stand for a consecutive tribunate. Fears of Tiberius' popularity and his willingness to break political norms led to his death, along with many supporters, in a riot instigated by his enemies.

His land reforms survived his death; family allies, including his younger brother Gaius, took places on the land commission set up by the law and distributed over 3,000 square kilometres (1,200 sq mi) of land over the next few years. A decade later, Gaius too was plebeian tribune and proposed in his year much more wide-ranging reforms that also led to his death. Tiberius and his brother Gaius are known collectively as the Gracchi brothers. The date of Tiberius' death marks the traditional start of the Roman Republic's decline and eventual collapse.

== Early life ==
Tiberius Sempronius Gracchus was born in 163 or 162 BC. He was, from birth, a member of the Roman Republic's aristocracy.

His father, also named Tiberius Sempronius Gracchus, was part of one of Rome's leading families. Tiberius' father served as consul for 177 and 163 BC, and was elected censor in 169. He also had celebrated two triumphs during the 170s, one for the victorious establishment of a twenty-year-long peace in Spain.

Tiberius' mother, Cornelia, was the daughter of the renowned general Scipio Africanus. His sister Sempronia was the wife of Scipio Aemilianus, another important general and politician. Tiberius was brought up by his mother, who dedicated herself after the elder Tiberius' death to her children's education. Prior to his military career, Tiberius was co-opted into the College of Augurs.

== Military career ==
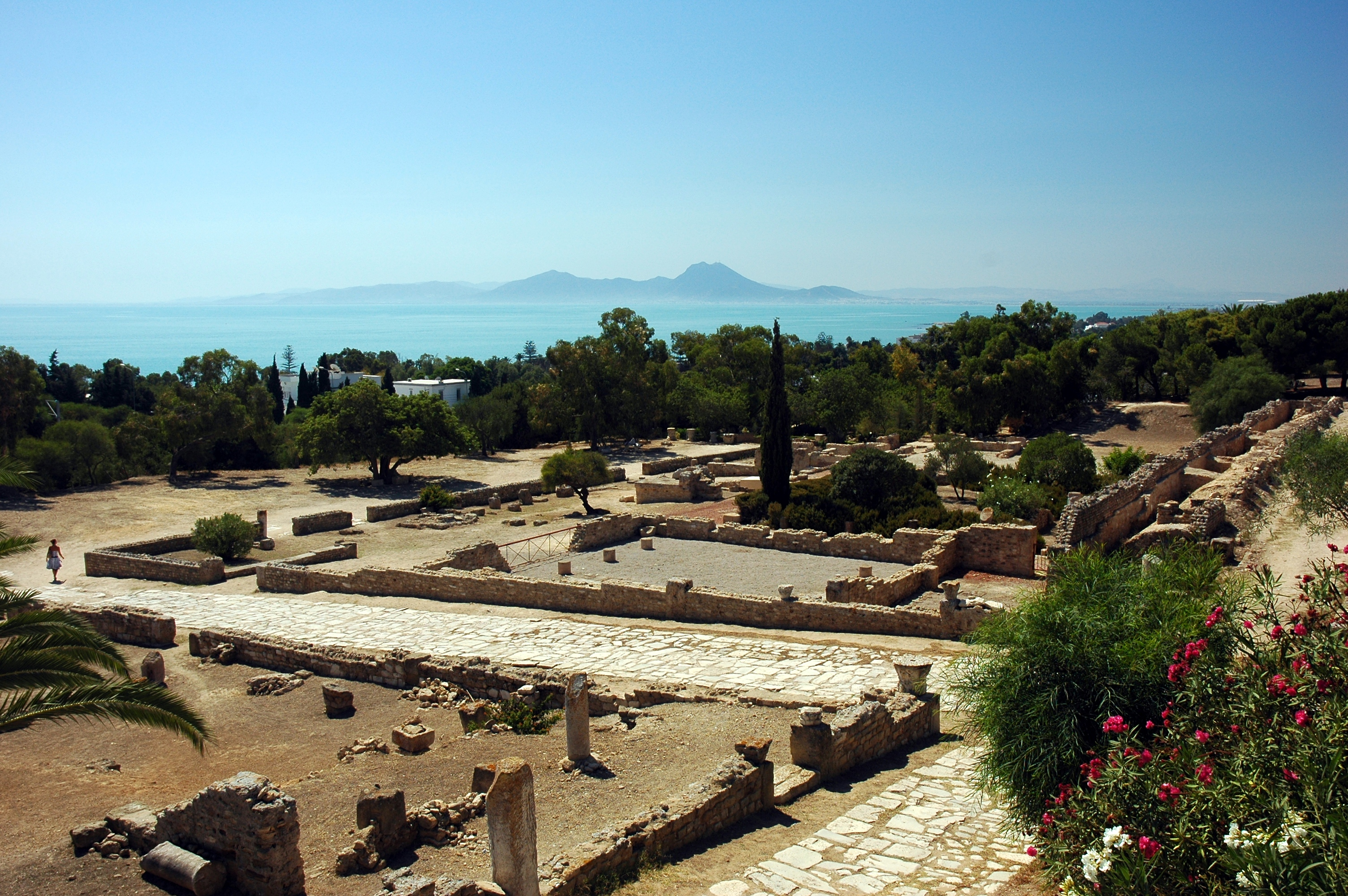
Ruins of Carthage in modern-day Tunisia. Tiberius served as an officer in the army under Scipio Aemilianus that razed the city during the Third Punic War.

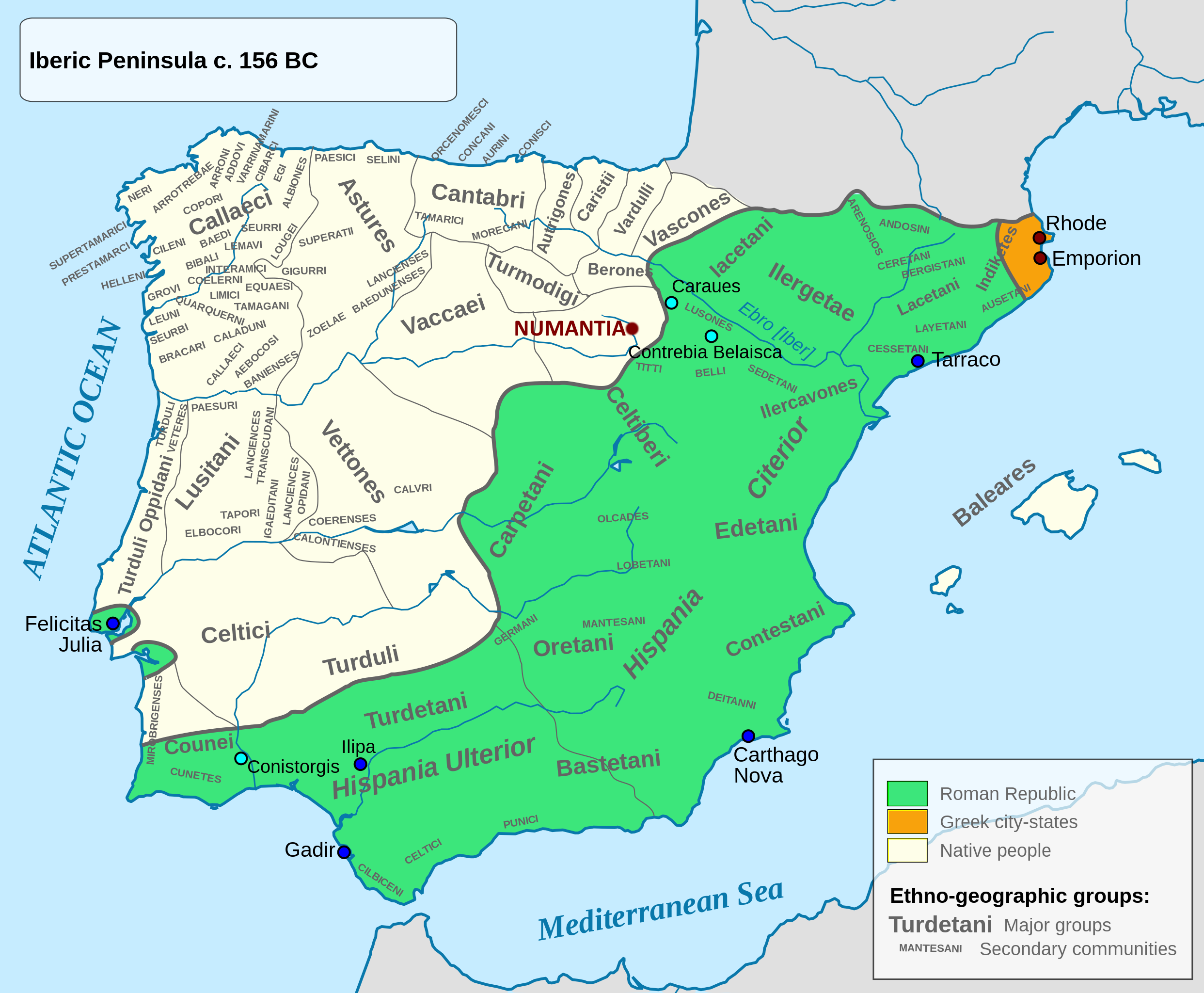
Rome expanded into Spain and came into conflict with Numantia in the middle of the 2nd century BC.

Tiberius began his military career in 147 BC, serving as a legate or military tribune under his brother-in-law, Scipio Aemilianus during his campaign to take Carthage during the Third Punic War. According to Plutarch, Tiberius – along with Gaius Fannius – was among the first to scale Carthage's walls. He served through to the next year.

In 137 BC he was quaestor to consul Gaius Hostilius Mancinus and served his term in Hispania Citerior (nearer Spain) during the Numantine War. The campaign was unsuccessful; Mancinus and his army lost several skirmishes outside the city before a confused retreat in the night led to the army being surrounded. Mancinus then sent Tiberius to negotiate a treaty of surrender.

The Numantines had previously signed a treaty with Rome a few years earlier under Quintus Pompeius, but Rome had reneged on its terms; the senate refused to ratify the treaty on the grounds that its terms were too favourable to the Numantines. Tiberius' negotiations were successful in part because of the influence with the Numantines he inherited from his father's praetorship in the area in 179–78 BC. During the negotiations, Tiberius requested the return of his quaestorian account books which were taken when the Numantines had captured the Roman camp; the Numantines acquiesced.

The new treaty brought back in defeat was also rejected: the Romans rejected the terms as humiliating, revoked Mancinus' citizenship, and sent him stripped and bound to the Numantines. However, by the time the terms of this agreement were being debated in the senate, Numantine ambassadors had also arrived and Mancinus likely argued in favour of his own ritual surrender, felt confident in his safety, and wanted to look towards making a soft landing for his career. Tiberius offered no forceful support for the treaty and seems to have distanced himself from it; it was proposed to send Tiberius in chains along with Mancinus, but that proposal was defeated.

== Tribunate ==
Roman land – the ager Romanus – around 133 BC. In red are public lands held prior to the Second Punic War. Those in yellow were acquired after victory over the southern Italian allies who defected during the conflict.

Tiberius was elected as plebeian tribune for 133 BC. While Livy's depiction of the middle republic as domestically placid is exaggerated, Roman political culture at the time generally resolved disputes through negotiation, peer pressure, and deference to established norms. Economic and demographic pressures among poorer Romans created substantial demand for redistribution of underexploited state land (ager publicus). Traditional accounts claimed that much of this land had been occupied by wealthy landowners operating large latifundia worked by slaves, which displaced poorer farmers.

Tiberius believed that a previous law had limited the amount of public land that any person could hold to approximately 120 hectares, which was largely ignored. Tiberius proposed the Lex Sempronia agraria to enforce this limit; surplus land would then be transferred into the hands of poor Roman citizens. This would benefit the poor, slow the rate of urbanisation and increase the amount of men with the necessary land to meet the army property qualifications.

The reforms gained strong support from the rural plebs, many of whom came to Rome to support Tiberius. Although there was strong opposition from many in the elite who held large amounts of public land, he did receive backing from other members of the elite, including the consul Publius Mucius Scaevola, his father-in-law Appius Claudius Pulcher, and Publius Licinius Crassus Dives Mucianus, along with several younger senators.

The bill was proposed before the concilium plebis; Tiberius forwent the approval of the senate before a bill was to be introduced. In response, the senate persuaded his fellow tribune Marcus Octavius, who may have previously been one of Tiberius' friends, to obstruct the proceedings through his veto. This led to the physical removal, and effective but unconstitutional removal, of Octavius as tribune.

Moreover, victory would win him considerable support among the people and buttressed his prospects for higher office. His refusals to compromise or withdraw his proposals led to suspicion among the elite that the bill was for his personal and familial political interests instead of his stated objectives. Indeed, the stubbornness with which he sought his objectives may have come from a personal need to secure his political future securing a big political success during his tribunician year. Moreover, Tiberius and his ally and father-in-law Appius Claudius Pulcher may have also calculated that land distributions would co-opt the loyalties of the soon-to-return Numantine war veterans. Passage would have served to balance against Aemilianus' political influence – he was the commander in the final campaign of the Numantine war – after his expected victory.

After passage of the bill, the senate allocated very little money for the commissioners, making it impossible for the commission to do its job when it needed to pay for surveyors, pack animals, and other expenses. After this meagre allotment, however, news arrived that Attalus III of Pergamum had died and that he had bequeathed his treasury and devised his kingdom to Rome. Tiberius proposed using the bequest to finance the land commission, which triggered a wave of opposition. The ancient sources disagree on what the bequest would be used for: Plutarch asserts it was to be used to buy tools for the farmers, Livy's epitome asserts it was to be used to purchase more land for redistribution in response to an apparent shortage. The latter is unlikely, as the process of surveying and distribution were incipient; it is also possible the money was to be used to finance the commission itself. Tiberius' proposal usurped senatorial prerogatives over finance and foreign policy, breaking a major political norm. The proposal to take the Attalid legacy led to Tiberius coming under attack in the senate by Quintus Pompeius and being accused of harbouring regal ambitions. One of the former consuls also brought a lawsuit against Tiberius arguing the deposition of Octavius violated magisterial collegiality and was a dangerous precedent which a sufficiently powerful tribune could exploit to bypass all checks on his power.

== Attempted re-election and death ==
He tried to stand for re-election as tribune, claiming that he needed to do so to prevent repeal of the agrarian law or possibly to escape prosecution for his deposition of Octavius. Attempts at such consecutive terms may have been illegal. The bid, however, certainly violated Roman constitutional norms: magistrates were immune while in office and continuous officeholding implied continual immunity. Some ancient historians also report that Tiberius, to smooth his bid for re-election, brought laws to create mixed juries of senators and equites but this likely emerges from confusion with his brother's law to that effect. The deadly opposition to Tiberius Gracchus' reforms focused more on his subsequent actions – interpreted by his contemporaries as indicative of a desire to essentially overthrow the republic and institute a popular tyranny – than on the reforms themselves.

At the electoral comitia for the plebeian tribunate of 132 BC, Tiberius and his entourage seized the Capitoline hill where the voting was taking place to dictate the result. At a senate meeting on the tribunician elections, Tiberius' first cousin Publius Cornelius Scipio Nasica Serapio, the pontifex maximus, attempted to induce consul Publius Mucius Scaevola use force and stop Tiberius' re-election. When Scaevola refused, Scipio Nasica shouted a formula for levying soldiers in an emergency – "anyone who wants the community secure, follow me" (Latin: qui rem publicam salvam esse volunt me sequatur) – and led a mob to the comitia with his toga drawn over his head. In doing so, he attempted to frame the killing as a religious rite (consacratio) taken to free the state from an incipient tyrant. Tiberius and supporters did not fight back; killed with stones, wooden chairs and other blunt weapons, their bodies were thrown into the Tiber.

== Aftermath of Tiberius' death ==
Map showing areas where Gracchan cippi have been found or are likely in consequence of Tiberius' lex Sempronia.

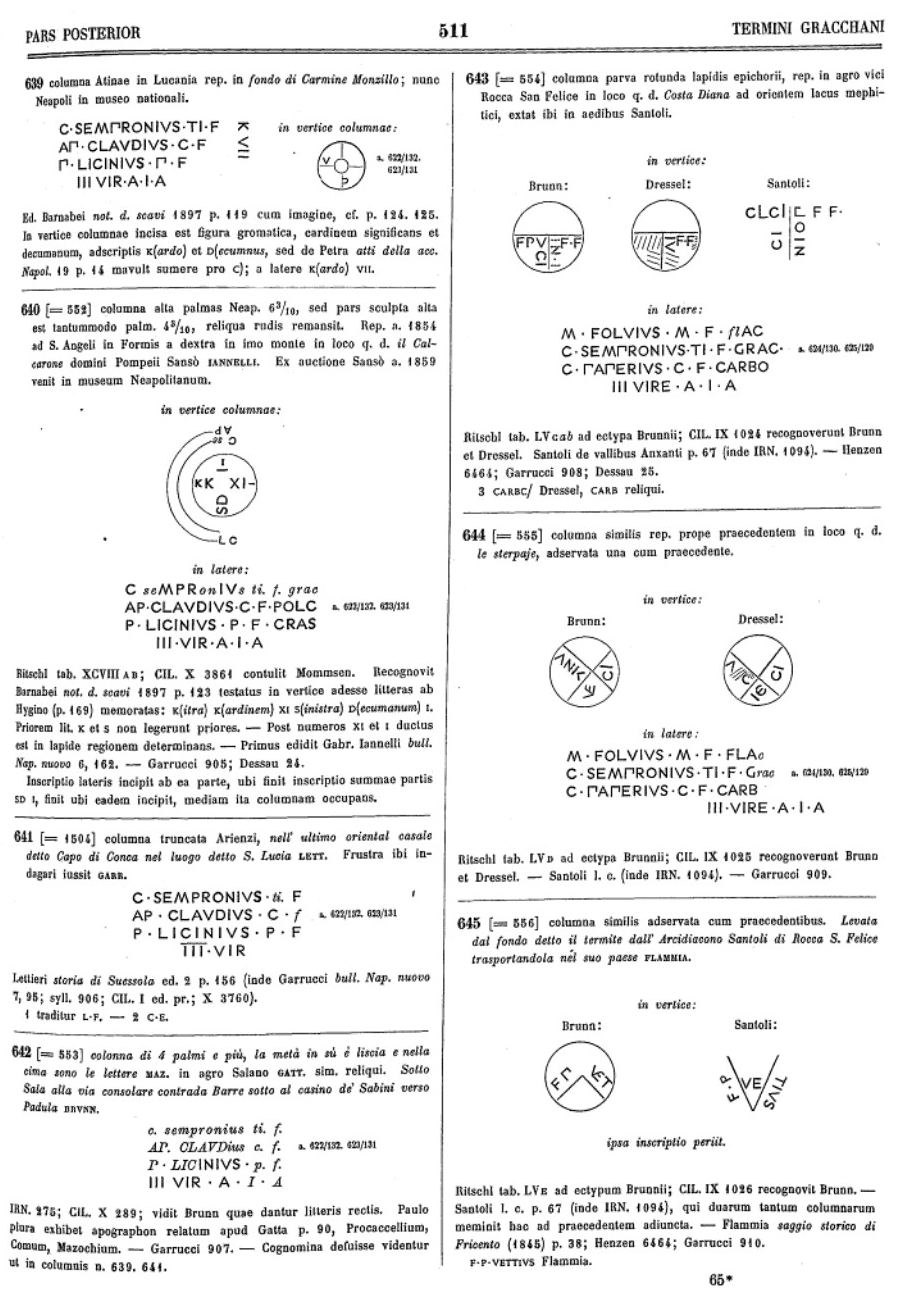
This page in the revised edition of the Corpus Inscriptionum Latinarum describes inscriptions documenting the work of Tiberius' land commission and its membership. His brother Gaius and father-in-law Appius Claudius Pulcher appear multiple times.

Tiberius' agrarian law was not repealed. His position on the agrarian commission was filled; the commission's business continued over the next few years: its progress can be observed in recovered boundary stones stating the commissioners' names. Most of those boundary stones bear the names of Gaius Gracchus, Appius Claudius Pulcher, and Publius Licinius Crassus. An increase in the register of citizens in the next decade suggests a large number of land allotments. But that registration could also be related to greater willingness to register: registration brought the chance of getting land from the commission. It also could have been related to lowering of the property qualifications for census registration into the fifth class from four thousand to 1.5 thousand asses.

The activities of the land commission started to slow after 129 BC. The senate pounced on complaints from Italian allies that the land commissioners were unfairly seizing land from Italians. Scipio Aemilianus, arguing on behalf of the Italians, convinced the state to move decisions on Italian land away from the land commissioners to the consuls; the consuls promptly did nothing, stalling the commission's ability to acquire new land to distribute. However, over the few years of the commission's most fruitful activities, the amount of land distributed was substantial: the Gracchan boundary stones are found all over southern Italy. They distributed some 1.3 million jugera (or 3,268 square kilometres), accommodating somewhere between 70,000 and 130,000 settlers. Shortly after this intervention, Scipio died mysteriously, leading to unsubstantiated rumours that his wife (also Tiberius Gracchus' sister), Gaius Gracchus, or other combinations of Gracchan allies had murdered him. These charges are not believed by modern historians.

Some Gracchan supporters were prosecuted in special courts established by the senate under the supervision of the consuls for 132 BC. The special court, however, was not some kind of political purge; it largely acted against politically unimportant people and non-citizens. Scipio Nasica, after being brought up on the charge of murdering Tiberius Gracchus, was sent on a convenient delegation to Pergamum, where he died the following year. The senate, in so doing, conveyed at least a tacit approval of Tiberius' murder.

== Personal life ==
Tiberius married Claudia, daughter of the Appius Claudius Pulcher who was consul in 143 BC. Appius was a major opponent of the Scipios, a family with which Tiberius was related in his maternal line. The date of the marriage is uncertain; it could have been related to a plan to reconcile the two families. His marriage to Pulcher's daughter, however, did cement an intergenerational friendship between their two families.

== Legacy ==
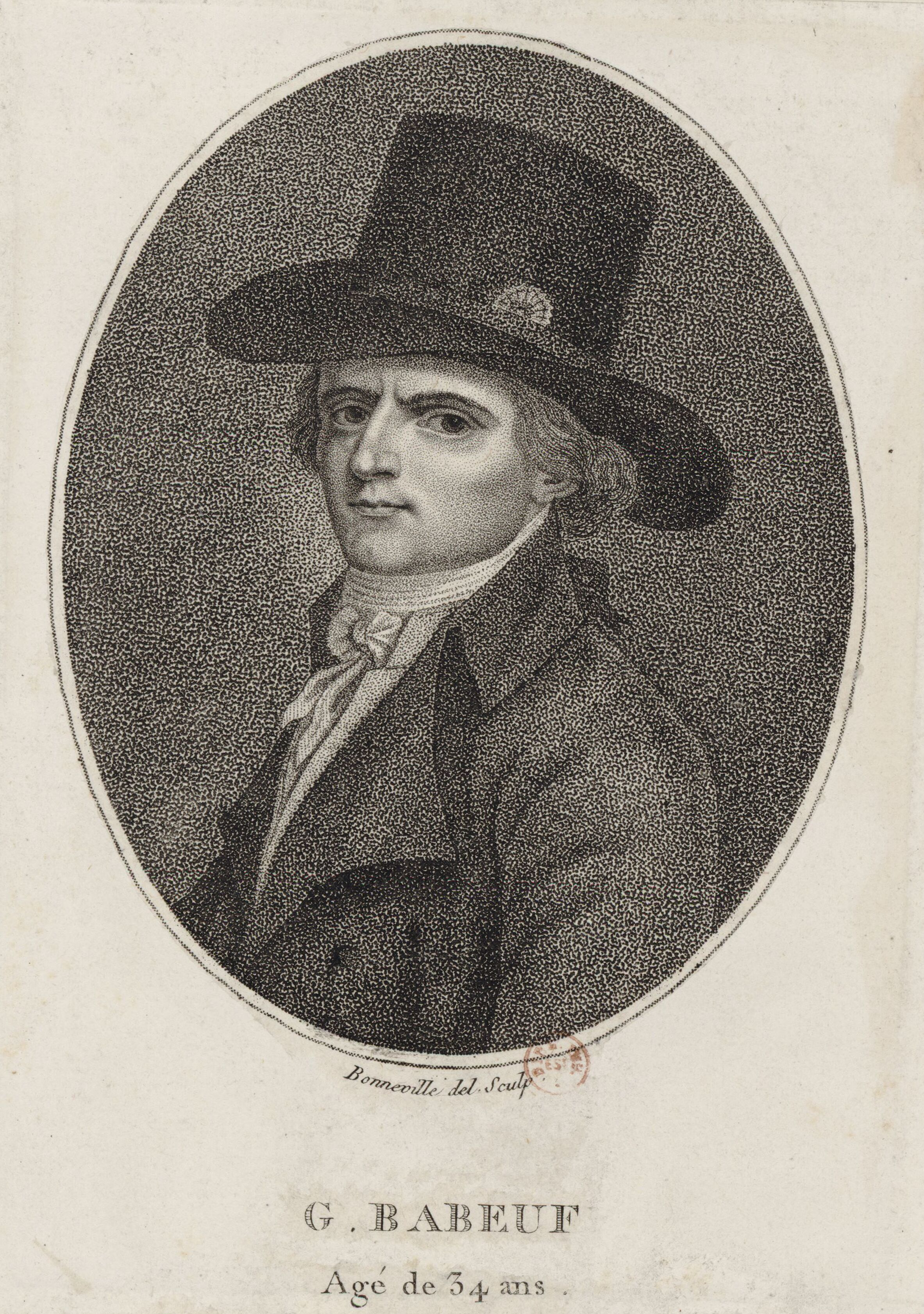
Engraving of "Gracchus Babeuf", who took the name Gracchus from the reformist brothers. He advocated a significantly more radical land reform programme (in comparison with the Gracchan programme) in revolutionary France.

Tiberius' brother, Gaius Sempronius Gracchus, continued his career without incident until he too stood for the tribunate and proposed similarly radical legislation, before also being killed with now explicit approval of the senate. Part of Gaius' land programmes was to start establishing Roman colonies outside of Italy, which later became standard policy in consequence of the more general realisation that Italy was insufficiently large to fulfil popular demands for agricultural land.

Personally, the killing of Tiberius also caused a greater break between Scipio Aemilianus and his Claudian and Gracchan relatives, especially after Scipio Aemilianus approved of Tiberius' murder.

=== Political impact ===
The impact of Tiberius' murder started a cycle of increased aristocratic violence to suppress popular movements. By introducing violent repression, the senatorial oligarchy created norms making future repression more acceptable. Political disputes in the middle republic were not resolved by killing political opponents and purging them from the body politic; before this point domestic political strife basically never resulted in violent death. Roman republican law, when passing ostensibly capital sentences, permitted convicts to flee the city into permanent exile.

His death also suggested that the republic itself was temperamentally unsuited for producing the types of economic reforms wanted or hypothetically needed, as in Tiberius' framing, by the people. However, Tiberius' actions did not mark him as an enemy of the senate seeking to destroy its authority: he sought a traditional career in the senate and irresponsibly engaged in excessive popular indulgences to further his career. Yet, his aggressive political tactics also showed that the republic's norms and institutions were far weaker than expected, that a non-existential political issue such as distributing public land to help with army recruitment, could overwhelm the republican constitution.

The senate's continued pursuit of Tiberius Gracchus' supporters also entrenched polarisation in the Roman body politic, while at the same time endorsing private use of violence to enforce or suppress a group, even a majority, of fellow countrymen. While the framing of Tiberius Gracchus' murder in terms of religious ritual sets it aside from the explicitly political killings of Gaius Gracchus and Marcus Fulvius Flaccus that were authorised by the senate, the use of violence in of itself subverted the norms of consensual republican government.

=== Periodisation ===
The death of Tiberius Gracchus in 133 BC has been viewed, both in the Roman period and in modern scholarship, as the start of a new period in which politics was polarised and political violence normalised.

In the ancient period, Cicero remarked as much in saying "the death of Tiberius Gracchus, and, even before his death, the whole character of his tribunate, divided one people into two factions". Modern historians such as Mary Beard, however, warn that Cicero's claim is "rhetorical oversimplification [and that] the idea there had been a calm consensus at Rome between rich and poor until [133 BC] is at best a nostalgic fiction".

More modern commentators also express similar views. For example, Andrew Lintott writes:

In this way Sigonio has helped to create the standard modern periodisation, whereby the Conflict of the Orders ends in 287 and the decline of the Republic begins in 133, the intervening period displaying the constitution at its best.

In the second edition of The Cambridge Companion to the Roman Republic, Jürgen von Ungern-Sternberg similarly writes:

It was Tiberius' assassination that made the year 133 BC a turning point in Roman history and the beginning of the crisis of the Roman Republic.

=== Impact on the Italian allies ===
Contrary to Appian's claims about how Tiberius acted to give Rome's Italian allies land, there are no seeming indications that Tiberius Gracchus' reforms helped them in any way. Moreover, it was the Italian allies who launched the fiercest opposition to the land reform programme; Tiberius Gracchus' supporters also are never Italians in Appian's account, but only rural plebeians.

After Rome acquired its public lands via conquest, the Italians expected that their rights to use it continually were surety for their loyal conduct. While those who complained the most were likely rich over-occupiers, Appian also reports that the commission's work was rushed and inaccurate. Furthermore, the land given in exchange for land taken per the lex agraria might have been of inferior quality, also stoking resentment.

By altering this implicit agreement, the loyalty of the Italian allies during the Punic Wars and other conflicts therefore had won nothing. In the end, Roman enforcement of its long-unexercised rights over the ager publicus, stoking resentment and removing disincentives to rebellion, contributed to the Social War between Rome and its Italian allies. This interaction between the Italians and land reform also brought up later proposals, including those of Tiberius' younger brother, to trade the Italian aristocracy's occupied lands for Roman citizenship or provocatio rights.

=== Modern legacy ===
The French revolutionary François-Noël Babeuf took up the name Gracchus Babeuf in emulation of the then-contemporary view of the Roman brothers as revolutionaries who were misinterpreted as seeking limitations on private property. He also published a newspaper, Le tribun du peuple ("the tribune of the people"). Modern perspectives see the comparison as unapt, as Babeuf intended abolish private land ownership entirely and overthrow the French republic, goals incompatible with Tiberius'.

== Bibliography ==
=== Modern sources ===
- Astin, A E (1958). "The lex annalis before Sulla". Latomus. 17 (1): 49–64. ISSN 0023-8856. JSTOR 41518780.
- Badian, E (1979). "Review of "Tiberius Sempronius Gracchus: tradition and apostasy"". The American Journal of Philology. 100 (3): 452–458. doi:10.2307/293952. ISSN 0002-9475. JSTOR 293952.
- Beard, Mary (2015). SPQR: a history of ancient Rome (1st ed.). New York: WW Norton and Company. ISBN 978-0-87140-423-7. OCLC 902661394.
- Brennan, T Corey (2014). "Power and process under the republican "constitution"". In Flower, Harriet (ed.). The Cambridge companion to the Roman republic (2nd ed.). Cambridge University Press. ISBN 978-1-107-66942-0.
- Broughton, Thomas Robert Shannon (1951). The magistrates of the Roman republic. Vol. 1. New York: American Philological Association.
- Brunt, P A (1988). The fall of the Roman republic and related essays. Clarendon. ISBN 0-19-814849-6. OCLC 799090262.
- de Ligt, Luuk (2004). "Poverty and demography: the case of the Gracchan land reforms". Mnemosyne. 57 (6): 725–757. doi:10.1163/1568525043083541. ISSN 0026-7074. JSTOR 4433605.
- de Ligt, Luuk (2012). Peasants, citizens, and soldiers: studies in the demographic history of Roman Italy 225 BC – AD 100. Cambridge University Press. ISBN 978-1-107-01318-6. LCCN 2011032182.
- Lintott, Andrew (1994). "Political history, 146–95 BC". In Crook, John; et al. (eds.). The Cambridge ancient history. Vol. 9 (2nd ed.). Cambridge University Press. ISBN 0-521-85073-8. OCLC 121060.
- Flower, Harriet (2010). Roman republics. Princeton: Princeton University Press. ISBN 978-0-691-14043-8. OCLC 301798480.
- Goldsworthy, Adrian (2006). Caesar: life of a colossus. Yale University Press. ISBN 0-300-12048-6.
- Goldsworthy, Adrian (2016) [2003]. In the name of Rome: the men who won the Roman Empire. New Haven: Yale University Press. ISBN 978-0-300-22183-1. OCLC 936322646.
- Gruen, Erich S (1968). Roman politics and the criminal courts: 149–78 BC. Cambridge: Harvard University Press. LCCN 68-29179.
- Gruen, Erich S (1995). The last generation of the Roman republic. Berkeley: University of California Press. ISBN 0-520-02238-6. OCLC 943848.
- Mackay, Christopher S (2009). The breakdown of the Roman republic. Cambridge University Press. ISBN 978-0-521-51819-2.
- Mouritsen, Henrik (2017). Politics in the Roman republic. Cambridge University Press. ISBN 9781107031883.
- Roselaar, Saskia T (2010). Public land in the Roman republic: a social and economic history of ager publicus in Italy, 396-89 BC. Oxford: Oxford University Press. ISBN 978-0-19-957723-1. OCLC 520714519.
- Rosenstein, Nathan (1986). ""Imperatores Victi": the case of C Hostilius Mancinus". Classical Antiquity. 5 (2): 230–252. doi:10.2307/25010850. ISSN 0278-6656. JSTOR 25010850.
- Russell, Peter (2008). "Babeuf and the Gracchi: a comparison of means and ends" (PDF). Melbourne Historical Journal. 36: 41–57. Pages not consistently numbered.
- Scullard, H H (1982). From the Gracchi to Nero. Taylor Francis. ISBN 0-415-02527-3.
- von Ungern-Sternberg, Jurgen (2014). "The crisis of the republic". In Flower, Harriet (ed.). The Cambridge companion to the Roman republic (2nd ed.). Cambridge University Press. ISBN 978-1-107-66942-0.
- Yakobson, Alexander (2006). "Popular power in the Roman republic". In Rosenstein, Nathan Stewart; Morstein-Marx, Robert (eds.). A companion to the Roman Republic. Blackwell. pp. 383–400. ISBN 978-1-4051-7203-5. OCLC 86070041.

=== Ancient sources ===
- Appian. Bella civilia – via LacusCurtius.
- Plutarch. "Life of Tiberius Gracchus". Parallel lives – via LacusCurtius.
