= Lucius Cornelius Lentulus Caudinus (consul 275 BC) =

Roman consul in 275 BC

Lucius Cornelius Lentulus Caudinus was a Roman politician in the third century BC.

== Family ==
He was a member of gens Cornelia. His grandfather is believed to be Servius Cornelius Lentulus, consul of 303 BC. sons were the consuls Lucius Cornelius Lentulus Caudinus and Publius Cornelius Lentulus Caudinus in 237 and 236 BC, respectively.

== Career ==
Lucius Cornelius Lentulus served as consul in 275 BC with Manius Curius Dentatus as his colleague. While Dentatus was fighting against Pyrrhus, King of Epirus, Cornelius defeated the Samnites, triumphed and assumed the cognomen Caudinus.
