= Gaius Mamilius Turrinus =

Roman consul 239 BC

Gaius Mamilius Turrinus was a Roman politician in the third century BC.

== Family ==
He was a member of the plebeian gens Mamilia. His father and grandfather's praenomen was Quintus. Legend has it that the gens Mamilia originated in Tusculum and descended from Telegonus, the son of Odysseus and Circe.

== Career ==
He served as consul in 239 BC. His colleague was Quintus Valerius Falto.
