= Lex agraria (disambiguation) =

A lex agraria was a Roman law relating to the viritane allotment of public lands. The phrase may also refer to one of the following:

- Lex Sempronia agraria (133 BC) by Tiberius Gracchus
- Lex agraria of 111 BC usually identified as the lex Thoria
- Lex Appuleia agraria (103–100 BC) by Lucius Appuleius Saturninus
- Leges Juliae agrariae (59 BC), two agrarian laws, by Julius Caesar
- Lex Antonia agraria (44 BC) by Mark Antony
