= Lex agraria =

Ancient Roman law

A lex agraria (pl.: leges agrariae) was a Roman law which dealt primarily with the viritane allotment of public lands. Such laws came largely from two sources: the disposition of lands annexed by Rome in consequence of expansion and the distribution of existing public lands to poor citizens as freeholds. Such legislation dealt almost exclusively with public lands which were held by the state and not privately owned. There were other types of Roman laws related to agriculture, including those establishing new colonies and those regulating the holding of public lands (lex de modo agrorum).

The most famous lex agraria was the Lex Sempronia agraria of the plebeian tribune Tiberius Gracchus, passed in 133 BC, which allotted public lands across Italy to rural plebs. Such laws were not without precedent, such as the [[Gaius Flaminius (consul 223 BC)|lex Flaminia of 232 BC]] which authorised viritane distributions of lands in Cisalpine Gaul and Picenum. Further such laws were also passed in the years after 133 BC, including that of Tiberius' younger brother Gaius in 122 BC, and the epigraphically attested lex agraria of 111 BC. The law of 111 BC, among other things, buttressed recognition of the lands distributed in the prior law of 133. Other leges agrariae include a series of three laws vaguely described by Appian, the laws of Saturninus in 103 and 100 BC, the laws of Julius Caesar in 59 BC, and a law of Mark Antony in 44 BC.

== See also ==
- Compascuus
- Roman law
- List of Roman laws

== Bibliography ==
- Broughton, Thomas Robert Shannon (1951). The magistrates of the Roman republic. Vol. 1. New York: American Philological Association.
- Hornblower, Simon; et al., eds. (2012). The Oxford classical dictionary (4th ed.). Oxford University Press. ISBN 978-0-19-954556-8. OCLC 959667246.
  - Badian, Ernst (2012a). "Sempronius Gracchus, Tiberius (3)". In OCD^{4} (2012).
  - Badian, Ernst (2012b). "Sempronius Gracchus, Gracchus". In OCD^{4} (2012).
  - Briscoe, John. "Flaminius (1), Gaius". In OCD^{4} (2012).
  - Lintott, Andrew. "Agrarian laws and policy". In OCD^{4} (2012).
- Roselaar, Saskia T (2010). Public land in the Roman republic. Oxford studies in Roman society and law. Oxford University Press. ISBN 978-0-19-957723-1.
