= Ordines (ancient Roman) =

Roman social division

Ordines in ancient Rome were social classes. One's position in the Ordines was determined by wealth and birth. Equestrians and senators were required to maintain high levels of wealth and own large amounts of property in order to remain a part of their class. Lower-class people could rise to higher ordines through gaining wealth. People also needed to be born into high social status in order to join these classes. Prior to the reforms of the Gracchi brothers there were only two ordines, patricians and plebeians. Following the reforms of Gaius Gracchus, the equestrian class was split off into its own ordo. The term was also applied to military companies under the maniple system.
