= Gracchi brothers =

Ancient Roman brothers known for their social reforms

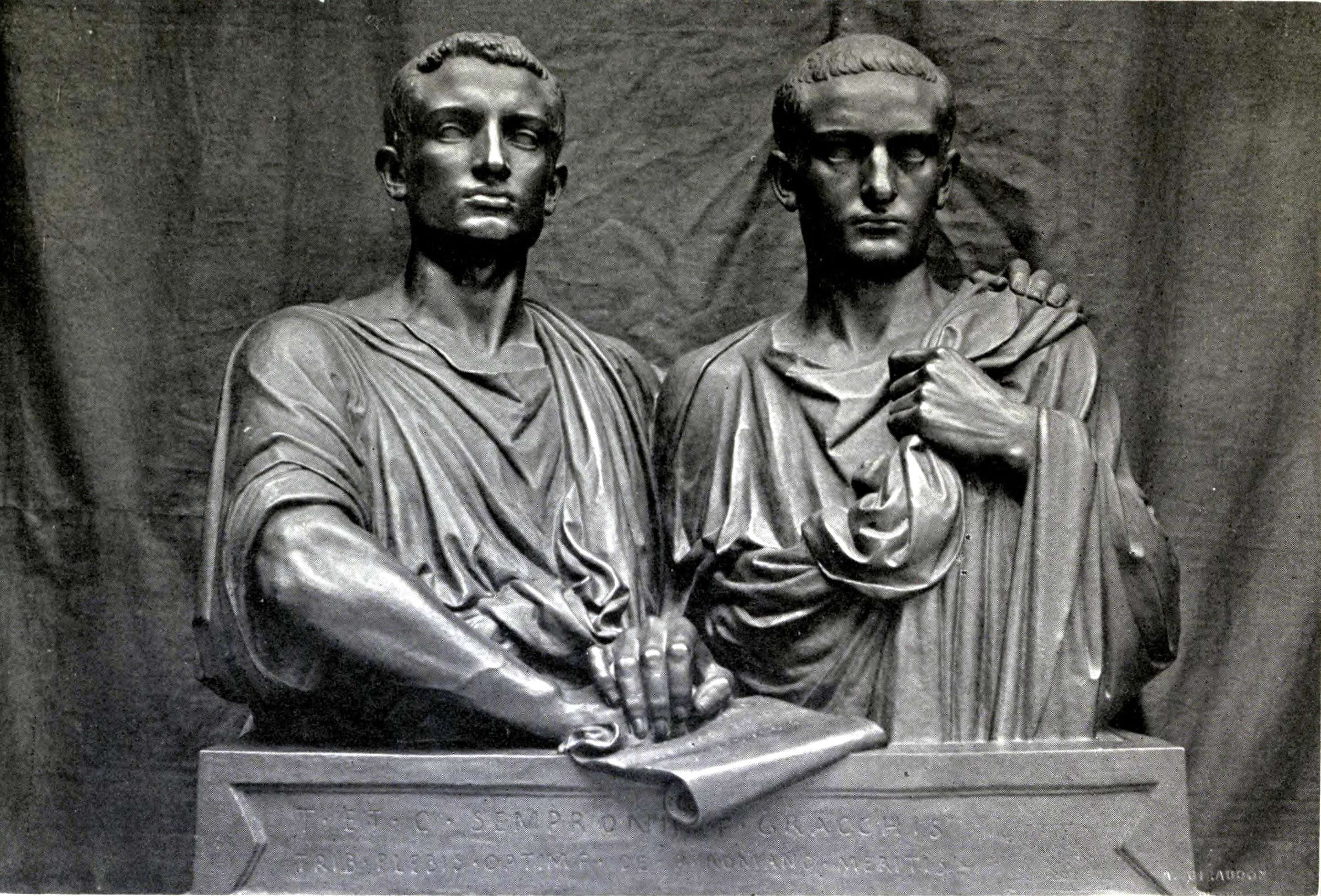
Depiction of the two brothers made during the 19th century by Eugene Guillaume, today located at the Musée d'Orsay in Paris. The brothers lay their hands on a document titled "property", consistent with then-current interpretations of their lives.

The Gracchi brothers were two brothers who lived during the beginning of the late Roman Republic: Tiberius Gracchus and Gaius Gracchus. They served in the plebeian tribunates of 133 BC and 122–121 BC, respectively. They have been received as well-born and eloquent advocates for social reform who were both killed by a reactionary political system; their terms in the tribunate precipitated a series of domestic crises which are viewed as unsettling the Roman Republic and contributing to its collapse.

Tiberius Gracchus passed legislation which established a commission to survey Roman public land, reassert state claims to it, and redistribute it to poor rural farmers. These reforms were a reaction to a perceived decline in Italy's rural population. A decade later, Gaius Gracchus' reforms, among other things, attempted to buttress Tiberius' land commission and start Roman colonisation outside of Italy. They also were far broader, touching on many topics such as assignment of provincial commands, composition of juries for the permanent courts, and letting of state tax farming contracts. Both brothers were killed during or shortly after the conclusion of their respective tribunician terms.

Recent scholarship on the Roman economy has viewed the Gracchan agrarian reforms as less impactful than claimed in the ancient sources. It is also clear that the vast majority of their reformist legislation was left intact rather than repealed. Some modern scholars also connect the agrarian reforms to degrading Rome's relations with its Italian allies and the Social War, as the reforms were a reassertion of Roman claims on public land that had been for decades largely occupied without title by Rome's Italian allies. Gracchan claims of Italian rural depopulation also are contradicted by archaeological evidence. The impact of the violent reaction to the two brothers, however, is of substantial import: it set a dangerous precedent that violence was an acceptable tool against political enemies.

The Gracchi exerted a substantial influence on later politics. They were viewed alternately as popular martyrs or dangerous demagogues through the late republic. They were also portrayed as social revolutionaries and proto-socialists during the French Revolution and afterwards; in that vein, they motivated social revolutionaries such as François-Noël "Gracchus" Babeuf and opposition to enclosure in Britain. Scholars today view these influential socialist comparisons as unapt.

== Background ==
Transmitted from the ancient sources, the traditional view on the state of rural Italy in the second century was one of substantial decline. Modern survey archaeology, however, from the 1980s onwards has shown that it "has been much overstated" and that the narrative connecting military service to the decline of the yeomanry, moreover, "has to be rejected". Indeed, "impressive methodological advances that have been achieved in survey archaeology have ... done much to undermine the credibility of earlier claims concerning the spread of slave-staffed estates and the survival or otherwise of subsistence-oriented smallholders".

=== Rural conditions, 159–33 BC ===
Difficulty in and resistance against conscripting men is reported through the second century BC, starting in the Third Macedonian War and continuing through Roman campaigns in Spain from 151 BC. Roman censuses – which were conducted largely to tally men for conscription – starting in 159 BC also began to note a reduction in the free population of Italy, falling from 328,316 in 159–58 BC down to a low of 317,933 in the census of 136–35 BC. Politicians reacted to these constraints by securing volunteers for service; Gracchan agricultural policy was meant to reverse this population decline and minimise the impacts of conscription.

While the census reported a fall in the number of citizens, leading to difficulties in drafting men for service, this did not necessarily imply an actual fall in the population of rural Italy. Because the easiest way to dodge the draft was not to self-report to the censors, no actual decline in population is necessary to explain those census results. Moreover, the censuses of 125–24 BC and 115–14 BC indicate large and rapid increases which are incompatible with any actual decline in Italian rural populations.

Archaeological evidence of small farms attested all over Italy in the second century and the general need for free labour during harvest time has also led scholars to conclude that "there are no good grounds for inferring a general decline of the small independent farmer in the second century". The Gracchan narrative of rural population decline through 133 BC – "long since... shown to be false" – likely emerged not from a general and actual decline in rural free-holding, but rather generalisation from a local decline in coastal Etruria, where commercial slave plantations were dominant. And while Gracchan observations of rural poverty were likely true, this was not a result of slave-dominated plantations crowding out poor farmers, but overpopulation under Malthusian conditions.

In rural areas closer to Rome, the rising population alongside the effect of partible inheritance dividing farms into smaller and smaller plots made many family farms unviable. The high demand for agricultural land near Rome, due to its closeness to produce markets, motivated those farmers to sell their small plots to rich men, either moving or engaging instead in wage labour, which large farms especially needed during the harvest. The economic situation in the years prior to 133 BC was also abnormally negative: a pause in the construction of public buildings meant there was little construction work to be found at the city, and prices for food were also inflated by an ongoing slave revolt in Sicily, a major grain exporter.

=== Public land ===
This map shows Roman lands – the ager Romanus – in 133 BC. The ager was largely intermingled with the allied lands that covered essentially the rest of peninsula and required extensive surveying to disentangle.

The Roman conquest of Italy from the fourth century BC onwards meant that the republic held legal rights to large swaths of land taken from the subjugated Italians. This ager publicus, however, was not heavily utilised by the Roman state or its lessors. Rather, the state simply let the defeated Italians continue to work the land, regarding this arrangenment as "a sort of beneficium to the allies". In essence, while Rome acquired nominal title to these lands, the Italians were permitted de facto to use them while also profitting from the influx of booty and wealth from Roman conquest.

The traditional narrative in the ancient sources that described the emergence of commercial latifundia (enormous slave-staffed plantations owned by the elite) on the public land itself is also largely unattested to by the archaeological evidence in this period. Moreover, evidence indicates that the ager publicus was largely located outside of the traditional farmlands close to Rome and instead located in non-Roman Italy closer to the Italian allies. Public land redistribution was therefore necessarily at the expense of the allies, who would be evicted from ancestral lands still occupied.

=== Early life of the Gracchi ===
Tiberius Sempronius Gracchus was born c. 163 BC. His younger brother Gaius was born c. 154 BC. They were the sons of the Tiberius Sempronius Gracchus who had been consul 177 and 163 BC as well as censor in 169 BC. He had triumphed twice in 178 and 175 BC. Their mother was Cornelia, the daughter of the renowned general Scipio Africanus, the hero of the Second Punic War. Their sister Sempronia also was the wife of Scipio Aemilianus, another important general and politician.

Tiberius' military career started in 147 BC, serving as a legate or military tribune under his brother-in-law, Scipio Aemilianus during the campaign to take Carthage during the Third Punic War. Tiberius, along with Gaius Fannius, was among the first to scale Carthage's walls, serving through to the next year. A decade later, in 137 BC, he was quaestor under the consul Gaius Hostilius Mancinus in Hispania Citerior. The campaign, part of the Numantine War, was unsuccessful; Mancinus and his army lost several skirmishes outside the city before a confused night-time retreat led them to be surrounded on the site of a camp from a prior campaign in 153 BC. Tiberius negotiated a treaty of surrender, aided in part by his father's positive reputation built during a praetorship in 179–78 BC; Tiberius' treaty, however, was humiliatingly rejected by the senate after his return to Rome.

== Reforms ==
Reform and obstruction were not unheard of prior to 133, the year of Tiberius' tribunate. Tiberius' land reform proposal was also not entirely novel. In 140 BC the consul Gaius Laelius Sapiens had proposed similar legislation. However, amid opposition from the senate and after a military crisis diverted his attention elsewhere, the proposal was withdrawn.

In 139 and 137 BC, laws had been passed to create and extend the secret ballot in legislative and judicial votes before the assemblies. These bills were likely justified as a means of preserving voters' independence and preventing corruption: both social pressure and financial compulsion would be more difficult if voters' ballots could not be so easily tracked. They were also likely a necessary condition for the Gracchan programme, since they insulated the assemblies from elite control. For this reason, the historian Harriet Flower in the 2010 book Roman Republics demarcates a new phase of the republic at 139 BC.

Opposition was also not unheard of but had been resolved amicably. A tribune vetoed the lex Cassia tabellaria in 137, with the support of one of the consuls, but under pressure from the highly influential Scipio Aemilianus gave way.

The ancient historians, especially Plutarch, viewed the Gracchan reforms and brothers as a single unit. Modern scholars have started to view them separately and in their own political contexts.

=== Tiberius ===
Views on Gracchus' motives differ. Favourable ancient sources attribute his reforms to spirited advocacy for the poor. Less favourable ancient sources, such as Cicero, instead attribute his actions to an attempt to win back dignitas and standing after the embarrassing treaty he was forced to negotiate after defeat in Spain. It cannot be doubted that, even if he was a true believer in the need for reform, Tiberius hoped to further his fame and political standing among the elite.

==== Agrarian reforms ====
Map of Gracchan land distributions. In red, distributions are attested to by archaeological finds of the boundary stones (cippi). In yellow, cippi are very likely.

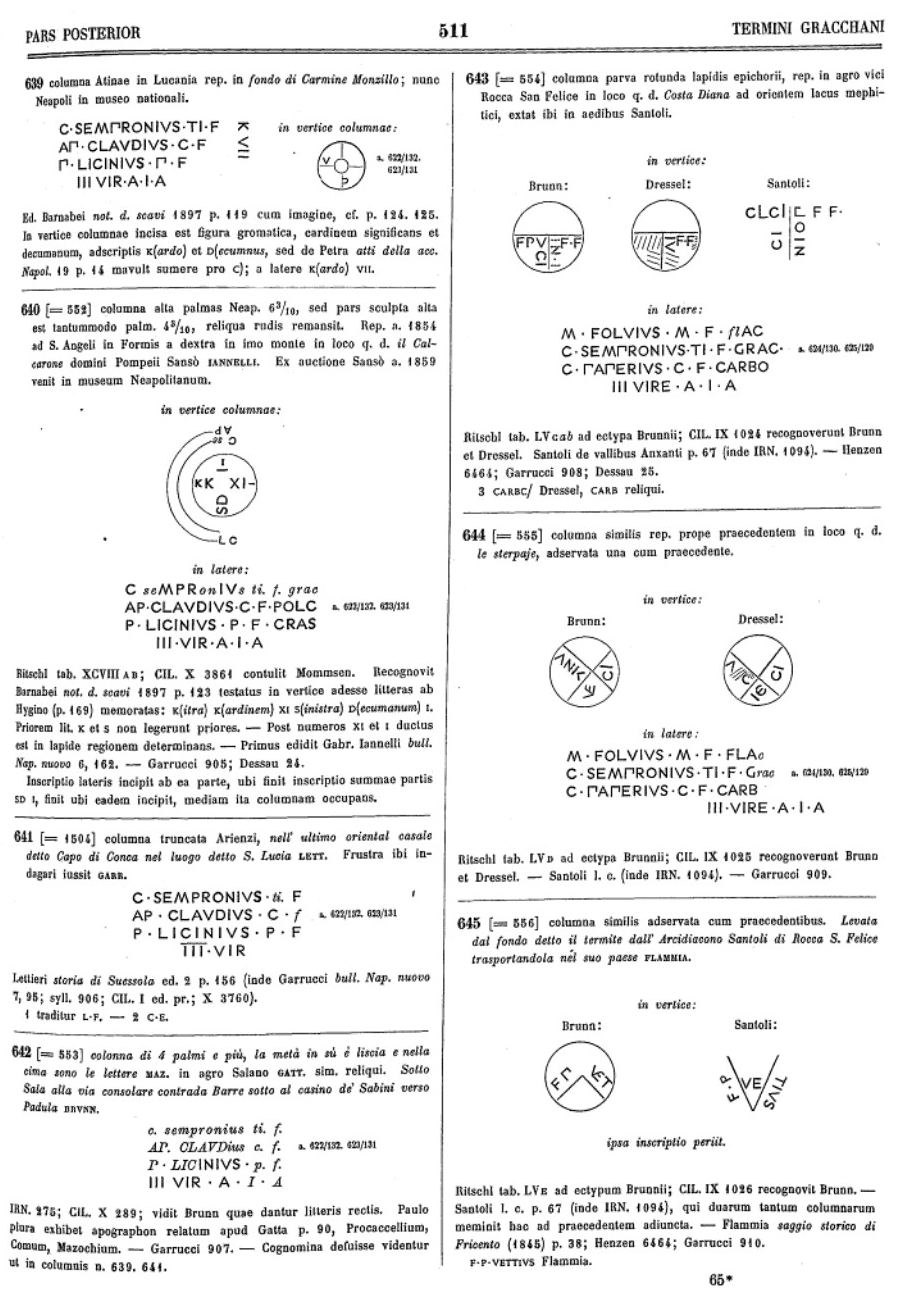
This page in the revised edition of the Corpus Inscriptionum Latinarum describes a number of columns documenting the work of Tiberius' land commission and its membership at various times. His brother Gaius and father-in-law Appius Claudius Pulcher appear multiple times.

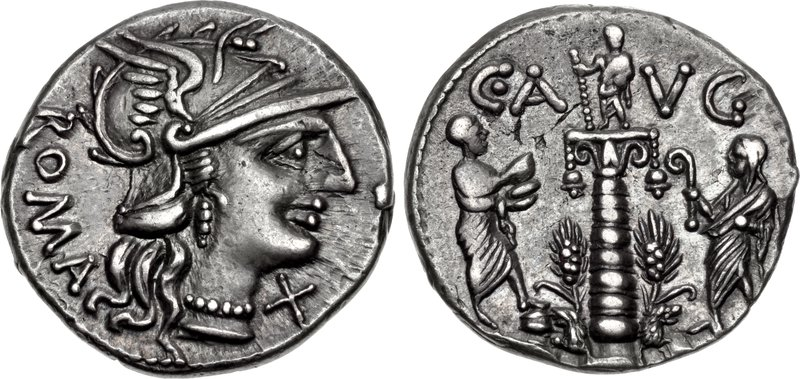
Denarius of Gaius Minucius Augurinus, 135 BC, depicting the columna Minucia, which itself showed a grain distribution by Lucius Minucius Augurinus. It shows that grain distribution was already a hot topic several years before Tiberius' tribunate. He or his brother Tiberius probably replaced Octavius as tribune in 133.

The main goal of Tiberius' agrarian proposal was three-fold:

- establish a commission to investigate, survey, and catalogue the public lands;
- limit the amount of public land any one possessor could hold to about 500 jugera (~125 ha), possibly up to 1,000 jugera for those with two children; and
- privatise all remaining land by distributing it to poor Roman citizens (Italians were excluded).

The purpose of the reform was to stimulate population growth and expand the number of people who would meet the property qualifications for service in the Roman army. The inclusion of the limit of 500 jugera was for the purpose of painting the law as a return to mos maiorum and the Sextian-Licinian rogations so to avoid any charges of novelty. Whether the Sextian-Licinian rogations in fact had such a clause is unclear; what mattered to Tiberius and his allies was that they believed it did.

Land distributed was likely done so with a prohibition on alienation and a vectigal (rent). Alienation was prohibited to prevent recipients from simply reselling the land. The vectigal served to allow the land to revert to the state if a citizen walked away from the allotment; reversion would then allow the state to settle someone else on the land. The veteres possessores (old possessors) also would receive security of tenure over their lands, up to the 500 or 1,000 jugera limit.

Tiberius was supported in his endeavour by like-minded aristocrats who also viewed the perceived problem of rural depopulation seriously – among those in support of the proposal were the consul of 133 BC, Publius Mucius Scaevola, and Scaevola's brother, Publius Licinius Crassus Dives Mucianus, – he may have been put up to pass the proposals by his allies. He was also successful in rallying large numbers of rural plebs to Rome to vote in favour of the plan. The proposals were likely not appealing to the urban plebs, who would not have had the agricultural skills necessary to benefit from the allotments.

He was opposed in the assembly by one of the other tribunes, Marcus Octavius. There were largely three grounds for opposition: first, the dispossession would harm the ruling classes of both Rome and the Italian allies; second, the law unfairly dispossessed people who had put money into the improvement of possessed lands; third, that dispossession also would unsettle dowries pledged against possessed land and transactions made under the assumption that tenure was secure. When the vote arrived and Octavius interposed his tribunician veto, the matter was brought before the senate, but no settlement was reached. Unwilling to back down, Tiberius – unprecedentedly – had the assembly depose Octavius from office and vote the legislation through.

==== Death ====
Violent opposition to Tiberius' agrarian policy did not come to a head until he moved legislation to use the inheritance of Attalus III of Pergamon for the land commission. The ancient sources differ on the question of what Attalus' bequest was to be dedicated: Plutarch claims it was to be used to help land recipients purchase farm equipment; Livy, via epitome, claims that it was to be used to purchase more land for distribution after there turned out to be little land available.

This second proposal infringed on senatorial prerogatives over foreign policy and public finances. Senators also feared that Tiberius was arrogating the republic's money to win himself personal support with handouts. Tiberius then announced his intention to stand for re-election; according to Livy, this was illegal, due to a law which forbade holding the same magistracy within ten years. The sources allege that Tiberius also announced plans for a significantly more broad set of reforms, but these may be retrojections of his brother Gaius' later-consummated proposals. On the day of the election, Tiberius seized the Capitoline Hill, possibly to intimidate voters or exclude his enemies from casting their votes; Tiberius' opponents accused him of having kingly aspirations and attempted to induce the consul in the senate to use force to stop his re-election. The consul refused to act extralegally, but one of the other senators, Publius Cornelius Scipio Nasica Serapio, found this reply unacceptable and led an impromptu military levy of senators, which included one of Tiberius' colleagues in the plebeian tribunate; with Nasica, who was pontifex maximus, reenacting an archaic sacrificial ritual, they then stormed the Capitoline and bludgeoned Tiberius and a number of his supporters to death.

It was largely constitutional issues which impelled the violent reaction, not the agrarian laws. The reaction was motivated in part by Greek constitutional thought which created a narrative of popular mobilisation leading inexorably to popular tyranny. Such beliefs were compounded by the recent example of tyranny in Sparta, led by Nabis, which had come to power with a reform programme of cancelling debts and redistributing lands.

==== Effects ====
Tiberius' lex agraria and the land commission survived his death. Opposition was to Tiberius' methods rather than his policies; it is likely that most senators agreed with the reform programme in principle. Archaeologists have recovered the commission's boundary stones (cippi), which documenting the three commissioners' activities from 133 to 130 BC. The boundary locations and descriptions imply that over just a few years they distributed some 3,268 square kilometres of land to Roman citizens, concentrated in southern Italy and benefitting some 15,000 households.

The cippi largely name Tiberius' younger brother Gaius, Appius Claudius Pulcher, and Publius Licinius Crassus. While Tiberius appointed himself to the commission after his death Crassus was elected in his place. After the natural deaths of Appius Claudius and Crassus by 130 BC, the vacancies were filled by Marcus Fulvius Flaccus and Gaius Papirius Carbo.

Because one of the commission's goals was in reasserting Roman claims to land which by that time had long been occupied by the Italian allies, the allies started to complain of unfairness and inaccurate rushed surveying. In 129, those complaints were heard by the senate, who also took the opportunity to limit the agrarian commission's powers. Scipio Aemilianus proposed and received from the senate a decree which assigned the power to determine contested ownership to the consuls. By 129 BC, the commission had over some three years distributed much of the available uncontested land. Archaeological finds of Gracchan cippi largely stop after 129 BC.

=== Gaius ===
Discontent among the Italian allies had grown between Tiberius' land commission and the later 120s BC. One of the land commissioners elected in the early 120s BC, Marcus Fulvius Flaccus had served as consul in 125 BC and – according to Appian – proposed a compromise giving the allies Roman citizenship in exchange for acquiescence to Roman reassertion of claims to the ager publicus. This proposal, however, fell through when Flaccus was dispatched to war in Transalpine Gaul; relations with the allies were also not helped by the revolt and destruction of the Latin colony of Fregellae when Flaccus' proposals were withdrawn.

Gaius positioned himself politically as the inheritor of Tiberius' popularity and political programme. After a quaestorship, he was elected fourth in the tribunician elections of 124 BC; after his election, he cast his brother's death as "a failure by the plebeians to maintain their tradition of defending their tribunes". Unlike his brother, Gaius' proposals largely did not relate to land. Over two years, he proposed broad legislation touching all parts of Roman government, from tax collection to senatorial provincial assignments.

==== Reforms ====
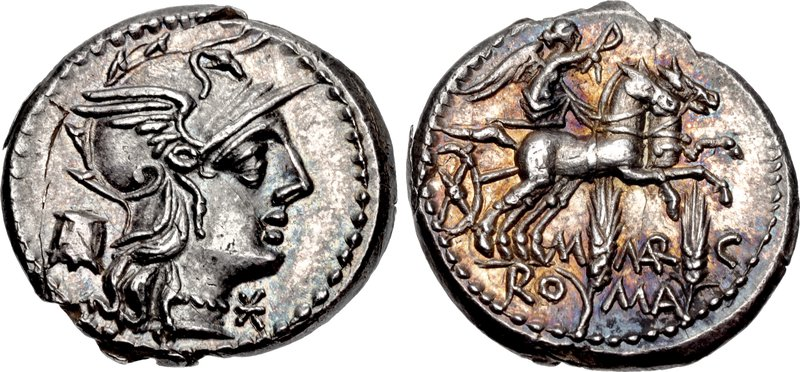
Denarius of Marcus Marcius minted in 134 BC. The modius on the obverse and the corn-ears on the reverse refer to his ancestor Manius Marcius, plebeian aedile c. 440 BC, who made a distribution of grain at a cheap price of 1 as per modius.

During his first tribunate, he proposed a number of laws. First, he proposed legislation to bar anyone who the people had deposed from office from further office. This was, however, dropped at the instigation of his mother Cornelia. The proposal was likely meant to intimidate the other tribunes so they would not exercise their vetoes. He then passed legislation reaffirming provocatio rights and retroactively extending them to the sentences of exile which the consular commission in 132 BC had passed against Tiberius' supporters. Publius Popillius Laenas, the consul who had led the commission and was thereby opened to prosecution for violating those rights, immediately left the city for exile in Campania.

Gaius also moved legislation which would benefit the rich equestrians, especially those who served as Rome's public contractors (the publicani):

- Gaius changed the bidding location of public tax farming contracts from the provinces to Rome, which increased oversight and favoured high-ranking equites in the capital rather than provincial elites.
- He also passed legislation to build roads, which he would oversee, with contracts let out to the equestrians.
- He also made equites the dominant body for juries for the permanent court on corruption. After, however, the acquittal of a corrupt consul that year, Gaius, with the support of an allied tribune, made the equites the sole class staffing the juries.

Gaius also recognised the weakness of Tiberius' coalition, which relied only on the rural plebs, and therefore sought to expand it. To do so, he courted the urban plebs with legislation establishing Roman colonies both in Italy and abroad at Carthage. He also carried legislation to stop deduction of soldier pay for equipment and to establish a minimum age for conscription at 17. In this package, Gaius also introduced the grain subsidy which allowed all citizens to purchase grain at a subsidised price of six and two-thirds sesterces per modius.

Further legislation also regulated the magistrates and the senate. Even though the ancient sources generally cast these reforms as part of "an elaborate plot against the authority of the senate... he showed no sign of wanting to replace the senate in its normal functions". Nor were his reforms meant to undermine the senate indirectly or establish a democracy. Rather, Gaius was seeking to have the senators act more in the public interest rather than in their own private interests. To that end, with an ally in the tribunate, Manlius Acilius Glabrio, he also moved legislation reforming the provincial corruption laws. Also importantly, he passed the lex Sempronia de provinciis consularibus, which required the senate to assign consular provinces prior to the elections of the consuls and insulated this decision from tribunician veto.

Some ancient sources claim that Gaius wanted to change voting procedures in the timocratic comitia centuriata to make it more democratic. However, this claim is dubious and largely rejected.

Gaius made an extremely controversial proposal to improve the state of the Latins and the other Italian allies: the Latins would receive full Roman citizenship with the Italians upgraded to Latin rights. Doing so further extended to Italians, via Latin rights, the right to vote if present in Rome during elections. This proposal died: the specifics are not entirely clear, it may have been vetoed or otherwise simply withdrawn; recent scholarship now trends towards a veto from Livius Drusus. Gaius, after taking some leave to set up a colony near Carthage, attempted to stand for a third tribunate, but was unsuccessful. It is said that he had sufficient popular support to have been elected, but was not returned because the ten tribunician offices had already been filled.

==== Death ====
Early in the year 121 BC, attempts were made to repeal portions of Gaius' legislation. The main point of repeal, however, was not agrarian legislation or his subsidised grain bill, but the comparatively minor question of the proposed colony at Carthage. After an attendant was killed in the streets by Gaius' supporters, Gaius and his ally Flaccus were summoned to defend themselves before the senate; they refused and barricaded themselves with armed followers on the Aventine Hill. Their refusal was tantamount to rebellion. A senatus consultum ultimum was then moved, instructing the consul Lucius Opimius to ensure the state came to no harm and urging him to suppress Gaius and Flaccus on the Aventine. With a force of militia and Cretan archers, Opimius stormed the Aventine, killing Flaccus and his sons; Gaius was either killed or forced to commit suicide. Opimius then presided over drumhead courts investigating and executing many of Gaius and Flaccus' supporters.

In the end, most of Gaius' reforms were preserved; archaeology has discovered evidence of Gracchan land colonial activities in Africa c. 119 BC and the land commission remained in operation until 111 BC. By that point, almost all land available to distribute had already been distributed. In the whole, "the aristocracy's reaction resembled that of a general dealing with a mutiny, who accedes to most of the demands but executes the ringleaders to preserve discipline".

== Aftermath ==
=== Gracchan leges agrariae ===
Tiberius' reforms were focused on the rural peasantry. They were not, however, "so much oppressed as eager (quite justifiably) to share in the increased economic prosperity brought by Roman imperialism". In general, more recent scholarship has stressed that the ancient sources have exaggerated the extent to which the Roman yeoman farmers were in fact in decline. Tiberius' reform law was not revolutionary, but his tactics in pursuit of it were, especially when they mobilised the assemblies which gave some genuine expression of the popular will. Those tactics threatened "to break the oligarchic stranglehold on Rome's political system, thus leading to his demise". This was exacerbated by Tiberius' use of social justice rhetoric, which further set him aside from his aristocratic brethren.

While substantial acreage was distributed as a whole, more than 3,268 square kilometres in the first few years of operation, there is some debate to the extent to which the Gracchan land allotments were actually economically viable for the families placed atop them. However, there are some indications that the lands distributed were used for pasture rather than intensive agriculture, even if they were suitable for farming.

Gaius' role in land reform is more obscure; the sources are largely unclear on it except in mentioning offhandedly that he brought legislation on the matter. By the time of his tribunate, the census results of 125–24 BC had been published and belief in a depopulation crisis had disappeared. His agrarian reforms likely did little more than grant the agrarian commission – of which he was still a member – the necessary jurisdiction stripped in 129 BC. He was, however, sufficiently visionary to see that further land exactions from Rome's allies would seriously damage their interests (and be politically infeasible). This led him, "one of the first to realise that the amount of land in Italy was insufficient to provide for all inhabitants of the peninsula", to pursue extra-Italian colonisation. This change in scope proved long-lasting and by the time of Caesar, it would be standard policy to establish citizen colonies outside the Italian peninsula, which "would in time prove the only adequate method of finding enough land" for Italy's growing populations.

The Gracchan leges agrariae continued in operation through their deaths until 111 BC, which again overhauled Roman policy with public lands. Much of this law survives to the present. Building upon those laws, it abolished the rents that Tiberius' law passed, making the lands fully private and alienable. By 111 BC, most of the lands that could be distributed already had been; what was left over was "mostly pasture or land which had been assigned to specific people" through long-term leases or set aside for the purpose of providing money for road maintenance. The continuing increase of the Italian population, however, would trigger later proposals for land redistribution; especially notable is Caesar's lex agraria during his consulship in 59 BC, which gave away the ager Campanus to some 20,000 settlers, albeit on less generous terms. After this, it became increasingly clear that there was simply insufficient land in Italy to accommodate demand.

Reassessments of the causes of the Social War have also trended toward viewing the lex agraria as a major contributing factor. Land holdings in Roman-dominated Italy gave the Roman state a latent title to large swaths of land which had never been formally surveyed. While the Gracchan land commission quickly parcelled and redistributed lands in southern Italy that had been confiscated from the allies that had defected to Hannibal during the Second Punic War, the older lands had been occupied for centuries. Attempts, through to the start of the Social War, to press Roman claims on those lands – which "the allies assumed that they would be able to keep... as long as they did not rebel" – may have greatly undermined allied support for Roman hegemony.

=== Gaius' urban and administrative reforms ===
Gaius' reforms were broad and covered large portions of the republic's administration. Their main purpose was to advance the quality of Roman government, reducing extortion and corruption among the senatorial governors while acting within the bounds of what his contemporaries would have considered due process.

One of the elements best attested to is Gaius' lex repetundarum, which reformed the quaestio perpetua on provincial corruption with an equestrian jury to check senatorial governors. The law is preserved on a bronze tablet once owned by Cardinal Pietro Bembo. While, in the long run, the equestrian jury would prove a political issue for the next half century, these reforms were not meant to set the senate and equites into conflict. Nor were they some kind of programme at true popular oversight, as moving the jury from the senators to the equites "merely reallocated influence from one section of the elite to another". Ernst Badian, writing in the Oxford Classical Dictionary, gave the assessment:

A proud aristocrat, [Gaius] wanted to leave the senate in charge of directing policy and the magistrates in charge of its execution, subject to constitutional checks and removed from financial temptation, with the people sharing in the profits of empire without excessive exploitation of the subjects. The ultimate result of his legislation was to set up the publicani as a new exploiting class, not restrained by a tradition of service or by accountability at law. But this did not become clear for a generation, and he cannot be blamed for not foreseeing it.

His lex frumentaria, which created a subsidised grain supply at around what he considered to be a "normal" price, set up an influential model for welfare in Rome. It was a reaction to corn disruptions in recent times that likely developed from army service, but his idea to have the Roman state smooth much of the variability of agriculture put the population less at the mercy of speculators and less dependent on magisterial largesse. The lowered incentives for magistrates giving food away for popularity at home had the added effect of reducing their proclivity to extort corn from provincials. These provisions continued in force after the death of Gaius, suggesting an emerging consensus at Rome that there was a "right of the people to enjoy the rewards of the empire [and that] frumentationes [were useful] to divert the interest and support of the urban plebs from the prospect of agrarian reform". After a period of abrogation by Sulla, the dole in the future would expand, however, both in cost and generosity, as later generations of politicians acted with or without senatorial support to do so.

Gaius' lex de provinciis consularibus was a similar policy to reduce senatorial corruption and was "far from being revolutionary": his purpose with the law "was to prevent sitting consuls from using their position to influence provincial assignments improperly (and perhaps to Rome's detriment)" by requiring provinces to be assigned before the consuls took office. To further insulate such decisions from political meddling, he even made senatorial decisions on consular provinces immune from tribunician veto.

=== Political violence ===
The impact of Tiberius' murder started a cycle of increased political violence: "the oligarchy had introduced violence into the political system with the murder of Tiberius Gracchus and over the years the use of violence became increasingly acceptable as various political disputes in Rome led to more and more bloody discord". The use of force to suppress reform also suggested that the republic itself was temperamentally unsuited for producing the types of economic reforms wanted or needed, as in the Gracchi's framing, by the people.

In terms of periodisation, the death of Tiberius Gracchus in 133 BC is widely viewed as the start of the "late republic" and the beginning of the republic's eventual collapse. For example, in The Cambridge Companion to the Roman Republic, Jürgen von Ungern-Sternberg writes:

It was Tiberius' assassination that made the year 133 BC a turning point in Roman history and the beginning of the crisis of the Roman Republic.

Even in ancient times, Cicero remarked as much in saying "the death of Tiberius Gracchus, and even before that the whole rationale behind his tribunate, divided a united people into two distinct groups". However, scholars such as Mary Beard also warn that Cicero is exaggerating for rhetorical effect and that "the idea there had been a calm consensus at Rome between rich and poor until [133 BC] is at best a nostalgic fiction".

The death of Gaius as well inaugurated a new tool for the senate in upholding the current order by force: the so-called senatus consultum ultimum. Opimius was prosecuted in 120 BC for violating Gaius' law against extralegal punishment. The ex-consul, however, was able to successfully defend himself by appealing to the senate's decree and by arguing that Gaius and Flaccus deserved to be treated as seditious enemies rather than citizens. Opimius' acquittal set the precedent that the senatus consultum ultimum – which was merely advice from the senate: "the senate could pass any decree it liked, it was the magistrate who was responsible for any illegal actions" – was an acceptable ground to vitiate citizen rights extralegally.

== Reception and historiography ==
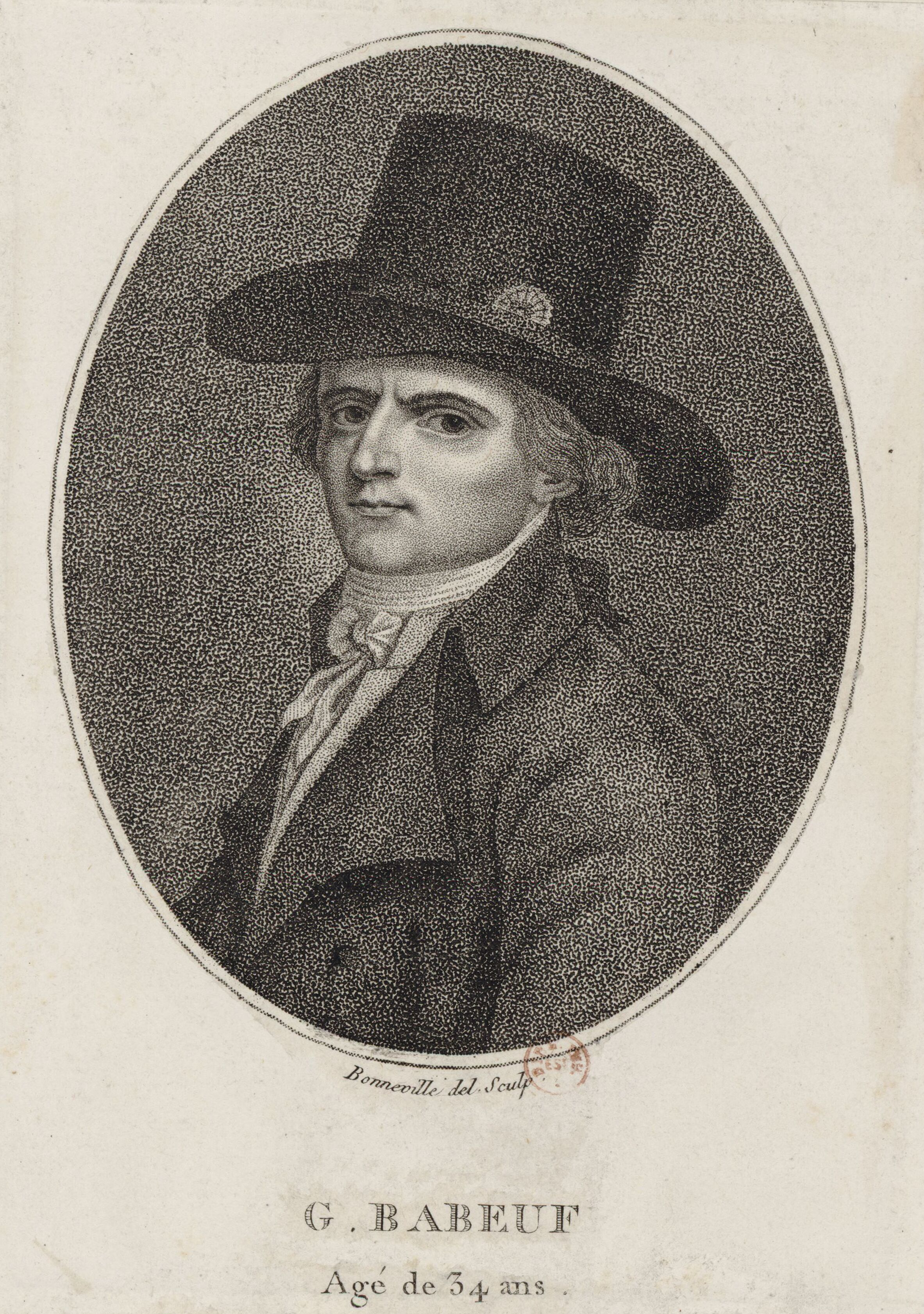
A 1794 engraving of the French agitator and revolutionary, François-Noël "Gracchus" Babeuf. Babeuf also wrote a newspaper called Le tribun du peuple (Tribune of the People). Babeuf was executed in 1797 for attempting to overthrow the French Directory.

Views of the Gracchi have changed over time. In the ancient world, the two brothers were largely viewed as an organised force acting in concert. During the early modern period, the Gracchan land programme was widely misconstrued as a socialistic restructuring of Roman society where public and private land ownership would be capped. Modern historians, however, largely view the two brothers' political activities as separate and dismiss their identification as social revolutionaries.

=== Ancient reception ===
There was a positive and a negative tradition related to the Gracchi brothers. Many of the ancient sources are late – there is a lack of contemporary sources – and are coloured by the positive tradition: many scholars believe that Plutarch's biographies of the two men, along with Appian's Civil wars, are largely based on Gaius Gracchus and his supporters' narratives; in this, most of what is known of Tiberius is filtered through his brother's self-presentation. Plutarch's narrative, guided by his literary agenda, "drastically simplifies the [complex] history of this period". On the whole, Appian's narrative is more reliable, but is still marred with significant anachronisms, clear inaccuracies, and schematic features – that the agrarian reform eventually fails and that Tiberius and Gaius pursued the same objectives – which emerge from Appian's historiographical agenda.

Some modern scholars speculate that these Gracchan narratives were transmitted through the centuries to the imperial authors by plays which dramatised the tragedy of their deaths. Two major themes stand out. First, the circumstances of Gaius' death are unclear and accounts are conflicting; it involved a Lucius Vitellius, which was a common name during the republic for traitors (according to legend, the Vitellii were the first to betray the republic to the Tarquins shortly after the expulsion of the kings). Second, the stress on friendship and betrayal in these last hours is seen as replacing a more anodyne political drama for heightened pathos. Other scholars, however, disagree, arguing that the hypothesis of lost tragedies is too speculative and instead credit Plutarch or his sources with the dramatisation of the narrative. Regardless, in later generations, the death of the Gracchi became a common rhetorical topos in Roman oratorical schools.

The negative tradition, however, is transmitted through other sources, such as Cicero and Valerius Maximus. In these narratives, the Gracchi are painted as seditious tribunes who inaugurated the use of force and intimidation which then required the Roman state to use violence to re-establish order. The confluence of these traditions was common in late republican politics. For example, Cicero modulated his opinions on the Gracchi brothers to meet his audience. Before the senate, he spoke of them negatively and focused on their alleged attempts to take over the republic; before the people, he instead praised their good faith, moral virtues, and quality as orators (especially in comparison to the popularis tribunes of his day).

=== Modern reception ===
By the 17th and 18th centuries, many books on ancient history repeated a false notion that Rome had limited men to only 500 jugera of land in general. The incorrect understanding emerged in 1734 with the publication of Montesquieu's Considerations on the causes of the greatness of the Romans and their decline, which furthered this mistaken notion of large scale land reform rather than redistribution of state-owned lots. This led to the characterisation of the Gracchi as "socialists". Through the later 18th century, the waters became further muddied; however an accurate understanding of the Gracchan effort to restrict specifically public land holdings to 500 jugera was largely reestablished by Barthold Georg Niebuhr in his History of Rome.

During the French Revolution, the revolutionary François-Noël Babeuf named himself "Gracchus" after the Gracchi brothers, in an attempt to connect his desire for large scale land redistribution with the Gracchan programme for agrarian reform. Babeuf's plans, however, differed substantially from the Gracchan programme in ways that exemplify how the reception of the Gracchi had deviated from their actual historical policies. First, Babeuf envisioned the nationalisation and communal ownership of lands, which was incompatible with the Gracchan programme of privatising already state-owned lands. Second, Babeuf's choice of name was made under the prevailing assumption at the time that the Gracchi acted to place a limit on private land holdings. Finally, Babeuf's name demonstrated his belief that a comparison was apt, consistent with contemporary beliefs that the Gracchi were revolutionaries. However, "the truth of the matter was otherwise[:] the Gracchi sought to strengthen and uphold the Roman republic; Babeuf wished to overthrow and radicalise the French republic".

During the 19th century, the use of the Gracchi in then-current politics continued. The process of enclosure in England, for example, led to the formation of a large body of poor urban workers; many of their leaders were likened to the Gracchi and proposed reforms were compared with reference to the Roman land crisis as described in the ancient sources.

Some 19th and early 20th century scholarship argued that the Gracchi were to some extent influenced by Greek political philosophy, especially in the extent to which Greek democratic principles could be applied at Rome. These influences are largely attributed to Tiberius' interactions with Stoic egalitarian philosophy through Blossius of Cumae. This is no longer believed, however, as there is little evidence for Tiberius being a Stoic or for Stoicism justfying democratic policies.

== See also ==
- Land reform in the Roman republic
