= Oil =

Viscous water-insoluble liquid

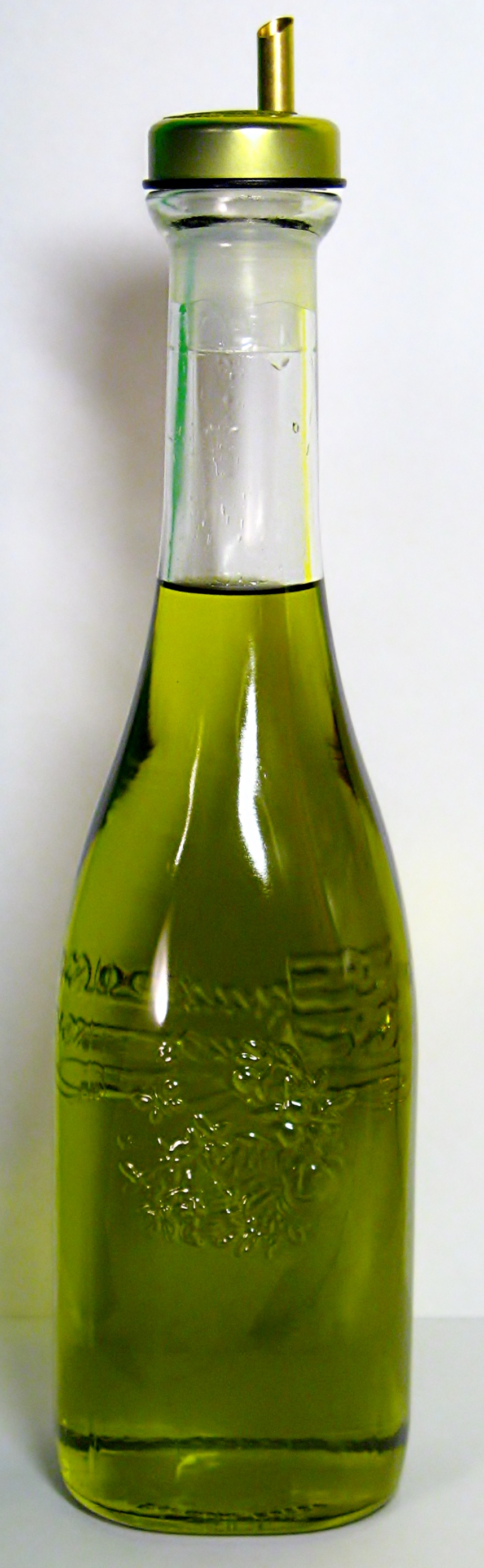
A bottle of olive oil used in food

Oil is a liquid with varying degrees of viscosity depending on temperature. Oil is any nonpolar chemical substance that is composed primarily of hydrocarbons and is hydrophobic and lipophilic. Oils are usually flammable and surface active. Most oils are unsaturated lipids that are liquid at room temperature.

== Plant and animal oils ==
Diverse oils are produced by plants, animals, and other organisms. Lipid is the scientific term for the fats, steroids, and phospholipids that are soluble in organic solvents. Another large class of plant oils are tall oils, mixtures of fats and rosins that are extracted from trees and used mainly as solvent and fuel. In addition to modern animal-derived oils (e.g. tallow), whale oil was once widely used.

From the perspective of commercial applications, fats are broadly significant because they are precursors to soaps and are a component of many foods, e.g. cooking oils. Drying oils, consisting of highly unsaturated fats, are key components of some paints and lacquers.

== Petroleum-derived oils ==
Several sources of "petroleum-derived" oils exist including distillates from crude oil and shale oil. Major uses of these oils include fuels (e.g. heating oil), hydraulic fluids, transformer oil, and heat-transfer fluids.

Additionally, synthetic oils, mainly used as lubricants, are produced by chemical processing of petrochemicals.

Petroleum-based oils originate from ancient fossilized organic materials, such as zooplankton and algae, which geochemical processes have converted into oil.

== Etymology and history ==
(Note: The Old English word was: ele; "Eft on fyrste, æfter Cristes upstige to heofonum, rixode sum wælhreow casere on Romana ríce, æfter Nerone, se wæs Domicianus gehaten, cristenra manna ehtere: se het afyllan ane cyfe mid weallendum ele," (in: IV of Homilies written by Ælfric)) First usage in a form resembling the modern is in Anglo-Norman before (a)1300 in Land of Cokaygne (Note: Þer beþ riuers..Of oile, melk, honi and wine. In Cokaigne is met and drink, With-vte care, how and swink.... Ther beth riuers gret and fine Of oile, melk, honi and wine. "riuers": "The four rivers of Paradise" of which oil is Geon because of the Apocalypse of St Paul) in Middle English from Old French oile as a consequence of influence of Edward the Confessor (1042–1066) and after the killing of King Harold on 14 October 1066 after the 1066 invasion from Normandy, the earliest extant source a translation from Latin during the 12th or 13th century (Marbode Lapidaire) from Classical Latin oleum, (the earliest extant source being: Plautus, Poenulus) (Note: Latin language sources chronology: BCE / BC: Plautus, Poenulus (c. 200) Cato the Elder, (234–149) (Tusculum) De Agri Cultura (c. 160) Lex Thoria (111) Varro, (116–27) (Reate) De Re Rustica Cicero (106, Arpinum) Virgil, (October 15, 70, Andes) Aeneid Horace, (December 8, 65) Saturae Ovid, (March 20, 43) Tristia CE / AD: Columella, (70 AD) De Re Rustica Pliny the Elder, (23 CE Transpadane Gaul - August 24, 79, Stabiae) Naturalis Historia Juvenal, (AD 80, Aquinum) Saturae) which in turn comes from the Greek ἔλαιον (elaion), "olive oil, oil" and that from ἐλαία (elaia), "olive tree", "olive fruit". "Olive oil" in Mycenaean Greek (transliteration) is e-rai-wo.

Oil has been used throughout history as a religious medium. It is often considered a spiritually purifying agent and is used for anointing purposes. As a particular example, holy anointing oil has been an important ritual liquid for Judaism and Christianity.

== See also ==
- Emulsifier, a chemical which allows oil and water to mix
