= Land reform in the Roman republic =

Summary of proposed agrarian reforms

Land reform in the Roman republic was a system first attempted in the Roman Republic in 486 BC under the consulships of Spurius Cassius Vecellinus, and Proculus Verginius Tricostus Rutilus.

== Cassius and Verginius ==
The first attempted land reforms in the Roman Republic occurred in 486 BC under the consulship of Spurius Cassius Vecellinus, and Proculus Verginius Tricostus Rutilus. After winning a war against the Hernici to the south, the consul Cassius attempted to pass a bill granting two-thirds of the Hernicians' land to the plebs, and Latin allies, with one half going to each. This bill would take some land owned by patricians and place it under public domain. The patricians immediately opposed this bill. Livy states this was the first and only proposal of land reform which did not immediately throw Rome into violence. The consul Verginius opposed this bill, and subsequently backed by the patricians.

Now both consuls, backed by plebeian and patrician alike, vied for the neutral body of Romans. Verginius hurled accusations that Cassius was a secret ally of the Hernicians by allowing them to keep 1/3 of their lands.

Verginius proposed the land be distributed only among the Roman citizens, and none should go to the Latin allies who assisted in taking it. Cassius replied by promising to give the Romans whatever Sicilian corn they received for free, yet this was seen as a bribe and only raised their suspicions of him. This move ruined his reputation and marked him for death.

In 485 BC, Cassius' and Verginius' terms ended as consuls. Cassius was put to death. He was charged with treason by two quaestors, Caeso Fabius and Lucius Valerius. He was found guilty of this charge by the people and his house was burned to the ground.

=== Outcomes ===
The plebeians quickly forgot about the land they had yet to receive when the patrician senate halted payment to the soldiers who fought in the following war against the Volscians and Æquans. The land was sold off by the consul Quintus Fabius and most likely bought up by the wealthier patrician class. This event planted the seeds for hundreds of years of plebeian-patrician antagonism.

== Gracchi reforms ==
The Gracchi reforms were land reforms attempted in the Roman Republic in the 2nd century BC. They are explained in detail in the following articles:

- Tiberius Gracchus – the tribune who initiated the reforms in 133 BC, but was murdered by the Senate.
- Gaius Gracchus – his brother, who tried to resume Tiberius' reforms in 123 BC, but was also murdered in 121.

The agrarian reform law required the transfer of land from the wealthy landowners to Rome's poorer citizens.

=== Outcomes ===
The Gracchian reform had no permanent effect, for they did nothing to change the conditions giving rise to land concentration in the first place. Some of the reform laws were soon repealed, while others continued but with weakened effects over time. Land problems plagued the Romans for all times thereafter.

Appian adds that within 15 years, all of the progress done under the Gracchi had been overturned and the poor were in a much worse position than ever before, many reduced to unemployment.

== Servilius Rullus ==
Under Cicero's term as Consul in 63 BC, Servilius Rullus proposed a land reform bill. Cicero opposed this and the Senate voted it down.

== Caesar ==
During Julius Caesar's first day as Consul in 59 BC, he proposed a bill similar to Rullus'. This is detailed in the article about the First Triumvirate.

== Media ==
- BBC, Ancient Rome: The Rise and Fall of an Empire, Episode 4, 2006, television series and accompanying book of same title (also as a The Gracchus Brothers Legacy - YouTube movie).
