= Lex Appuleia agraria =

Roman agrarian law of 100 BC

The lex Appuleia agraria was a Roman agrarian law introduced by the plebeian tribune Lucius Appuleius Saturninus during his second tribunate in 100 BC. The law concerned the distribution of land to poor Romans and to Gaius Marius' veterans. According to Appian, this was to be provided from land that had been seized by the Cimbri in Transalpine Gaul. A separate but related law also established colonies Sicily, Achaea, Macedonia, and possibly Africa.

The law also required the swearing of an oath to follow it. Some senators, including Quintus Caecilius Metellus Numidicus, refused to take the oath and therefore departed into exile. Although Saturninus was an ally of Marius, his activities during the elections of 100 BC – including a murder of a hostile candidate – triggered a senatus consultum ultimum which saw him apprehended and his death to a mob in the senate house. Despite Saturninus' death, his land reforms were not overturned.

== Provisions ==
According to Appian, the law provided for the distribution of land which had been seized by the invading Cimbri in Cisalpine Gaul prior to their defeat by Gaius Marius at the Battle of Vercellae (101 BC). This land was to be allocated to poor citizens, especially Marius' veterans. According to Pseudo-Aurelius Victor, Saturninus sent colonists to the Roman provinces of Sicily, Achaea, and Macedonia. Velleius Paterculus stated that the colony of Epodeia was founded in northwestern Italy by Marius during his sixth consulship (100 BC). Lucius Annaeus Seneca and Pliny the Elder write that Marius founded a colony in Corsica; Pliny adds that its name was Mariana. The two writers did not specify when this occurred, but it is likely that this was also a result of the law.

Appian wrote that the law assigned the larger share to the Italian allies. Presumably these were to be mainly allied veterans who had served under Marius.

The law provided that Marius should have authority to make three Roman citizens in every colony.

Another provision required that the senators should take an oath to obey the law within five days and anyone who refused to do so should be expelled from the Senate and pay a fine of twenty talents for the benefit of the people.

== Political conflict ==
The provision that the Italian allies were to be assigned the larger share of the land angered Rome's urban poor, who caused a disturbance at the meeting of the assembly which was to vote on the bill in an attempt to prevent the passage of the law. Saturninus had called in people from the rural districts, many of whom were Marius' veterans, to support him. They dispersed the urban people with clubs. The latter claimed that a thunder was heard during the assembly. According to Roman tradition, this was a bad omen which would require the business of the day to be brought to a close. Saturninus ignored this.

Marius wanted to use the provision regarding the oath against Quintus Caecilius Metellus Numidicus, his enemy. He declared that he would not take the oath. Metellus agreed and the other senators approved. On the fifth day Marius hastily convoked the Senate late in the day. He claimed that he was afraid of the reaction of the people if they did not take the oath and proposed a stratagem. He said if they took the oath to obey the law insofar at it was a law, the country people would disperse. Afterwards they could show that this law was not really a law because it had been enacted by violence and after thunder had been reported.

While the senators were confused and silent, Marius took quick action before they had time to think: He gave his oath publicly. The other senators followed suit, fearing for their safety. However, Metellus refused. The next day Apuleius' officers tried to drag him out of the senate-house, but the other tribunes defended him. The country people were brought back into town. They were told that the law would not be executed, and they would not get their land, unless Metellus were banished. A banishment decree was proposed. On ratification day the urban people carried knives and escorted Metellus to protect him. Metellus decided to leave the city rather than risk a conflict. Apuleius had the decree ratified.

Later in the same year, Saturninus got into political trouble and was lynched by an angry crowd. The Senate and the people called for the recall of Metellus. Publius Furius, another plebeian tribune, opposed this. However, he, too, was lynched and Metellus was allowed to return.

== See also ==
- Agrarian law
- Marian reforms
- List of Roman laws
- Plebeian tribune
- Roman Law

== Bibliography ==
=== Modern sources ===
- Badian, Ernst (2012). "Appuleius Saturninus, Lucius". In Hornblower, Simon; et al. (eds.). The Oxford classical dictionary (4th ed.). Oxford University Press. doi:10.1093/acrefore/9780199381135.013.624. ISBN 978-0-19-954556-8. OCLC 959667246.
- Broughton, Thomas Robert Shannon (1951). The magistrates of the Roman republic. Vol. 1. New York: American Philological Association.
- Flower, Harriet I., ed. (2014). The Cambridge companion to the Roman republic (2nd ed.). Cambridge University Press. ISBN 978-1-107-03224-8.
- Kim, Y C (2016). Roman agrarian policies and the Italian countryside 133–91 BC (DPhil thesis). University of Oxford.
- Roselaar, Saskia T (2010). Public land in the Roman Republic : a social and economic history of ager publicus in Italy, 396-89 BC. Oxford: Oxford University Press. ISBN 978-0-19-957723-1. OCLC 520714519.

=== Ancient sources ===
- Aurelius Victor. De Viris Illustribus (Latin), CreateSpace Independent Publishing Platform, 2014; ISBN 978-1505688788
- Appian (1913) [2nd century AD]. Civil Wars. Loeb Classical Library. Translated by White, Horace. Cambridge – via LacusCurtius.
- Seneca, Of a Happy Life (Annotated) (Dialogues of Seneca), Independently published, 2018; ISBN 978-1729289167
- Pliny the Elder, Natural History, Penguin Classics, Reprint edition,1991; ISBN 978-0140444131
- Plutarch (1920) [2nd century AD]. "Life of Marius". Parallel Lives. Loeb Classical Library. Vol. 9. Translated by Perrin, Bernadotte. Harvard University Press. OCLC 40115288 – via Perseus Digital Library.
- Velleius Paterculus (1924). Roman History. Loeb Classical Library. Translated by Shipley, Frederick W. Harvard University Press – via LacusCurtius.
