= Lex Sempronia agraria =

The Lex Sempronia agraria was a Roman agricultural law (lex agraria) proposed by the plebeian tribune Tiberius Gracchus. Passed in 133 BC, it created a three-man commission to allot state-owned land across Italy to poor citizens. The lands so given came with some conditions, such as payment of a vectigal (a rent or property tax) and registration in the census, for purposes of conscription.

The purpose of the law was to halt a perceived decline in the number of free citizens. Such depopulation would have hollowed out the pool of Roman conscripts and was attributed to the emergence of large slave-run estates. Modern archaeology suggests, however, that the decline in the free population (as reported in Roman censuses) emerged more from a desire to evade conscription than from an actual decline in the population.

Regardless, the commission was successful in distributing a large amount of land, some of which is archaeologically attested in boundary stones. After 129 BC, however, the commission was stripped of land survey jurisdiction, which was necessary to determine which lands could be allocated. Its work therefore largely stalled until Gaius Gracchus, as plebeian tribune in 123–22 BC, re-enacted the law with explicit surveying jurisdiction. Work continued under various agrarian laws through the following decades. But the activities of the commission and its successors likely contributed to the outbreak of the Social War since the public land being distributed was already being used by Rome's subject allied communities and, when allotted, had to be taken from them.

== Background ==
=== Public land in the second century ===
Roman land – the ager Romanus – around 133 BC. In red are public lands held prior to the Second Punic War. Those in yellow were acquired after victory over the southern Italian allies who defected during the conflict.

When Tiberius Gracchus became a tribune in the late 130s BC, the Roman population faced a number of economic issues: wage labour was scarce due to a dearth of public building, grain prices were likely high due to the ongoing slave rebellion in Sicily, population growth meant there were more mouths to feed, and declining willingness to serve on long army campaigns had increased migration to the cities. Altogether, these trends reduced urban workers' incomes, driving them closer to subsistence. Most of the population remained outside the cities in the countryside but similar issues plagued the rural poor as well. The end of colonisation projects caused an oversupply of rural free labour, driving down wages.

The Roman state owned a large amount of public land (ager publicus) acquired from conquest, and there were two competing uses - to provide revenue to the state and to provide relief to the poorer citizens. The state, however, did not exploit this land heavily. While it was theoretically Roman property, Rome had allowed allies to work and enjoy it after its de jure seizure. In the traditional story, derived from Appian and Plutarch (two historians writing during the imperial period), the ager publicus had been occupied by rich landowners operating large latifundia staffed largely by slaves, driving poor farmers into destitution between military service and competition with slave labour. This narrative is both incompatible with two republican censuses and the ancient necessity for productive lands to be close to market. Illegal occupation of the ager publicus for commercial production was unlikely due to the ager's inaccessibility by urban markets; if displacement consistent with the ancient sources happened, it likely occurred only in farmlands areas close to Rome. Slave-staffed estates, the driver for displacement in that narrative, also did not become common until the first century BC, after the lex Sempronia agraria.

It is more likely that the expanded population of Italy through the second century BC had led to greater demands for land redistribution and pressure on food supplies. Due to partible inheritance, modest farms had become divided into plots too small to feed a family. This led to underemployment of farmers; close to Rome, where demand for land was high, those farmers sold their lands to richer men and engaged in wage labour, which was a major source of employment around harvest time. Some of those farmers also found wage work in the cities, such as jobs in public works, itinerant manual labour, and selling food; their material livelihoods declined, however, after 140 BC when a pause in monumental building projects caused wage rates to fall.

Alternate occupations included the army, but by the late 130s BC, army life was hard; the plunder of the early 2nd century's armies had ended and Rome was instead engaged in sanguinary and unprofitable wars in Hispania. There are many contemporaneous reports of endemic desertion, draft evasion, and poor morale. A recent census also recorded a fall in Rome's population and, therefore, the number of leviable citizens; modern archaeology, however, has shown that this apparent decline was illusory. Nobody at the time connected unwillingness to serve in Spain with evasion of conscription by avoiding censorial registration. The Romans eventually righted their census undercount in the census of 125/4 BC, which showed the population had actually increased.

=== Political context ===
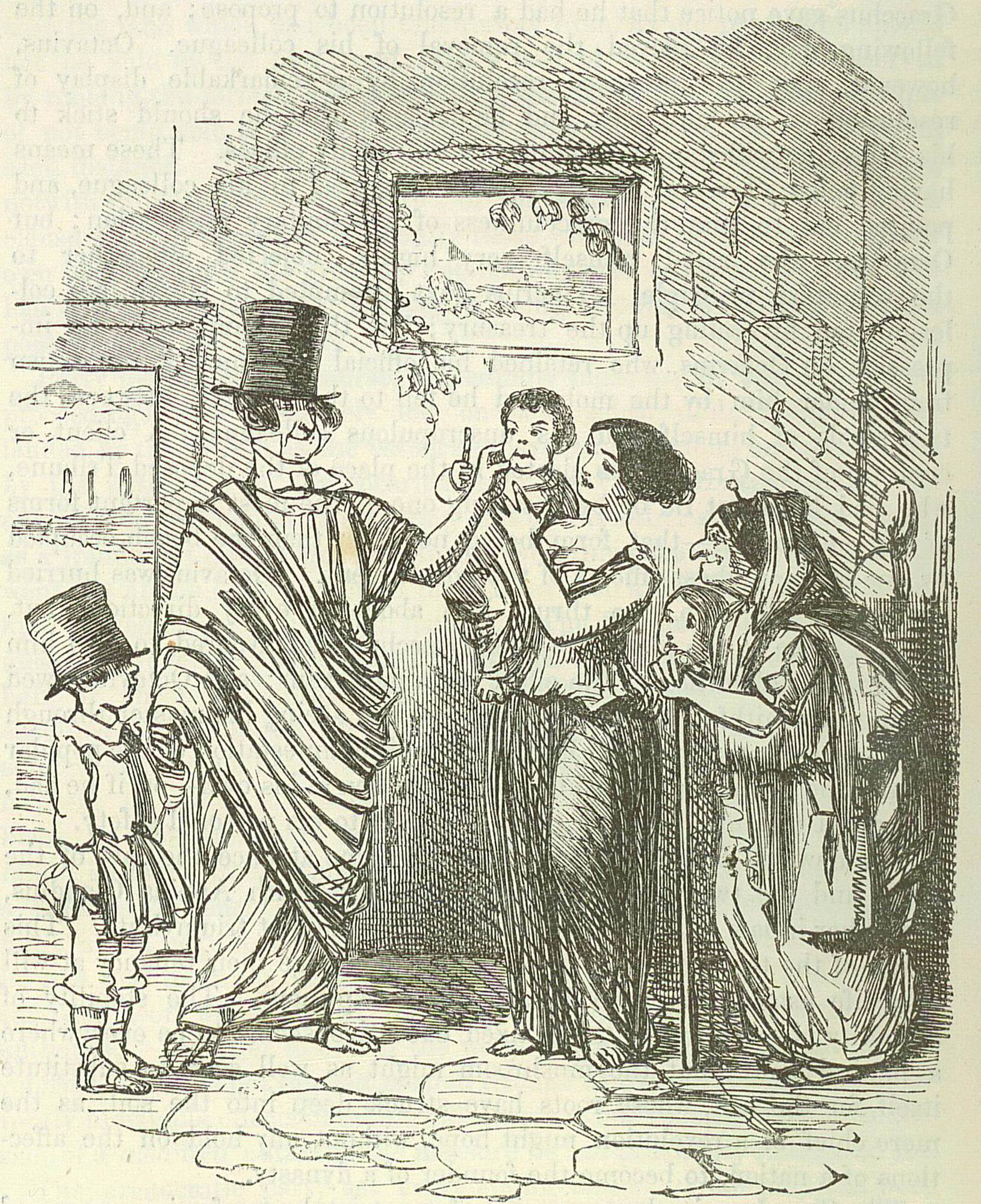
Tiberius Gracchus canvassing. Image by John Leech, from The Comic History of Rome by Gilbert Abbott à Beckett. The top hat worn by Tiberius is a deliberate anachronism intended to compare him to 19th-century British politicians.

Due to the substantial demand among the poor for land redistribution Tiberius enjoyed unprecedented levels of popularity in bringing the matter before the assemblies. Tiberius' unwillingness to stand aside or compromise broke with political norms. A similar land reform proposal by Gaius Laelius Sapiens during his consulship in 140 BC was withdrawn after bitter opposition and its defeat in the senate.

Moreover, victory on the matter of the lex agraria would have, for Tiberius, won him considerable support among the people and buttressed his prospects for higher office. His refusals to compromise or withdraw his proposals led to suspicion among the elite that the bill was for his personal and familial political interests instead of his stated objectives. The complex motives of Tiberius and his ally and father-in-law Appius Claudius Pulcher were not limited to pro-natalist policymaking and its concomitant effects for army levies; they also may have calculated that land distributions would co-opt the loyalties of the soon-to-return Numantine war veterans. Passage would have served to balance against Aemilianus' political influence – he was the commander in the final campaign of the Numantine war – after his expected victory.

Tiberius believed that a previous law – commonly identified by modern scholars as the Licinio-Sextian rogations of the early fourth century BC – had limited the amount of public land that any person could hold to 500 jugera (approximately 120 hectares). This legal maximum on land holdings, if it actually existed, was largely ignored and many people possessed far more than the limit, including Marcus Octavius, also serving as tribune in that year, and Publius Cornelius Scipio Nasica Serapio, then pontifex maximus.

The accounts of Appian and Plutarch are largely based on Tiberius and his supporters' political rhetoric and argumentation. Modern scholars have argued that those arguments were tendentious and did not reflect contemporaneous conditions objectively. Source difficulties also emerge, inasmuch as some modern scholars also doubt whether the Gracchan narratives in Plutarch and Appian are based more on tragic dramas about their deaths rather than credible historical narratives.

According to Plutarch, referencing a pamphlet attributed to Tiberius' brother Gaius, Tiberius developed his measures after being moved by the dearth of free Italians tilling the fields in Etruria on the march to the Numantine war. The poor, without land, became unavailable for military service and stopped reproducing, causing population decline. A quote from Tiberius Gracchus is preserved in Plutarch:

The wild beasts that roam over Italy... have every one of them a cave or lair to lurk in; but the men who fight and die for Italy enjoy the common air and light, indeed, but nothing else; houseless and homeless they wander about with their wives and children. And it is with lying lips that their [commanders] exhort the soldiers in their battles to defend sepulchres and shrines from the enemy; for not a man of them has an hereditary altar, not one of all these many Romans an ancestral tomb, but they fight and die to support others in wealth and luxury, and though they are styled masters of the world, they have not a single clod of earth that is their own.

To resolve what he identified as the problem, Tiberius proposed a lex agraria to enforce a limit on the amount of public land that one person could hold; surplus land would then be transferred into the hands of poor Roman citizens. Benefitting the poor was not the only goal of his legislation: Tiberius also intended to reduce the level of inflammation in the city by moving the poor into the countryside while also endowing those people with the necessary land to meet army property qualifications and reverse apparent population decline.

This agrarian policy, focusing on people with agricultural skills, led to much of his support coming from the poor rural plebs rather than the plebs in the city. Thousands reportedly flooded in from the countryside to support Tiberius and his programme. Tiberius was not, however, alone in his views: he was supported by one of the consuls for the year (the jurist Publius Mucius Scaevola), his father-in-law Appius Claudius Pulcher (who had served as consul for 143 BC), Publius Licinius Crassus Mucianus (elected pontifex maximus the next year), and other younger, junior senators.

The amount of land each beneficiary would have received is unknown. Thirty jugera is often suggested. That amount, however, is greatly in excess of the regular amount of land distributed viritim in colonisation programmes (only 10 jugera). There were also restrictions on alienation and possibly rents (a vectigal). While these conditions place the private ownership of the distributed land into question, and therefore also question whether an owner could be registered in the census as owning that land. Later laws indicate that it was legally treated as private with tenure maintained given payment of the vectigal. An unpaid vectigal would trigger reverter to the state, which would then be able to redistribute it again.

The law would also create a commission, staffed following elections, by Tiberius Gracchus, his brother Gaius Gracchus, and his father-in-law, Appius Claudius Pulcher, to survey land and determine which illegally occupied land was to be seized for redistribution.

== Passage of the law ==
Those possessing more than 500 jugera of land opposed the law strongly. While previous laws had fined occupation in excess of the limit, those fines were rarely enforced and the land possession itself was not disturbed. This led them to invest into improvements to that land, with some protests that the land was part of wives' dowries or the site of family tombs. Tiberius Gracchus' law would seize the land explicitly, a novelty. According to Plutarch, Tiberius initially proposed compensation, but the compromise offer was withdrawn after opposition; his later proposal was to compensate by securing tenure over a cap of 500 jugera (with an additional 250 jugera for up to two sons).

The exact legislative history of the bill is disputed: Appian and Plutarch's accounts of the bill's passage differ considerably. At a broad level, the bill was proposed before the concilium plebis; Tiberius forwent the approval of the senate before a bill was to be introduced. In response, the senate secured one of his tribunician colleagues to veto the proceedings. Both versions agree on obstruction from Marcus Octavius, one of the other tribunes, and his deposition.

In Plutarch's account, Tiberius proposes a bill with various concessions, which is then vetoed by Marcus Octavius, one of the other tribunes. In response, he withdraws the bill and removes the concessions. This latter bill is the one debated heavily in the forum. Tiberius tries various tactics to induce Octavius to abandon his opposition: offering him a bribe and shutting down the Roman treasury, and thereby, most government business. When the Assembly eventually assembles to vote, a veto is presumed. They attempt to adjudicate the matter in the senate, to no avail, and the Assembly votes to depose Octavius from office when he maintains his veto. Following the deposition, Tiberius' freedmen drag Octavius from the Assembly and the Assembly passes the bill.

In Appian's account, however, there is only one bill: opposition from Octavius appears only at the final vote, leading to the dispute to be taken to the senate, and then Octavius' deposition followed by the bill's passage. Prior to the vote, Tiberius gives a number of speeches, in which Appian asserts that Tiberius passed the bill on behalf of all Italians.

When Tiberius was elected as plebeian tribune in 133 BC. the political culture in Rome at this time was a stable one - able to find solutions through negotiation, peer pressure, and deference to superiors. The political dispute between Tiberius and Octavius lacked clear resolution because of the unwritten Roman constitution's flexibility. The system, which worked best when magistrates worked cooperatively, broke down when magistrates exploited the legal extent of their powers fully and contrary to existing norms. Both men, being tribunes, represented the plebs and their interests. Octavius insisted on maintaining his veto against his constituents; Tiberius' response was to unconstitutionally depose Octavius. Tiberius had extra-constitutionally bypassed the senate by bringing the lex agraria without its consent; Octavius similarly extra-constitutionally attempted to obstruct the manifest will of the people by veto.

== Provisions ==
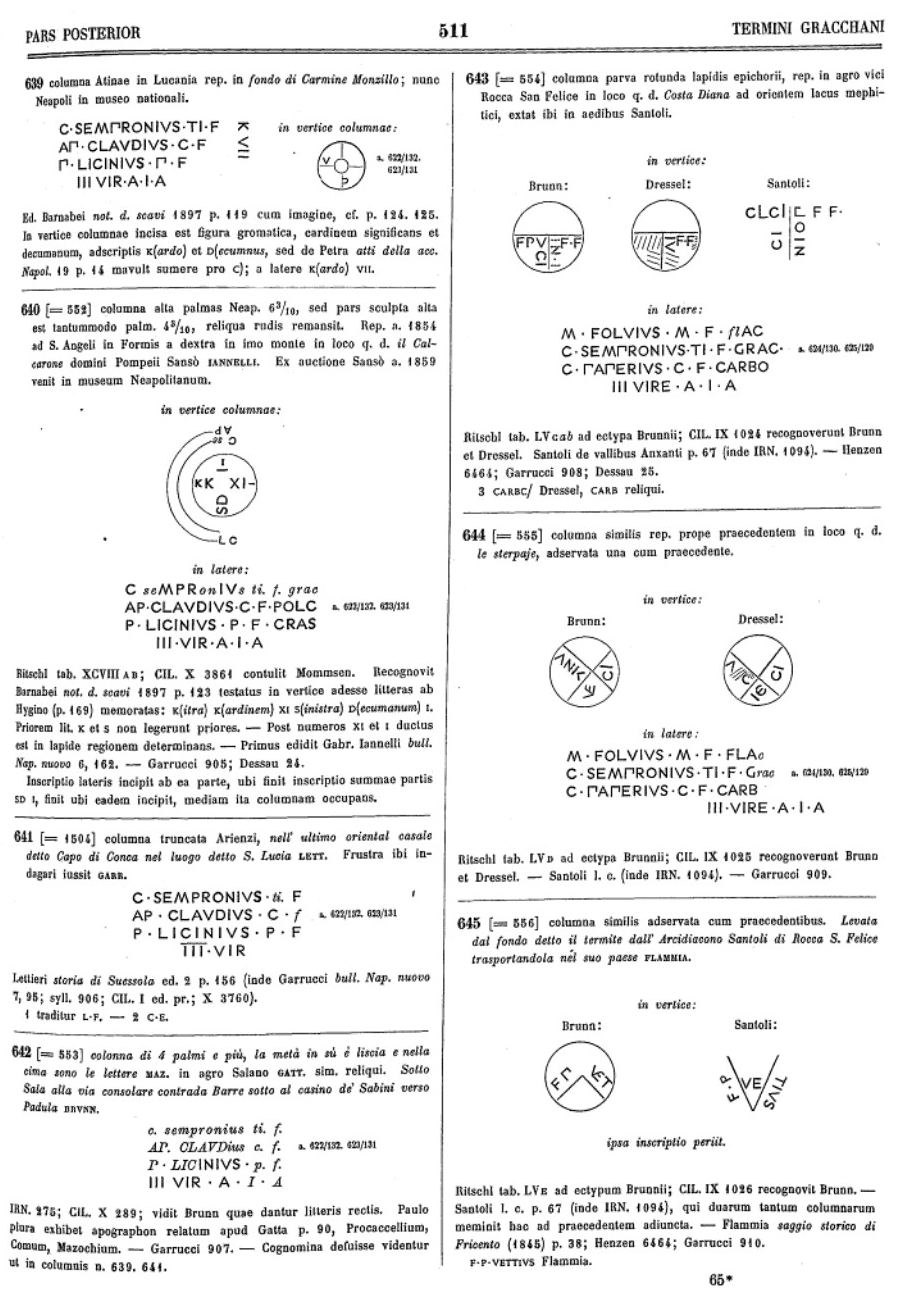
Diagrams, in the Corpus Inscriptionum Latinarum, of inscriptions left by the Gracchan land commission

The law provided for the creation of a three-man board to survey public lands and give them away in allotments with a nominal rent to poorer citizens. Scholars often suggest allotments of 30 jugera but the area was likely smaller. The purpose of the rent, called a vectigal, was to allow the state determine whether the land was abandoned and, if so, to redistribute it to another family. The land received also could not be alienated and was counted for the purposes of the property qualifications for military service. It had no impact on private land holdings and, contra Appian, did not distribute land to the Italian allies. The public lands to be distributed were to be found by revoking the usage rights of those who occupied more than 500 jugera of land (with the cap increased by 250 for each child until 1,000 jugera); in exchange, the remaining 500 jugera would be fully privatised under clear title into the hands of the current user.

The three-man board, titled triumviri agris iudicandis assignandis (three men for the assignment and surveying of agricultural land), was initially made up of Tiberius himself, his brother Gaius, and Appius Claudius Pulcher. After Tiberius' death at the hands of Publius Cornelius Scipio Nasica Corculum at the elections for the tribunate of 132 BC amid Tiberius' attempt to stand for a consecutive tribunate, his seat was filled by Publius Licinius Crassus. The authority of the triumvirs to survey land was severely restricted by a senatorial decree in 129 BC which found that the triumvirs' poor surveying practices were interfering in Rome's obligations to defend its allies' property rights; the authority to make judgements on land titles was consequently transferred to the consuls. The change hugely slowed the continued activities of the commission, as almost all the land not under dispute had already been distributed. Regardless, archaeological evidence implies that just between 133 and 129 BC the triumvirs distributed some 3,268 square kilometres of land (approximately 1.3 million jugera), concentrated in southern Italy and capable of supporting at least 15,000 households.

Gaius Gracchus, during his later tribunate, is recorded as having passed another land bill. This later bill, dating to 123 BC, likely re-enacted the earlier lex agraria while changing the type of lands that could be distributed and assigning the jurisdiction to settle land survey disputes with the triumvirs.

The activities of the Gracchan land commission are archaeologically documented on recovered boundary stones listing the members of the commission. With the find locations, scholars estimate distribution of more than 3,200 square kilometres of public lands, mostly concentrated in southern Italy.

== Opposition ==
After passage of the bill, the senate allocated very little money for the commissioners, making it impossible for the commission to do its job when it needed to pay for surveyors, pack animals, and other expenses. After this meagre allotment, however, news arrived that Attalus III of Pergamum had died and that he had bequeathed his treasury and devised his kingdom to Rome. Tiberius proposed using the bequest to finance the land commission, which triggered a wave of opposition. The ancient sources disagree on what the bequest would be used for: Plutarch asserts it was to be used to buy tools for the farmers, Livy's epitome asserts it was to be used to purchase more land for redistribution in response to an apparent shortage. The latter is unlikely, as the process of surveying and distribution were incipient; it is also possible the money was to be used to finance the commission itself.

After this proposal, Tiberius was attacked in the senate by Quintus Pompeius and accused of harbouring regal ambitions. One of the former consuls also brought a lawsuit against Tiberius arguing the deposition of Octavius violated magisterial collegiality and was a dangerous precedent which a sufficiently powerful tribune could exploit to bypass all checks on his power. Tiberius' proposal usurped senatorial prerogatives over finance and foreign policy, breaking a major political norm. Senators also feared that Tiberius intended to appropriate Attalus' bequest to hand out money to his personal benefit.

This was compounded by his attempt to stand for re-election, claiming that he needed to do so to prevent the law's repeal. Consecutive terms violated Roman constitutional norms and may have been illegal. and a mob killed him claiming it was to free the state from an incipient tyrant.

== See also ==
- Lex agraria (111 BC)

== Bibliography ==
=== Modern sources ===
- Badian, E (1979). "Review of "Tiberius Sempronius Gracchus: tradition and apostasy"". The American Journal of Philology. 100 (3): 452–458. doi:10.2307/293952. ISSN 0002-9475. JSTOR 293952.
- Beard, Mary (2015). SPQR: a history of ancient Rome (1st ed.). New York: WW Norton and Company. ISBN 978-0-87140-423-7. OCLC 902661394.
- Broughton, Thomas Robert Shannon (1951). The magistrates of the Roman republic. Vol. 1. New York: American Philological Association.
- Brunt, P A (1988). The fall of the Roman republic and related essays. Clarendon. ISBN 0-19-814849-6. OCLC 799090262.
- de Ligt, Luuk (2004). "Poverty and demography: the case of the Gracchan land reforms". Mnemosyne. 57 (6): 725–757. doi:10.1163/1568525043083541. ISSN 0026-7074. JSTOR 4433605.
- de Ligt, Luuk (2012). Peasants, citizens, and soldiers: studies in the demographic history of Roman Italy 225 BC – AD 100. Cambridge University Press. ISBN 978-1-107-01318-6. LCCN 2011032182.
- Flower, Harriet (2010). Roman republics. Princeton: Princeton University Press. ISBN 978-0-691-14043-8. OCLC 301798480.
- Goldsworthy, Adrian (2006). Caesar: life of a colossus. Yale University Press. ISBN 0-300-12048-6.
- Greenidge, Abel Hendy Jones (1911). "Agrarian Laws" . In Chisholm, Hugh (ed.). Encyclopædia Britannica (11th ed.). Cambridge University Press.
- Gruen, Erich S (1968). Roman politics and the criminal courts: 149–78 BC. Cambridge: Harvard University Press. LCCN 68-29179.
- Gruen, Erich S (1995). The last generation of the Roman republic. Berkeley: University of California Press. ISBN 0-520-02238-6. OCLC 943848.
- Hornblower, Simon; et al., eds. (2012). The Oxford classical dictionary (4th ed.). Oxford University Press. ISBN 978-0-19-954556-8. OCLC 959667246.
  - Badian, Ernst (2012a). "Sempronius Gracchus, Tiberius (3)". In OCD^{4} (2012).
- Lintott, Andrew (1994). "Political history, 146–95 BC". In Crook, John; et al. (eds.). The Cambridge ancient history. Vol. 9 (2nd ed.). Cambridge University Press. ISBN 0-521-85073-8. OCLC 121060.
- Mackay, Christopher S (2009). The breakdown of the Roman republic. Cambridge University Press. ISBN 978-0-521-51819-2.
- Mouritsen, Henrik (2017). Politics in the Roman republic. Cambridge University Press. ISBN 9781107031883.
- Potter, David (2014). "The Roman army and navy". In Flower, Harriet (ed.). The Cambridge companion to the Roman republic (2nd ed.). Cambridge University Press. ISBN 978-1-107-66942-0.
- Roselaar, Saskia (2010). Public land in the Roman Republic. Oxford University Press. ISBN 978-0-19-957723-1.
- Scullard, H H (1982). From the Gracchi to Nero. Taylor Francis. ISBN 0-415-02527-3.
- von Ungern-Sternberg, Jurgen (2014). "The crisis of the republic". In Flower, Harriet (ed.). The Cambridge companion to the Roman republic (2nd ed.). Cambridge University Press. ISBN 978-1-107-66942-0.
- Yakobson, Alexander (2010). "Traditional political culture and the peoples' role in the Roman Republic". Historia: Zeitschrift für Alte Geschichte. 59 (3). doi:10.25162/historia-2010-0017. ISSN 0018-2311. JSTOR 25758311. S2CID 160215553.

=== Ancient sources ===
- Appian. Bella civilia – via LacusCurtius.
- Plutarch. "Life of Tiberius Gracchus". Parallel lives – via LacusCurtius.
