= Jean-Baptiste Claude Eugène Guillaume =

French sculptor (1822–1905)

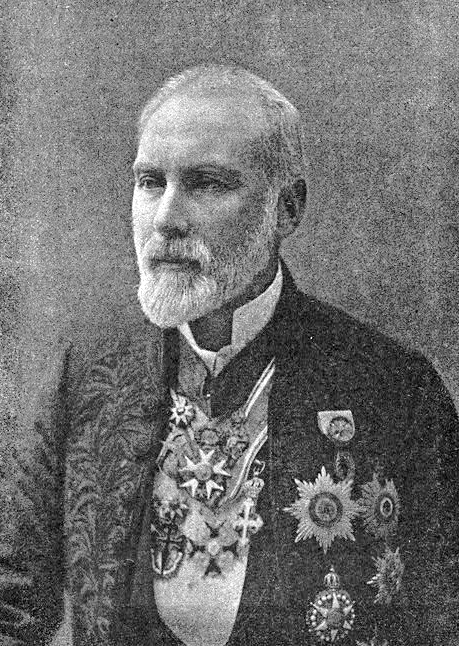
Eugène Guillaume Photograph by Eugène Pirou

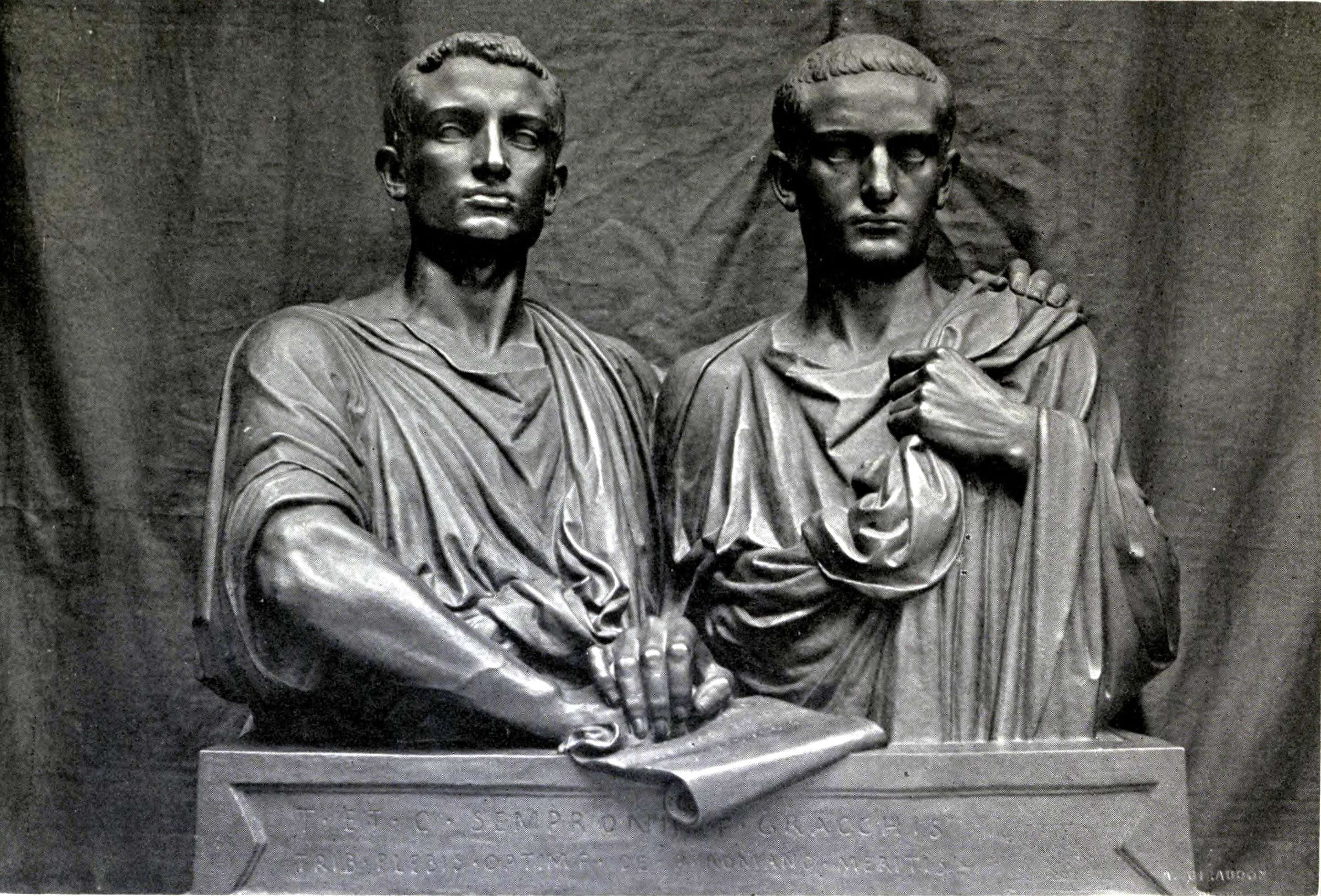
The Gracchi, Musée d'Orsay

Jean-Baptiste Claude Eugène Guillaume (4 July 1822, Montbard – 1 March 1905, Rome) was a French sculptor.

== Biography ==
He was born at Montbard on the Côte-d'Or. He studied under Cavelier, Millet, and Barrias, at the École des Beaux-Arts, which he entered in 1841, and where he gained the prix de Rome in 1845 with Theseus finding on a rock his father's sword. He became director of the École des Beaux-Arts in 1864, and director-general of Fine Arts from 1878 to 1879, when the office was suppressed.

Guillaume was a prolific writer, principally on sculpture and architecture of the Classic period and of the Italian Renaissance. He was elected member of the Académie française in 1898, and in 1891 was sent to Rome as director of the Académie de France in that city. He held this position until 1904. He was also elected an honorary member of the Royal Academy, London, 1869, on the institution of that class.

== Works ==
Many of his works have been bought for public galleries, and his monuments are to be found in the public squares of the chief cities of France. At Reims there is his bronze statue of Colbert, at Dijon his Rameau monument. The Musée du Luxembourg has his Anacreon (1852), Faucheur (1855), and the marble bust of Mgr Darboy; the Versailles Museum the portrait of Thiers; the Sorbonne Library the marble bust of Victor le Clerc, doyen de la faculté des lettres. Other works of his are at Trinity Church, Saint-Germain l'Auxerrois, and the church of St Clotilde, Paris. The Musée d'Orsay in Paris hosts Les Gracques (1853).
