= Lex agraria (111 BC) =

The lex agraria of 111 BC is an epigraphically-attested Roman law on the distribution and holding of public land (ager publicus). It dealt with the confirmation of private title to formerly public lands distributed by the Gracchan land commission in Italy, public lands given in exchange for other lands given up by allies, the imposition of a rent or property tax (vectigal) on such lands, and the future privatisation or use of public lands. It also had provisions relating to the letting out of Roman lands in the provinces of Africa (especially with regard to transition provisions related to an abortive colonisation programme near Carthage) and Greece.

There is substantial disagreement about where the epigraphically-attested lex agraria should fit in the Appianic literary narrative of Roman land reform and whether the law should be equated with the lex Thoria described in Appian and Cicero. A large portion of the law is preserved on fragments of a bronze plate, along with a separate law on the reverse side. This plate was discovered during the Renaissance and the fragments which survive are now stored in various museums. There have been multiple modern transcriptions of the bronze fragments, including one in the mid-19th century by Theodor Mommsen and two transcriptions in the 1990s by Andrew Lintott and Michael Crawford.

== Provisions ==
The law is dated to between 15 March 111 BC and the autumnal harvest of that year based on a line in the law referring to a future harvest, a future tax year, and to preceding magistrates in 115–112 BC.

The surviving portions have three sections, dealing with lands in Italy, Africa, and Greece, respectively. The third section, on Greece, unlike the other two sections, deals largely with some actions related to agricultural produce and settlement of disputes rather than land grants (except those near Corinth) per se.

=== Italian land ===
The portions relating to Italian land take as their start those lands present in 133 BC (the plebeian tribunate of Tiberius Gracchus) with exceptions as legislated by Gaius Gracchus. Lands held within the limits as prescribed by Gracchan legislation were fully confirmed. Lands given the Gracchan land commissions, both in rural allotments as well as towns and cities, were also confirmed to their possessors and made private with registration in the census. Lands given in exchange for other lands taken by the Gracchan land commissions were also confirmed.

In so doing, the possessors of public lands prior to 133 BC, the veteres possessores ("old possessors"), had their titles fully confirmed and made private, provided that their holdings complied with the holding limits established by statute. Moreover, because land exchanges had been done without clear title, the statute also fully confirmed the possessors' rights over lands given in exchange for prior possessions; such possessors were termed pro vetere possessore ("in [the same] place of old possessors"). A person who at the time of the law possessed no public land could also occupy, in the future, up to 30 jugera for agricultural purposes which would then be privatised as the occupier's property.

Some lands remained public and were exempted from distribution, including the lands given in usufruct for the upkeep of road maintainers, lands recently leased out by the censors, lands under long-term leases (especially in the ager Campanus), and the lands concessionarily leased in 200 BC in lieu of repayment of public debts incurred in 210 BC during the Second Punic War (the ager in trientabulis). Lands which had been made public, ie taken by the state, in the years between 133 and 111 BC were also confirmed as state property. Substantial amounts of land still available were pastures. The law of 111 BC also established that shared public pasture lands, termed ager compascuus, were not to be enclosed and that any person could graze a limited number of animals on such land without fee. Grazing more than that number of animals likely required payment to the state.

The allies, and especially those with Latin rights, who were legally non-Roman foreigners also were made legal owners of Roman public land if they received it in exchange for lands surrendered to Rome for colonial projects. Such lands were also made private and protected by law on the same terms as if the owners were Roman citizens. The land rights of foreigners, as given in prior treaties or laws unknown to modern scholars, were also confirmed.

There is some disagreement as to whether the law of 111 BC abolished or imposed a vectigal – a rent or property tax with forfeiture on failure to pay – on former public lands made private by land commission distribution.

=== Land in Africa and Greece ===
Rome had acquired land in Africa after its annexation of Carthaginian territories there following the Third Punic War in 146 BC. Lands in Africa which had been assigned pursuant to a previously repealed lex Rubria associated with Gaius Gracchus' reform project in 123–22 BC. The lex Rubria was brought by Gaius Rubrius who was plebeian tribune in 122 BC, but was repealed after Gaius Gracchus' death possibly as late as 119 BC. Archaeological evidence of centuriation in modern Tunisia suggests that substantial lands were distributed in Africa pursuant to the lex Rubria or later Caesarian or Augustan colonial programmes.

Lands allotted under the lex Rubria in Africa or otherwise sold between 115 and 113 BC were, provided that a declaration was made to duumviri appointed for that purpose and adjudged sufficient, confirmed subject to payment of a vectigal. Other mistakes in the distribution of the land, such as land promised but not assigned or lands taken by the Romans from their allies, were to be compensated for by the duumviri. Moreover, lands not previously assigned or confirmed to various groups – descendants of Carthaginian deserters, the sons of the Numidian king Massinissa, citizens of Utica, and peoples paying tribute to Rome (stipendarii), etc – were made Roman state property. Enforcement of the provisions also would be furthered by incentives given to informers with punishments for false reports and declarations.

The section on Greece is much less clear and largely relates to agricultural produce, leases, and building in that province. Some action was prescribed for the duumviri in relation to lands taken from Corinth but few details survive, though possibly some regulations were laid on the payment of taxes and some lands were surveyed.

== Interpretations ==
=== Appian's three laws and the lex Thoria ===
In the narrative given by Appian of post-Gracchan legislation, he presents three laws passed in the fifteen years after the laws of "Gracchus" with a first law allowing for alienation of allotments, a second law ending distributions and privatising the land subject to a vectigal (which Appian also calls the lex Thoria), and a third law abolishing that vectigal. It is not clear whether he meant Tiberius or Gaius. Various theories have equated the epigraphic lex agraria with the second or third law described in Appian: Saskia Roselaar in the 2010 book Public Land in the Roman Republic identified it as Appian's third law.

Michael Crawford, in the 1996 book Roman Statutes, argued that the epigraphic lex agraria of 111 BC should be identified as the lex Thoria passed by Spurius Thorius referenced in Cicero and as the second of the three Appianic laws. This identification, however, is not universally shared. Dominic Rathbone, for example, in a 2003 paper identified the epigraphic lex agraria with the first of the Appianic laws.

The presentation by Tommaso Beggio in the online edition of the Oxford Classical Dictionary set forth three camps: a first equating the epigraphic lex agraria with the third Appianic law; a second equating the epigraphic lex agraria with the third Appianic law and the lex Thoria; and a third equating the epigraphic lex agraria as the second Appianic law and as the lex Thoria.

=== Role in land reform ===
Appian's narrative cast post-Gracchan land legislation as a betrayal of the Gracchan programme which left the Roman poor impoverished. However, the provisions of the law and the archaeological evidence for prior distributions indicate that after the Gracchan tribunates, huge amounts of public land had been distributed or exchanged and were now the private property of freeholders. Much of the ager publicus that remained was of little agricultural value or was locked into long term leases. By covering and granting legal status to all persons now in possession of ager publicus in their varied categories, the law of 111 BC signalled the republic's intents both to recognise their private titles and plan for the future.

The growth of the population of Italy during the 2nd century, however, continued unabated. Demands for public lands into the future persisted but ran into the more pressing problem that Italy itself had no such lands to spare. Furthermore, the Gracchan land programmes had done little to disrupt the allies' centuries-long occupation of public lands in Etruria. Such occupation was likely illegal under the lex agraria of 111 BC and its Appianic cousins either on the basis of defective title or illegal enclosure of public pastures. Roman politicians also proposed a few attempts to distribute more lands: Lucius Marcius Philippus (plebeian tribune in 104 BC and later consul in 91 BC) gave a fiery speech denouncing wealth inequality noted by Cicero; Marcus Livius Drusus' plan to disrupt those holdings in 91 BC to make room for more Roman settlers generated substantial anger and may have played a role in the start of the Social War.

=== Role in extra-Italian land holdings ===
The lex agraria, by providing a sound basis for land right outside of Italy in Africa, may also have furthered the expansion of Roman commercial farming interests in the region and set a legal example for further such holdings outside Italy proper.

== Epigraphy ==
The lex agraria is preserved, along with a separate law called the lex repetundarum on judicial procedure, on fragments of a bronze plate (some 4 mm thick with inscribed letters between 5.5 and 8 mm tall) called the tabula Bembina. The bronze fragments are known to have resided first in the library of the Dukes of Urbino were gifted some time in the 16th century to Cardinal Pietro Bembo. The plates are separated into twelve fragments of which ten survive and preserved in multiple locations: the Museo Nazionale di Napoli and the Kunsthistorisches Museum in Vienna.

First published 1583 by Fulvio Orsini, the first important modern editions of the lex agraria date to the 19th century; it was included in the Corpus Inscriptionum Latinarum in 1863. Recent editions and English translations of the law include those of Andrew Lintott, published in 1992, and Michael Crawford, published in Roman Statutes in 1996.

== See also ==
- List of Roman laws

== Bibliography ==
=== Modern sources ===
- Beggio, Tommaso (2019-04-26). "lex agraria, 111 BCE". Oxford Classical Dictionary (Online ed.). doi:10.1093/acrefore/9780199381135.013.8267. ISBN 978-0-19-938113-5.
- Broughton, Thomas Robert Shannon (1951). The magistrates of the Roman republic. Vol. 1. New York: American Philological Association.
- Crawford, Michael Hewson; et al. (1996). Roman statutes. Bulleting of the Institute of Classical Studies Supplement 34. Institute of Classical Studies. ISBN 978-0-900587-69-6.
- Dart, Christopher J (2011). "The impact of the Gracchan land commission and the dandis power of the triumvirs". Hermes. 139 (3): 337–357. doi:10.25162/hermes-2011-0027. ISSN 0018-0777. JSTOR 23067319. S2CID 159905234.
- Kim, Yeong-Chei (2022). "Privatisation of ager in Africa from 123 to 63 BC". Classical Quarterly. 72 (2): 573–586. doi:10.1017/S0009838822000866. ISSN 0009-8388.
- Roselaar, Saskia T (2010). Public land in the Roman Republic : a social and economic history of ager publicus in Italy, 396-89 BC. Oxford: Oxford University Press. ISBN 978-0-19-957723-1. OCLC 520714519.

=== Ancient sources ===
- Appian (1913) [2nd century AD]. Civil Wars. Loeb Classical Library. Translated by White, Horace. Cambridge – via LacusCurtius.
