= Ager publicus =

Latin name for the public land of Ancient Rome

The ager publicus (Classical Latin: [ˈaɡɛr ˈpuːblɪkʊs]; lit. 'public land') is the Latin name for the state land of ancient Rome. It was usually acquired via the means of expropriation from enemies of Rome.

== History ==
In the earliest periods of Roman expansion in central Italy, the ager publicus was used for Roman and (after 338 BC) Latin colonies. Later tradition held that as far back as the 5th century BC, the patrician and plebeian classes disputed the rights of the rich to exploit the land, and in 367 BC two Plebeian Tribunes, Gaius Licinius Solo and Lucius Sextius Sextinus Lateranus promulgated a law which limited the amount of the ager publicus to be held by any individual to 500 iugera, roughly 325 acres (1.32 km^{2}).

In the half century following the Battle of Telamon (c. 225 BC), the Romans fully absorbed Cisalpine Gaul, adding huge swathes of land to the ager publicus, land which was more often than not given to new Latin colonies or to small freeholders. In the south of Italy, huge tracts of newly re-incorporated lands remained ager publicus, but tended to be leased out to wealthy citizens in return for rents (although these rents were usually not collected), often ignoring the Laws of 367. This led to the rapid growth of latifundia, huge estates worked by slaves.

Other ager publicus remained with the Italian allies from whom it had been confiscated. Tiberius Sempronius Gracchus attempted to address some of these violations in 133 BC in the Lex Sempronia agraria, by reimposing the limit of 500 iugera and distributing excess land to poor citizens. A similar move by his brother Gaius Sempronius Gracchus in 123 BC failed because of his death the following year. In 111 BC, a new law was passed which allowed individual smallholders to assume ownership of their part of the ager publicus.

But the resistance of the rich landowners made this law impotent and the result of the land reforms of the Gracchi was that rich Romans were left with their properties and were released from paying rent. In the Social War (91–87 BC) of Sulla the Ager Publicus received a vast increase by proscriptions and confiscations.

By the Imperial period, much of the ager publicus in Italy had been distributed to the veterans of generals such as Lucius Cornelius Sulla, Gaius Julius Caesar and Gnaeus Pompeius Magnus, so that all that remained were the properties of individual cities and common pasture lands. In the provinces, the ager publicus was huge, and came under the ownership of the emperor. However, in reality, almost all of it was under private occupation.

== See also ==
- Cursus publicus
- Sicaricon (Jewish law)
