= Gaius Gracchus =

Roman politician and reformer (c. 154 BC – 121 BC)

Gaius Sempronius Gracchus
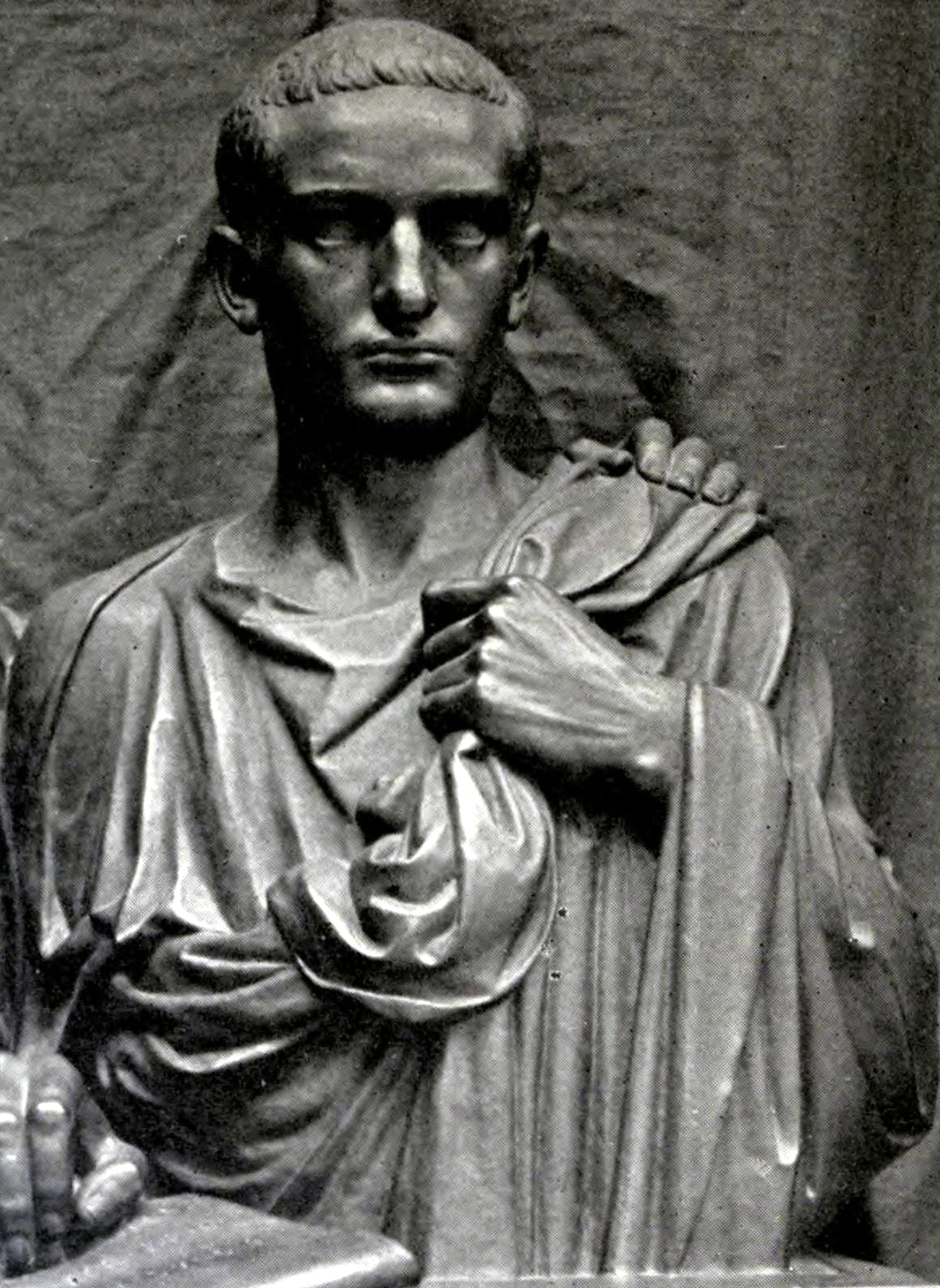
- A bust of Gaius from a 19th century commemorative sculpture of the Gracchi brothers by Eugène Guillaume
- Born: c. 154 BC
- Died: 121 BC (aged c. 33); Rome
- Occupations: Politician and soldier
- Office: III vir agris dandis assignandis (133–121 BC); Plebeian tribune (123–122 BC)
- Spouse: Licinia (daughter of Crassus)
- Parent(s): Tiberius Sempronius Gracchus and Cornelia
- Relatives: Tiberius Gracchus (brother); Sempronia (sister); Scipio Africanus (grandfather)
- Military career
- Rank: Military tribune and quaestor
- Wars: Numantine War (134–32 BC); Roman pacification of Sardinia (126–24 BC)

Gaius Sempronius Gracchus (c. 154 BC – 121 BC) was a reformist Roman politician and soldier who lived during the 2nd century BC. He is best known for his plebeian tribunates in 123 and 122 BC, during which he proposed a wide set of laws, including laws to establish colonies outside of Italy, engage in further land reform, reform the judicial system and system for provincial assignments, and create a subsidised grain supply for Rome.

The year after his tribunate of 122 BC, he and his political allies were implicated in political unrest and the armed occupation of the Aventine Hill at Rome. His political enemies used this unrest to declare martial law and march on his supporters, leading to his death either by suicide or in battle. After his death, his political allies were convicted in a series of trials, but most of his legislation was undisturbed.

His brother was the reformer Tiberius Sempronius Gracchus who was plebeian tribune in 133 BC and was also killed in political unrest that year. They were the sons of the Gracchus who was consul in 177 and 163 BC. The two brothers, known together as the Gracchi brothers, are often associated due to Gaius' own political self-representation and its transmission to contemporary times in Plutarch's Parallel Lives. The extent to which the two brothers should be associated and viewed as successors is disputed by modern scholars.

== Background ==
Gaius Gracchus was born into a very well-connected political family. His father, Tiberius Sempronius Gracchus, was a very successful politician of the 2nd century BC: he served in the consulships for 177 and 163 BC, and was elected censor in 169. He also had celebrated two triumphs during the 170s, one for the victorious establishment of a twenty-year-long peace in Spain.

His mother was Cornelia, daughter of Scipio Africanus, a noble woman who was a major influence on the Gracchi. As a widow, after the elder Gracchus' death, she refused the marriage proposal of Ptolemy VIII, the king of Egypt, preferring to devote her life to the upbringing of her sons.

Tiberius Gracchus, Gaius' elder brother, had through his marriage aligned the family with the Claudii Pulchri, despite his maternal connections to the Cornelii Scipiones, as the two families had a historic rivalry. It can be supposed, however, that both the Gracchi brothers would have come into contact with powerful members of both families.

== Early political career ==
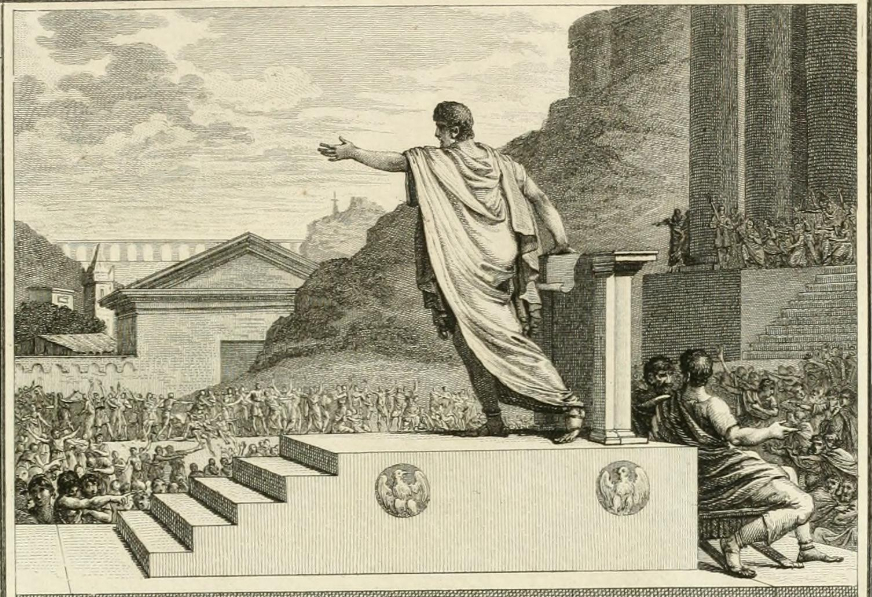
Depiction of Gaius addressing the concilium plebis.

Gaius Gracchus served in the Roman army under Scipio Aemilianus during the final campaign in the Numantine War in 133 BC. He may have held the military tribunate during his service there. During his elder brother Tiberius' tribunate, he started his political career with election as a commissioner in the Gracchan land commission to distribute public land to poor families.

In 126 BC, he supported Marcus Fulvius Flaccus' political programme. While in Rome, he opposed a proposed tribunician law to prohibit non-citizens from settling in Roman towns and evict those who had done so. He then was elected as quaestor and assigned to the Roman province of Sardinia to fight the rebels there under consul Lucius Aurelius Orestes.

During a harsh winter, Gracchus was successful in procuring supplies from the Sardinians for the hard-pressed Roman troops. Orestes' command in Sardinia was prorogued for a second time, extending it to the point where Gaius wanted to leave to continue his career. Plutarch reports, probably based on Gracchus' own statements, that the reason for his commander's prorogation was because the senate wanted to keep him away from Rome, an allegation which is "patently absurd": the reason for the prorogation was almost certainly because Orestes' campaign was not complete and Orestes wanted to win his triumph.

Gracchus, regardless, quit Sardinia and returned to the city early, without the permission of his commander. After his return, he was also interrogated by the censors on why he had quit his post: in response, he pleaded that he had already served longer than most, that he had a right to return after one year, and that his good character and services were more than sufficient: in effect, he "pleaded his right to be released as justification for releasing himself". He was later accused of aiding in an Italian revolt at Fregellae that had occurred in 125 BC, but was successful in rebutting the charges; well known to the people, he stood for election as tribune and won.

== Tribunate ==
Gaius was elected as one of the tribunes of the plebs for 123 BC. He embarked on an aggressive legislative programme immediately, aiming very broadly to appeal to many interest groups along with a "rousing style of public speaking that made him the greatest [Roman orator] between Cato the censor and Cicero".

Gaius also changed how speeches were delivered from the rostra. Formerly, when a speaker delivered a speech in the forum, he turned his face to the right in the direction of the curia, the senate house, and the comitium. Instead, Gaius would turn his face to the left, toward the direction of the Forum proper, effectively turning his back on the Senate. Gaius was also the first speaker to expose a shoulder whilst speaking in the Senate.

=== First tribunate (123 BC) ===
In his first year, as one of the tribunes for 123 BC, he proposed two initial measures: (1) a bill to prohibit any magistrate deposed by the people from standing again for office and (2) a law to reaffirm appeal to the people in capital cases which made transgressing magistrates liable for prosecution. The first bill was withdrawn at the request of his mother, Cornelia. Courts with capital punishment, not set up by the people, were now declared illegal ex post facto, which saw the former consul for 132 BC, Publius Popillius Laenas, driven into exile.

He then proposed a grain law establishing a maximum price of six and a third asses for a modius (about 8.7 litres), of grain and re-enacted Tiberius' law on agricultural land redistribution. The subsidised grain would be bought when prices were low and stored in public granaries; the price itself was "probably a little below the price fetched by wheat immediately after the harvest".

His elder brother's Lex Sempronia agraria had been successful: Gracchan boundary stones are found all over southern Italy, and suggest distribution of some 1.3 million jugera (or 3,268 square kilometres) of land, accommodating somewhere between 70 and 130 thousand settlers. The contents of Gaius' further land reform are less clear: "the sources are rather vague about the agrarian activities of Gaius". Mommsen asserted that he revitalised the commission by transferring to it jurisdiction over land disputes from the consuls, but of this there is no explicit evidence. The new law did clarify which land could be redistributed, however, and after his first year as tribune there are boundary stones (cippi) showing that he was successful in redistributing land around Apulia. He also probably carried laws authorising new Roman colonies at Scolacium and Tarentum. His novel policy of establishing colonies outside of Italy made him "apparently the first to realise that the amount of land in Italy was insufficient to provide for all inhabitants of the peninsula".

The legislative programme also included a law, the lex militaris, to provide soldiers' clothing from the public treasury and prohibit conscription of men below the age of seventeen. While the conscription age limit had already previously been law, "it is commonly said that Gracchus [included] this provision because [of] recent cases of persons below the minimum age being conscripted"; but this is rejected as implausible. The law more likely simply restated the conditions of military service.

This was followed by a law to establish farming tithes in Asia, "which in effect handed [the people of the province] over to the large corporations of tax farmers (i.e. Publicani)", to shore up support among the equestrians. A further bill to incorporate either 300 or 600 equestrians into the senate was probably ineffectual.

He also proposed a law, the lex Sempronia de provinciis consularibus, for the senate to assign consular provinces before elections to the consulship. He also made such senatorial assignments immune from tribunician veto; Ernst Badian notes "this law shows how far he was from being a 'democrat'". The purpose of the lex de provinciis consularibus was to prevent sitting consuls from using their positions in the electoral comitia to influence provincial assignments improperly. In general, his reforms were addressing major issues in administration. At the same time, he was a "proud aristocrat" and left the senate in charge of directing policy and its execution by magistrates, under more stringent checks by the people and anti-corruption laws. The ultimate result of his laws, however, was to set up the equestrian publicani as "a new exploiting class, not restrained by a tradition of service or accountability at law"; these consequences did not become clear for a generation. Further legislation included some laws establishing new customs duties.

At the elections of 123 BC, according to Plutarch, Gaius did not stand for election at all; rather, the tribes elected him spontaneously, with the election ratified by the presiding magistrate. Re-election might not have suited his plans – Gaius was needed in Africa to supervise construction of a colony at Carthage – but he was returned to the tribunate with friends: Marcus Fulvius Flaccus would be one of this tribunician colleagues and Gaius Fannius would be consul.

=== Second tribunate (122 BC) ===
Either after re-election to a second tribunate or during the second tribunate itself, he passed a law to transfer the jury pool in corruption courts (quaestio de repetundis) to the equestrians. This law, however, "merely reallocated influence from one section of the elite to another" and "did not 'democratise' [the repetundae court], merely hand[ing] control to non-senatorial members of the elite". This law also substantially changed Roman criminal procedure by allowing the allies to prosecute (both directly and through an intermediary) ex-magistrates for corruption.

The difficulty of finding enough land in Italy for resettlement – as taking land from the Italian allies was politically impossible as it would have "wrought serious damage to their interests" – led Gaius and his allies to pursue both Italian and foreign colonisation programmes. An ally of Gaius Gracchus, Gaius Rubrius, as part of the Gracchan programme, successfully carried a law to establish a colony at Carthage. One of the other tribunes in this year, Marcus Livius Drusus, countered Gaius and Rubrius' programme by proposing twelve colonies of three thousand needy families each, with allotments of land free from rent. Drusus' proposals passed also, but "came to nothing"; regardless, the passage led to establishment of a series of three-man boards to manage the various colonisation programmes. Supposedly, these proposals from Livius Drusus were brought at the prompting of the senate, which sought to find someone else to rival Gracchus' popularity.

Gaius also proposed, in probably two citizenship bills, giving citizenship to the Latins and Latin rights to Italian allies. Gaius' rationale may have been related to the land reform measures:

It may be that Gaius Gracchus, aware in hindsight of the problems which had arisen when the commission had wanted to take ager publicus away from the allies, tried to represent Tiberius' intentions as designed to benefit Italy in general, instead of the Roman citizens only.

The first bill, to give citizenship to the Latins, was vetoed by Drusus, and the second bill on Latin rights for the Italians may have also given them full citizenship rights; but, although Fannius was an ally of Gracchus, he opposed the second bill. Drusus countered Gaius' Italian citizenship bill with a much less extensive bill to exempt them from scourging, which passed. Fannius, for his part, was able to mobilise opposition to extending citizenship by convincing the people that extending citizenship would require them to share their privileges. A fragment of Fannius' speech survives:

I suppose you imagine that, if you give citizenship to the Latins, you will still have a place in the assembly in which you are standing, and will participate in the games and festivals. Don't you realise that they will swamp everything?

The issue persisted through the end of the year to the consular elections, when Fannius promulgated an edict expelling Italians from Rome, which was opposed by an edict of Gaius' which allegedly promised tribunician protection for any Italians who remained (but was, in the event unfulfilled).

He also proposed a bill to have the centuries (the Roman voting blocs) vote in a random order rather than in traditional order in which the richest centuries voted first. This would not have changed the overweighting of the rich in the Roman comitia, but would have ensured "the chances of those who drew their support from the poorer citizens would not be prejudiced". There is, however, no evidence that this bill passed.

During his second tribunate, he left the city – perhaps sanctioned by the senate – to supervise the foundation of the colony at Carthage, which supposedly was plagued with bad omens. The citizenship bills' failure, however, revealed his waning popularity, and he was defeated when he stood for re-election to a third consecutive tribunate.

== Outbreak of violence ==
In the new year, some of Gaius' and his allies' legislative programme came under attack. One of the tribunes for 121 BC, Minucius Rufus, wished to repeal the lex Rubria authorising the construction of the colony at Carthage. When an attendant jeered at Gracchus and his entourage during a sacrifice and was stabbed to death with styluses, the consul Lucius Opimius summoned a meeting of the senate, which Gracchus and his ally – Marcus Fulvius Flaccus – did not attend.

At the senate meeting, the senate moved the first "senatus consultum ultimum" and urged Opimius to defend the state by any means necessary. In response, Gracchus and Flaccus armed their followers and seized the temple of Diana on the Aventine Hill. Opimius called out the militia, along with some Cretan mercenary archers, and ordered the two to submit themselves to the judgement of the senate. After sending away a messenger seeking terms and rejecting Opimius' demand for their surrender, Opimius marched on the Aventine with his forces, offering bounties for Gracchus and Flaccus. Flaccus and his sons were killed, Gracchus was either killed or committed suicide after fleeing across the river Tiber.

== Aftermath ==
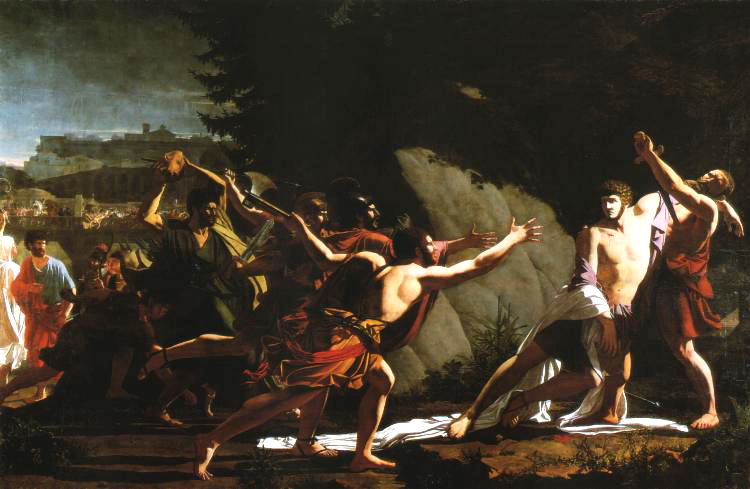
The Death of Gaius Gracchus, by François Topino-Lebrun, 1792.

In the aftermath of Gaius' death, a quaestio was established to try Gracchan supporters. Apparently, "many were executed after a brief investigation without the formalities of trial", with an extensive purge reportedly of thousands. Plutarch also reports that Gaius, Flaccus, and others' estates were confiscated, along with the dowry of his widow, Licinia; Plutarch, however, is likely wrong in this matter; it is more likely that only their houses were demolished, with their estates passing thence to their heirs.

Opimius was not entirely unreflective of his actions. Following the strife,

[Opimius] performed a ritual purification of the city (lustrum) that acknowledged the pollution caused by the shedding of blood inside the community’s sacred boundary. He then built an imposing new temple of the goddess Concord (Concordia) at the northwest end of the Forum adjacent to the senate house. The honoring of this deity clearly represented a pious hope for a return to a renewed sense of political harmony within the civic community... Care, thought, and expense were not spared in Opimius' efforts to bring acceptable closure to political strife and civil conflict.

Many in Rome, however, did not share his religious pretensions: according to Plutarch, one night an inscription was carved that read "A work of mad discord produces a temple of Concord." The events of this year also spilled into the next year. When Opimius gave up his consulship, he was prosecuted by Publius Decius Subulo – one of the plebeian tribunes for 120 BC – on charges of violating Gaius' lex Sempronia which prohibited the execution of Roman citizens without appeal to the people. Opimius, however, was able to successfully defend himself by pointing to the "senatus consultum ultimum" and claiming Gracchus' death was for the benefit of the republic. Opimius' successful defence legitimised the use of such senatorial decrees to suppress internal dissent. Andrew Lintott, in the Cambridge Ancient History, argues that such decrees had practical value due to the inability of the magistrates to suppress violent disorder in Rome without the use of force but also notes their nature as partial instruments to justify "the most brutal reprisals" on those who opposed the senate. The use of force itself, furthermore, set a precedent "suggest[ing] violence as the logical and more effective alternative to political engagement, negotiation, and compromise".

Gaius' legislation, however, mostly survived, revealing again that "it was no longer a specific issue that mattered so much as the urgent necessity to triumph over rivals". While the African colonies law was repealed, a new agrarian law continued distribution of territories around Carthage to the poor, and colonial schemes in Italy survived with minor changes. The matter of citizenship for the Italians, however, was not reintroduced for some thirty years. As a whole, "the aristocracy's reaction resembled that of a general dealing with a mutiny, who accedes to most of the demands but executes the ringleaders to preserve discipline". Overseas colonial projects also did not end: just a few years later, a bill was carried in defiance of the senate establishing a colony at Narbonne.

Only in 111 BC, some ten years later, was the Gracchan land commission disestablished by another lex agraria (sometimes called the lex Thoria but attribution is disputed), not because of plutocratic influence, but because the job of distributing public lands was complete. All public land distributed or otherwise confirmed under the Gracchan land reform laws was confirmed and fully privatised. By this point, practically the only remaining ager publicus was common pastureland or land under long-term leases, land which could not be distributed.

Gaius Gracchus' subsidised grain law also survived past this death. It was repealed only in the last decade of the century, by a Marcus Octavius who was tribune some time between 122 and 104, but was quickly revived by Lucius Appuleius Saturninus.

== Bibliography ==
=== Modern sources ===
- Badian, Ernst (1983). "The silence of Norbanus". American Journal of Philology. 104 (2): 156–171. doi:10.2307/294289. ISSN 0002-9475. JSTOR 294289.
- Badian, Ernst (2014). "Gracchus, Gaius (Gaius Sempronius Gracchus)". In Hornblower, Simon; Spawforth, Antony; Eidinow, Esther (eds.). The Oxford companion to classical civilization (2nd ed.). New York: Oxford University Press. ISBN 978-0-19-177848-3. OCLC 900444999.
- Beness, J Lea; Hillard, T W (2001). "The theatricality of the deaths of C Gracchus and friends" (PDF). Classical Quarterly. 51 (1): 135–140. doi:10.1093/cq/51.1.135. ISSN 1471-6844.
- Broughton, Thomas Robert Shannon (1951). Magistrates of the Roman republic. Vol. 1. American Philological Association.
- Broughton, Thomas Robert Shannon (1952). Magistrates of the Roman republic. Vol. 2. New York: American Philological Association.
- Broughton, Thomas Robert Shannon (1986). Magistrates of the Roman republic. Vol. 3. Atlanta, GA: Scholars Press.
- Brunt, P A (1988). The fall of the Roman republic and related essays. Clarendon. ISBN 0-19-814849-6. OCLC 799090262.
- Drogula, Fred K (2015). Commanders and command in the Roman republic and early empire. Chapel Hill: The University of North Carolina Press. ISBN 978-1-4696-2314-6. OCLC 905949529.
- Flower, Harriet I (2010). Roman republics. Princeton: Princeton University Press. ISBN 978-0-691-14043-8. OCLC 301798480.
- Golden, Gregory K (2013). Crisis management during the Roman republic: the role of political institutions in emergencies. Cambridge University Press. doi:10.1017/cbo9781139507462. ISBN 978-1-107-03285-9.
- Goldsworthy, Adrian (2016). In the name of Rome: the men who won the Roman empire. New Haven: Yale University Press. ISBN 978-0-300-22183-1. OCLC 936322646.
- Gwynn, David M (2012). The Roman republic: a very short introduction. Oxford University Press. ISBN 978-0-19-959511-2.
- Lintott, Andrew (1994). "Political history, 146–95 BC". In Crook, John; et al. (eds.). The last age of the Roman republic. Cambridge Ancient History. Vol. 9 (2nd ed.). Cambridge University Press. ISBN 0-521-85073-8. OCLC 121060.
- Mouritsen, Henrik (2017). Politics in the Roman republic. Cambridge University Press. ISBN 9781107031883.
- Rich, J W (1983). "The supposed Roman manpower shortage of the later second century BC". Historia: Zeitschrift für Alte Geschichte. 32 (3): 287–331. ISSN 0018-2311. JSTOR 4435854.
- Roselaar, Saskia T (2010). Public land in the Roman Republic: a social and economic history of ager publicus in Italy, 396-89 BC. Oxford: Oxford University Press. ISBN 978-0-19-957723-1. OCLC 520714519.
- Scullard, H H (2011) [1958]. From the Gracchi to Nero: a history of Rome from 133 BC to AD 68 (4th ed.). London: Routledge. ISBN 978-0-203-84478-6. OCLC 672031526.
- von Ungern-Sternberg, Jurgen (2014). "The crisis of the republic". In Flower, Harriet (ed.). The Cambridge companion to the Roman republic (2nd ed.). Cambridge University Press. ISBN 978-1-107-66942-0.

=== Ancient sources ===
- Cicero (1860) [55 BC]. De oratore. Translated by Watson, J S – via Attalus.org.
- Plutarch (1921) [2nd century AD]. "Life of Gaius Gracchus". Parallel Lives. Loeb Classical Library. Vol. 10. Translated by Perrin, Bernadotte. Harvard University Press – via LacusCurtius.
