= Publicia gens =

Ancient Roman family

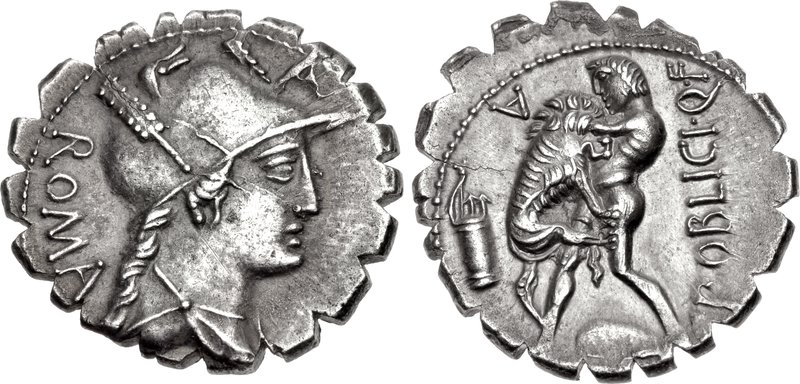
Denarius of Gaius Publicius, 80 BC. The obverse depicts a head of Roma, while on the reverse Hercules is strangling the Nemean lion, perhaps an allusion to the famous Temple of Hercules at Cora.

The gens Publicia (Pūblicia), occasionally found as Poblicia or Poplicia, was a plebeian family at ancient Rome. Members of this gens are first mentioned in history during the period following the First Punic War, and the only one to achieve the consulship was Marcus Publicius Malleolus in 232 BC.

== Origin ==
The nomen Publicius belongs to a class of gentilicia derived from words ending in -icus. The root, publicus, is a Latin adjective meaning "of the people". Although the Publicii are not mentioned at Rome prior to the third century BC, they claimed descent from a legendary figure from the time of the kings. Ancus Publicius of Cora was said to have been one of the generals of the Latin League, together with Spurius Vecilius of Lavinium, in a war against the Romans during the reign of Tullus Hostilius, the third King of Rome, who claimed dominion over the cities of Latium following the destruction of Alba Longa.

== Praenomina ==
Apart from Ancus, a name found only in antiquity, the praenomina associated with the Publicii appearing in history are Lucius, Gaius, Marcus, Quintus, and Gnaeus, all of which were among the most common names throughout Roman history.

== Branches and cognomina ==
There were two main branches, or stirpes, of the Publicii under the Republic, distinguished by the cognomina Malleolus and Bibulus. The surname Malleolus is a diminutive of malleus, a hammer, which was used as an emblem on coins of this family. The Publicii Malleoli flourished from the middle of the third century BC to the beginning of the first. Bibulus refers to a tippler, one known for drinking. Members of this family are mentioned in the time of the Second Punic War. Other surnames are found in imperial times. One family of the Publicii lived at Adria in Sabinum.

== Members ==
This list includes abbreviated praenomina. For an explanation of this practice, see filiation.

=== Early Publicii ===
- Ancus Publicius of Cora, one of the Latin generals in the war between Tullus Hostilius and the Latin League.

=== Publicii Malleoli ===
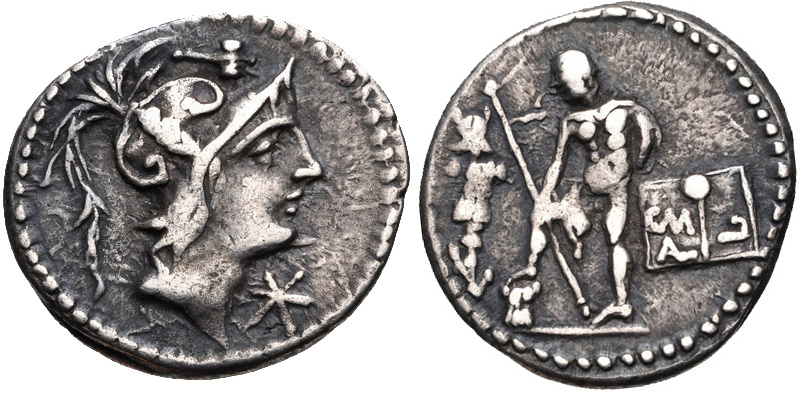
Denarius of Gaius Publicius Malleolus, late 90s BC. The obverse depicts a head of Mars and a hammer, alluding to the surname Malleolus. On the reverse is a naked warrior between a trophy and a ballot, with the inscription "C. Malleolus".

- Lucius Publicius, the grandfather of Lucius and Marcus, aediles in 241 BC.
- Lucius Publicius L. f., father of the aediles Lucius and Marcus.
- Lucius Publicius L. f. L. n. Malleolus, aedile with his brother, Marcus, in 241 BC. They used fines taken from those who had violated the agrarian laws to fund a number of public works, including the Clivus Publicius, a road leading up the Aventine Hill, and the temple of Flora. They also instituted the celebration of the Floralia.
- Marcus Publicius L. f. L. n. Malleolus, aedile with his brother, Lucius, in 241 BC, and consul in 232, when he was sent against the Sardinians.
- Gaius Publicius Gaius C. f. Malleolus, special moneyer for the foundation of Narbo Martius in 118 BC.
- Publicius Malleolus, became the first Roman to be convicted of matricide in 101 BC. He was sentenced to be sewn into a sack, and thrown into the sea.
- Gaius Publicius C. f. C. n. Malleolus, triumvir monetalis in the late 90s BC, and quaestor in 80 under Gnaeus Cornelius Dolabella, the proconsul of Cilicia. Having enriched himself at the expense of the natives, Malleolus died in office, and was succeeded by Verres. Cicero's assertion that Verres killed his predecessor in order to take his place is probably just a rhetorical flourish.

=== Publicii Bibuli ===
- Lucius Publicius Bibulus, a military tribune with the second legion in 216 BC, early in the Second Punic War.
- Gaius Publicius Bibulus, tribune of the plebs in 209 BC, an opponent of Marcus Claudius Marcellus, whom he unsuccessfully attempted to deprive of his imperium. He is probably the same Publicius who, as tribune of the plebs, passed the lex Publicia de cereis, relieving the poor of their ancient obligation to give wax candles to their patrons during the Saturnalia.

=== Others ===
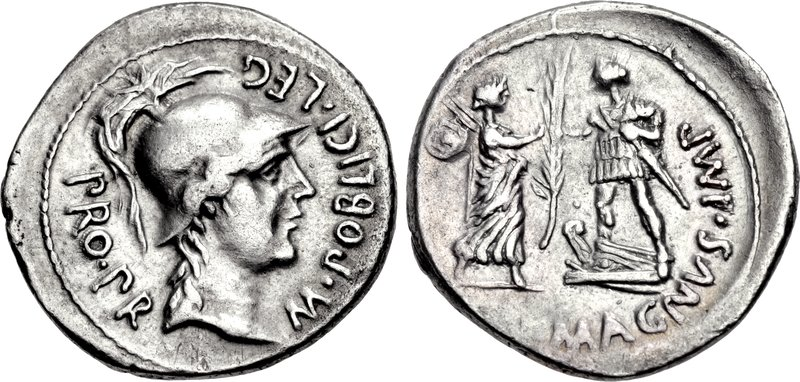
Denarius of Marcus Publicius, 46–45. The obverse depicts Roma, whilst the reverse shows Hispania bestowing the palm-branch of victory to a soldier on a ship, alluding to the arrival of the Pompeians in Spain after their defeat at Thapsus.

- Gaius Publicius, remarked that a certain Publius Mummius was "a man for all occasions," a figure of speech recorded by Cato the Elder, and subsequently mentioned by Cicero in his dialogue on oratory. Glandorp suggests that he might the same person as Gaius Publicius Bibulus, tribune of the plebs in 209 BC.
- Lucius Publicius, a slave merchant, and a friend of Sextus Naevius, whom Cicero mentions in 81 BC.
- Marcus Publicius M. f. Scaeva, a senator in 73 BC.
- Publicius, a seer mentioned by Cicero.
- Publicius, an eques who gained notoriety for ambitus, or electoral bribery, about 70 BC.
- Publicia, became Flaminica Martialis in 69 BC, as her husband, Lucius Cornelius Lentulus Niger, was inaugurated as Flamen Martialis.
- Quintus Publicius Q. f., praetor circa 67 BC, presided over the trial of Decimus Matrinius, whom Cicero defended.
- Gaius Publicius Q. f., triumvir monetalis in 80 BC, probably the brother of Quintus Publicius, the praetor.
- Quintus Publicius Q. f. Q. n., a senator buried at Verona, had been legatus pro praetore in an uncertain province.
- Publicius Gellius, a jurist, who had been one of the pupils of Servius Sulpicius Rufus. He might perhaps be the same person as Quintus Publicius, the praetor.
- Publicius, a member of the conspiracy of Catiline.
- Marcus Publicius, a legatus pro praetore serving under the younger Pompeius in Spain from 46 to 45 BC, minted coins prior to the Battle of Munda.
- Gnaeus Publicius Menander, a freedman, whom Cicero mentions in his oration, Pro Balbo.
- Gnaeus Publicius Regulus, one of the duumviri quinquennales at Corinth in from AD 50 to 51. He issued a series of bronze coins during his magistracy.
- Publicius Certus, denounced Helvidius Priscus for disloyalty during the reign of Domitian, resulting in Helvidius' death. He was made praefectus aerarii, and promised the consulship, but was accused by Pliny the Younger following the death of Domitian, and was deprived of his position, dying shortly thereafter.
- Lucius Publicius Celsus, consul in AD 113, and subsequently put to death by Hadrian, is apparently a mistake for Lucius Publilius Celsus.

== See also ==
- List of Roman gentes

== Bibliography ==
- Marcus Tullius Cicero, De Divinatione, De Oratore, In Catilinam, Pro Balbo, Pro Cluentio, Pro Quinctio, Rhetorica ad Herennium (attributed).
- Marcus Terentius Varro, De Lingua Latina (On the Latin Language).
- Dionysius of Halicarnassus, Romaike Archaiologia.
- Titus Livius (Livy), History of Rome.
- Publius Ovidius Naso (Ovid), Fasti.
- Marcus Velleius Paterculus, Compendium of Roman History.
- Pseudo-Asconius, Commentarius in Oratorio Ciceronis in Verrem (Commentary on Cicero's In Verrem), ed. Orelli.
- Gaius Plinius Caecilius Secundus (Pliny the Younger), Epistulae (Letters).
- Publius Cornelius Tacitus, Annales.
- Lucius Cassius Dio Cocceianus (Cassius Dio), Roman History.
- Festus, Breviarum Rerum Gestarum Populi Romani (Summary of the History of the Roman People).
- Aelius Lampridius, Aelius Spartianus, Flavius Vopiscus, Julius Capitolinus, Trebellius Pollio, and Vulcatius Gallicanus, Historia Augusta (Augustan History).
- Paulus Orosius, Historiarum Adversum Paganos (History Against the Pagans).
- Ambrosius Theodosius Macrobius, Saturnalia.
- Digesta, or Pandectae (The Digest).
- Joannes Zonaras, Epitome Historiarum (Epitome of History).
- Johann Glandorp, Onomasticon Historiae Romanae, André Wechel son Fils, Frankfurt (1589).
- Dictionary of Greek and Roman Biography and Mythology, William Smith, ed., Little, Brown and Company, Boston (1849).
- Wilhelm Dittenberger, Sylloge Inscriptionum Graecarum (Collection of Greek Inscriptions, abbreviated SIG), Leipzig (1883).
- George Davis Chase, "The Origin of Roman Praenomina", in Harvard Studies in Classical Philology, vol. VIII (1897).
- Luigi Sorricchio, Hatria = Atri, Tipografia Del Senato, Rome (1911).
- Harold Mattingly, "Some Historical Coins of the Late Republic", in The Journal of Roman Studies, vol. 12 (1922), pp. 230–239.
- T. Robert S. Broughton, The Magistrates of the Roman Republic, American Philological Association (1952).
- T. P. Wiseman, "Two More Senators", in Classical Quarterly, vol. 15, No. 1 (May, 1965), pp. 158–160.
- Michael Crawford, Roman Republican Coinage, Cambridge University Press (1974, 2001).
- Michel Amandry, Le monnayage des duovirs corinthiens, Paris (1988).
- John C. Traupman, The New College Latin & English Dictionary, Bantam Books, New York (1995).
