= Ancient Mediterranean piracy =

Piracy in the ancient Mediterranean

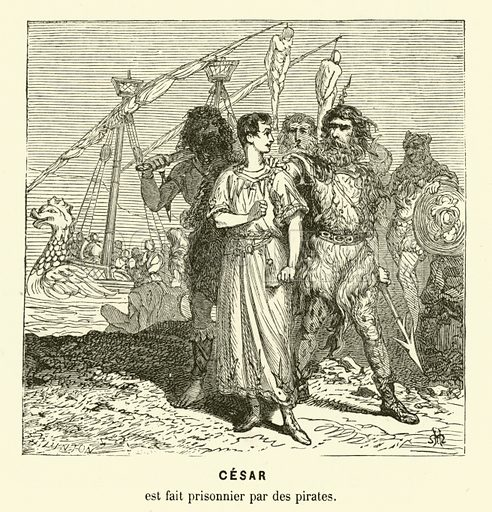
Julius Caesar taken captive by Cilician pirates (Henri De Montaut, 1865)

Piracy in the ancient Mediterranean dates back at least as far as the Bronze Age. The roots of the word "piracy" come from the ancient Greek πειράομαι, or peiráomai, meaning "attempt" (i.e., of something illegal for personal gain). This morphed into πειρατής, or peiratēs, meaning "brigand," and from that to the Latin pirata, where the modern English word pirate originated. According to the classical historian Janice Gabbert, "The eastern Mediterranean has been plagued by piracy since the first dawn of history." The Bronze Age marked the earliest documented wave of piracy, as it is difficult to differentiate piracy from trade during earlier periods.

== Origins ==
A number of geographic and economic characteristics of the classical world produced an environment that encouraged piracy. According to classicist Henry Arderne Ormerod, "[t]he coasts of the Mediterranean are particularly favorable to the development of piracy." The barren, rocky shoreline was not suitable for large-scale agriculture and could not support a large population. Therefore, most villages were small and of little means. The primary method of support came from fishing; most men had boats, seafaring skills, and navigational knowledge. When fishing could not reliably sustain them, many people turned to highway robbery and raids of nearby territories to support themselves. However, land trade routes were few and far between, given mountainous obstacles and few rivers; trade and travel therefore was carried out primarily by sea.

In the early days of maritime navigation, most trade vessels traveled along the coasts. According to geographer Ellen Churchill Semple, "traffic was restricted to fixed lanes in a way impossible on the open ocean." The naukleroi, or ship-owning merchantmen, moved slowly along established trade routes, weighed down by heavy cargo. Fishermen would encounter treasure-laden trade ships passing the shores day after day and, if possessed of the motivation and means, the more economically desperate among them would take on the risks of banditry for a chance at treasure. Semple wrote that "[t]he pirate was the robber of the sea highways: and the highways of the Mediterranean were well-defined and well-traveled."

== Early development ==
The rocky coast that had been unsuitable for agriculture was well suited to piracy, outfitted with hidden inlets that allowed quick access points to trade routes. According to writer Cindy Vallar, "pirate enclaves grew up along rocky shores that provided shelter and kept them hidden from view until it was too late for their victims to escape."

Because of early maritime raiders' roots in land raiding, they were known to attack ships and coastal towns and to venture further inland. This caused even the earliest large cities to relocate from 2 to 10 miles away from the shore. Pirates tended not to go farther inland due to difficulties escaping. This relocation gave safety to major cities such as Athens, Tiryns, Mycenae and others. It protected them from the sea's dangers, although it also cut them off from its benefits. The sea was still the primary area of major commerce. This caused twin cities to be built, one inland city paired with a coastal port, such as Rome and Ostia, Athens and Piraeus, and so on. To protect their connection they built "'long walls' ... that enclosed [their] thoroughfare." Ormerod wrote that if it is "[understood] that piracy was, for centuries, a normal feature of Mediterranean life, it [would] be realized how great [its] influence [has been] ... on the life of the ancient world."

Despite these efforts, they could not completely remove contact between the pirates and the ports. Since they could not effectively disrupt the piracy, it further grew. Men often joined the pirate ships that attacked their own towns. Even the sailors on merchant ships attacked by pirates turned to piracy when they were out of work. Piracy offered a lucrative career, a chance for those who were interested to try to change their lives and better their livelihood a hundredfold in a short time. For example, the area around Crete, with its slave markets, was known as "the Golden Sea" because of the profitability of the slave trade.

Crete was also notable for its pirates. If a city had a successful slave market it was most likely a pirate port. Notorious pirate havens like Cilicia and Delos had thriving slave markets. According to the ancient geographer Strabo, as many as ten thousand slaves were sold in Delos in one day. Being kidnapped by pirates and sold into slavery was so common that it was a theme of ancient Greek dramatists.

== Egypt and piracy ==
Histories of the early Mediterranean include many references to piracy and measures taken to deal with it. Egypt is the primary source for many of these early accounts, both because of its greater level of documentation in comparison with the less developed states of the Greek Dark Ages and because much of its documentation was carved into stone or preserved in the dry sand.

The Amarna letters, a series of 362 clay correspondence tablets from the king of Babylon to Pharaoh Amenhotep III or his son Akhenaten written around 1350 BCE, tell of sea raiders beginning not just to plunder ships but also to capture Babylonian towns. The correspondence reveals how such piracy could affect both commerce and diplomatic relations between kingdoms. The tablets mention two groups of pirates, the Lukka (modern Turkey) and the Sherden, raising both security concerns and economic disruption. Correspondence between the Egyptian pharaoh and the king of Alashiya emphasizes the threat posed by the Lukka, with Akhenaten accusing the Alashiyan king of aiding the pirates. The king denied this, claiming that his own cities had been raided and that he had introduced countermeasures to combat piracy.

Nearly a century later, the Sherden remained a threat, with Ramses II recording on the Tanis Stele, "the unruly Sherden whom no one had ever known how to combat, they came boldly sailing in their warships from the midst of the sea, none being able to withstand them."

The diverse group known collectively as the "Sea Peoples", a term used by Ramses III on his mortuary temple at Medinet Habu as well as on numerous obelisks and stelae, may have also been pirates. Ramses III recorded accounts of attacks by named enemies of the Peleset (Philistines), and even the Hittites, but several of the enemies he is shown to be subjugating are only given the uncertain epithet "of the sea". Ramses III describes how he defeated them by drawing them inland, "like the sand on the shore." Possible members of the "Sea Peoples" include the Tjeker people of Crete, who left to settle Anatolia, the seat of the Hittite Empire, which is known to have clashed with the Egyptians.

This negative view of the Sea Peoples in Pharaonic texts follows the general pattern of Egyptian discussion of outsiders; they are viewed derogatorily until they become useful. There is evidence that as the power of Greece and Persia grew, it became more acceptable for Egyptian rulers to hire pirates for their own ends, and by the early Hellenistic period they were so widely employed as extra-legal forces that "there seemed to be no real distinction made between a pirate and a mercenary." Despite the closeness between these two professions, they were not synonymous with "criminal." The original Greek word for pirate was not incorporated into the language until 140 BCE. More often than not, 'pirate' simply implied 'other an outsider', but not necessarily a lawbreaker.

== Piracy in Greece ==
The rulers of Minoan Crete were the first to raise a navy specifically for the purpose of battling piracy. Greek sources describe this navy as the product of the legendary king Minos, and suggest "it is likely he cleared the sea of piracy as far as he was able, to improve his revenues." According to myth, he curbed piracy in his area until his fleet was destroyed by a tsunami around 1400 BCE, and piratical activities resumed.

Many texts from Bronze Age and archaic Greece condone piracy as a viable profession. In ancient Greece, "piracy seems to have been widespread and widely regarded as an entirely honourable way of making a living." Numerous references are made to its normal occurrence in Homer's Iliad and Odyssey, thought to have been written from oral tradition sometime in the 7th or 6th century BCE—for example:

We boldly landed on the hostile place,
And sacked the city,
And destroyed the race,
Their wives made captive,
Their possessions shared,
And every soldier found a like reward.

— Odysseus, in The Odyssey, by Homer

Over a century later, the Greek historian Thucydides (ca. 460–395 BCE) wrote that Greeks found a livelihood in piracy:

For in early times the Hellenes and the barbarians of the coast and islands, as communication by sea became more common, were tempted to turn pirate… indeed, this came to be the main source of their livelihood, no disgrace being yet attached to such an achievement, but even some glory.

In Classical Greece, piracy was looked upon as a "disgrace" partly because it came with the threat of ransom and enslavement for citizens as they traveled; the threat of slavery on land was seen as an inevitable law. At the height of Athens's power though, there are few epigraphic reports of piracy. Thucydides does not mention the threat as a particular motive for the cultivation of the Athenian Empire's fleet, so it is likely that the relative safety of the Classical seas in comparison to Hellenistic times was a side effect of, rather than a motivation for, the development of the Delian League.

== Piracy in the Hellenistic period ==
Reports of piracy did not resurge in the Mediterranean until after Alexander the Great's death in 323 BCE; he set a precedent for an intentional effort to curb piracy during his conquests around the Mediterranean. In his De Civitate Dei, St. Augustine recounted an exchange between Alexander and a captured pirate:

For when that king had asked the man what he meant by keeping hostile possession of the sea, he answered with bold pride, "What do thou meanest by seizing the whole earth? Because I do it with a petty ship, I am called a robber, whilst thou who dost it with a great fleet art styled emperor."

After Alexander's death and during the subsequent wars among his successors, both independent crews of brigands and state hired mercenaries were sources of piracy. Demetrius I of Macedon in particular used naval mercenaries to his advantage, and these mercenaries included crews who would otherwise have been engaged in piracy. According to Diodorus Siculus book 20, the pirates of Demetrius used "deckless" ships, likely for increased speed.

The famous wreck of the Kyrenia ship dates from around this period in the 4th century BCE, and was found with spear shafts embedded in its hull and a lead "curse tablet", which the excavators suggest was put there by a pirate as the ship sank, to avoid retribution for the crime.

By the time Rhodes had become the dominant naval power of the Aegean, part of the function of the League of the Islanders (which was founded by Antigonus I Monophthalmus to be an allied force in the Wars of the Diadochi) was to deflect pirates from its member states. Rhodes was the central trading area of the Mediterranean at this time, with five harbors that could be accessed from all wind directions, at a fairly even distance from most major Hellenistic powers, and it was imperative for their economy that the waters around them be seen by traders as safe from pirates.

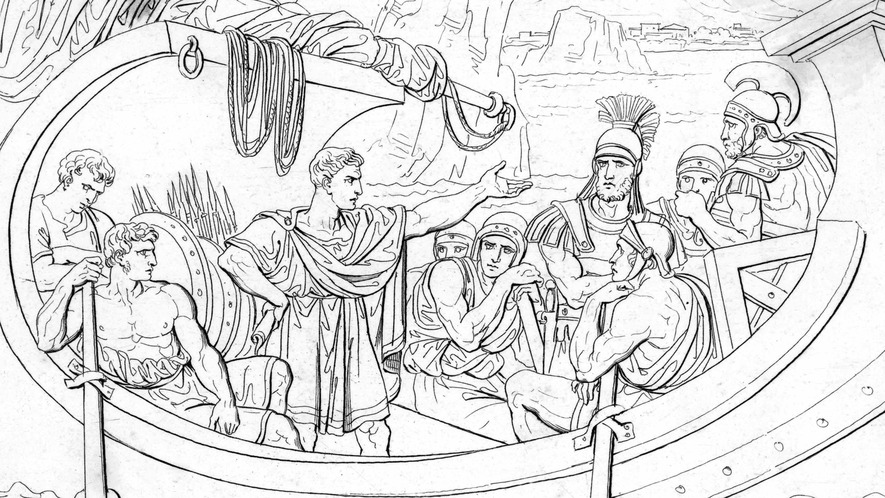
Caesar harangues his pirate captors (Bettmann, 1820)

In 167 BCE Rome forcibly made Delos a "duty free" port to undercut the power and wealth of Rhodes, and Rhodesian harbor-tax income dropped from 1 million drachmas to 150,000 drachmas in a year. Without its policing influence, piracy grew rampant even in the eastern Mediterranean.

Defense from pirates is frequently given as one of the reasons for cities to set up honorific decrees for individuals, as with the c. 166 BCE decree from Imbros: "Lysanias is benevolent towards the people […] he stood firm and brought news of the descent of pirates."

Piracy was particularly endemic in certain areas, notably Cilicia and Illyria. There is evidence that "the coastal Illyrian tribes had created their own type of vessel, the lembus, in which to carry out their depredations." It was a small, fast ship built to serve the purpose of quickly emerging from or retreating to hidden inlets to attack heavier vessels.

Illyrian piracy could be more correctly termed privateering, as it was endorsed by the state. In Polybius’ Histories, which covers the period of 220–146 BCE. His description of Teuta, queen of the Illyrians states, reads: "Her first measure was to grant letters of marque to privateers, authorising them to plunder all whom they fell in with."

Rome's attention was on land-based conquests, and they did not initially seek to become the naval police that Rhodes (and previously Athens) had been for the Greek islands. However, when Illyrian forces attacked a convoy of ships with grain intended for the military, the Roman Senate decided to send two envoys to Queen Teuta, who promptly had one killed. Outraged, "Consul Gnaeus Fulvius sailed for Illyria with two hundred ships, while Consul Aulus Postumius and 20,000 soldiers marched overland." By 228 BCE, Teuta had surrendered, and the Romans had decimated the forces of one of the most notorious pirate havens in the Mediterranean.

== See also ==
- Jewish pirates
- Thalassocracy
- Lex Gabinia de piratis persequendis

== Sources ==
- Ormerod, Henry A. (1974) Piracy in the Ancient World: An Essay in Mediterranean History. Liverpool University Press. ISBN 0-853-23044-7
- Waterfield, Robin (2011). Dividing the Spoils: The War for Alexander the Great's Empire (Ancient Warfare and Civilization). Oxford University Press. ISBN 978-0-1953-9523-5.
