= Marcus Junius Pera =

Dictator of the Roman Republic
- In office: 216 BC
- Magister equitum: Tiberius Sempronius Gracchus

Censor of the Roman Republic
- In office: 225 BC
- Colleague: Gaius Claudius Centho

Consul of the Roman Republic
- In office: 230 BC
- Colleague: Marcus Aemilius Barbula

Marcus Junius Pera (fl. 230 – 216 BC) was a Roman politician before and during the Second Punic War.

== Career ==
Pera served as one of the consuls for the year 230 BC; during his consulship, he – along with his colleague Marcus Aemilius Barbula – campaigned against local tribes in Liguria.

He also was elected censor for 225 BC with Gaius Claudius Centho as his colleague. They conducted a census of the Roman population: Livy reports the number of citizens as 270,213.

== Dictatorship ==
During Hannibal's invasion of Italy during the Second Punic War, the Carthaginian general all but wiped out an 85,000-strong Roman army at the Battle of Cannae in 216 BC. In doing so, one consul, Lucius Aemilius Paullus, was killed. The other consul, Gaius Terentius Varro, escaped to Venusia and collected his shattered army to Canusium.

After news of the disaster, Pera was appointed as dictator with Tiberius Sempronius Gracchus as his magister equitum. He immediately instituted a levy to replace the men killed at Cannae. A levy was ordered, conscripting underage boys to fill up four legions and even buying and arming 8,000 slave volunteers with public funds. By doing so, he had created a citizen army of four legions, reinforced by the slave-force and contributions from remaining allies. He also cancelled the debts of all men who enlisted in the armies or had been convicted of a capital offence.

He fought no pitched battle against Hannibal during his time in command; he relieved Casilinum and left his magister equitum there while he returned to Rome to repeat the auspices. Zonaras reports Pera as being wrong-footed by Hannibal as he was shadowing his camp. After ordering his men to copy the schedules of the Carthaginians – and thus not be taken by surprise – Pera was attacked by a detachment of Hannibal's army. When his troops had repulsed the offensive and retired, assuming the Carthaginians would now rest, he was surprised by a second attack from the bulk of the Carthaginian force that Hannibal had kept in reserve.

His dictatorship is also notable for the concurrent appointment of Marcus Fabius Buteo. It marked the only occasion in Roman history where two dictators were in office at the same time. With Pera away on campaign, Buteo was selected to appoint new men to the Roman Senate after its ranks had been diminished greatly at Cannae. According to Livy, Buteo was uncomfortable with the unprecedented dual-dictatorship and resigned promptly on completing his task.

== See also ==
- Junia (gens)

Preceded by Marcus Pomponius Matho and Gaius Papirius Maso	Consul of the Roman Republic with Marcus Aemilius Barbula; 230 BC	Succeeded by Lucius Postumius Albinus and Gnaeus Fulvius Centumalus
