= Marcus Aemilius Barbula =

3rd-century BC Roman consul

Marcus Aemilius Barbula L. F. Q. N. (son of Lucius, grandson of Quintus; see filiation) was a Roman politician from the gens Aemilia who lived in the 3rd century BCE.

He was a consul in 230 BCE, alongside Marcus Junius Pera, succeeding Marcus Pomponius Matho and Gaius Papirius Maso and preceding Lucius Postumius Albinus and Gnaeus Fulvius Centumalus.

He was son of Lucius Aemilius Barbula and grandson of Quintus Aemilius Barbula, also consuls, and the third and last of the lineage in this charge.

In conjunction with his consular colleague, he campaigned against the local tribes in Liguria.

== See also ==
- Aemilia (gens)

Preceded by Marcus Pomponius Matho and Gaius Papirius Maso	Consul of the Roman Republic with Marcus Junius Pera; 230 BCE	Succeeded by Lucius Postumius Albinus and Gnaeus Fulvius Centumalus
