= Carvilia gens =

Plebeian family at ancient Rome

The gens Carvilia was a plebeian family at ancient Rome, which first distinguished itself during the Samnite Wars. The first member of this gens to achieve the consulship was Spurius Carvilius Maximus, in 293 BC.

== Origin ==
The Carvilii were a modest family of equestrian rank, which rose to prominence due to the military exploits of Spurius Carvilius Maximus. The nomen Carvilius belongs to a large class of gentilicia ending in -ilus or -illus, typically derived from diminutive surnames originally ending in -ulus. The root of the name is uncertain; perhaps related to the surname Carbo, a coal, or coal-black.

== Praenomina ==
The only praenomina used by the Carvilii were Spurius, Gaius, and Lucius.

== Branches and cognomina ==
The Carvilii of the Republic were not divided into separate families, and the only cognomen that was handed down among them was Maximus, "very great" or "greatest", which was probably applied first to Spurius Carvilius, the consul of 293 and 272 BC, in recognition of his military victories and splendid character. Two of this family bore the additional surname Ruga, a furrow or wrinkle.

== Members ==
This list includes abbreviated praenomina. For an explanation of this practice, see filiation.

- Spurius Carvilius, quaestor in 391 BC, accused Marcus Furius Camillus of appropriating a bronze door from the spoils of Veii. Camillus was prosecuted by Lucius Apuleius, a tribune of the plebs, and sent into exile.
- Gaius Carvilius, the grandfather of Spurius Carvilius Maximus, the consul of 293 and 272 BC.
- Gaius Carvilius C. f., the father of Spurius Carvilius Maximus.
- Spurius Carvilius C. f. C. n. Maximus, consul in 293 BC, he defeated the Samnites and Faliscans, taking several towns and receiving a magnificent triumph. He was probably censor about 289. Consul for the second time in 272, he and his colleague triumphed over the Samnites, Lucanians, Bruttians, and Tarentines.
- Spurius Carvilius S. f. C. n. Maximus Ruga, consul in 234 BC, he fought against the Corsicans, and then the Sardinians, for which he received a triumph. He was consul for the second time in 228, with Quintus Fabius Maximus Verrucosus as his colleague. After the Battle of Cannae, he proposed filling the ranks of the senate with the leading men of Rome's Latin allies, but his advice was soundly rejected. He gained a certain notoriety for divorcing his wife, on grounds of barrenness.
- Spurius Carvilius Ruga, a freedman and schoolteacher at Rome circa 230 BC, credited with developing the letter G.
- Spurius Carvilius, tribune of the plebs in 212 BC, together with his colleague, Lucius Carvilius, indicted Marcus Postumius Pyrgensis for defrauding the Roman state. Pyrgensis, a publican, had deliberately sunk old ships with worthless cargo, in order to claim substantial losses and enriching himself.
- Lucius Carvilius, tribune of the plebs in 212 BC, joined his colleague Spurius Carvilius in indicting Marcus Postumius Pyrgensis.
- Spurius Carvilius, legate of the propraetor Gnaeus Sicinius in 171 BC, was appointed by the senate to watch the ambassadors of Perseus, and ensure that they departed Italy.
- Gaius Carvilius, a native of Spoletium, negotiated the surrender of the Roman garrison at Uscana to Perseus in 169 BC.
- Spurius Carvilius L. f., member of the Roman senate in 129 BC.

== See also ==
- List of Roman gentes

== Bibliography ==
- Marcus Tullius Cicero, Cato Maior de Senectute.
- Dionysius of Halicarnassus, Romaike Archaiologia (Roman Antiquities).
- Titus Livius (Livy), History of Rome.
- Marcus Velleius Paterculus, Compendium of Roman History.
- Valerius Maximus, Factorum ac Dictorum Memorabilium (Memorable Facts and Sayings).
- Gaius Plinius Secundus (Pliny the Elder), Historia Naturalis (Natural History).
- Aulus Gellius, Noctes Atticae (Attic Nights).
- Joannes Zonaras, Epitome Historiarum (Epitome of History).
- Barthold Georg Niebuhr, The History of Rome, Julius Charles Hare and Connop Thirlwall, trans., John Smith, Cambridge (1828).
- Dictionary of Greek and Roman Biography and Mythology, William Smith, ed., Little, Brown and Company, Boston (1849).
- René Cagnat et alii, L'Année épigraphique (The Year in Epigraphy, abbreviated AE), Presses Universitaires de France (1888–present).
- George Davis Chase, "The Origin of Roman Praenomina", in Harvard Studies in Classical Philology, vol. VIII, pp. 103–184 (1897).
- T. Robert S. Broughton, The Magistrates of the Roman Republic, American Philological Association (1952–1986).
- Robert K. Sherk, "The Text of the Senatus Consultum De Agro Pergameno", in Greek, Roman, and Byzantine Studies, vol. 7, pp. 361–369 (1966).
- John C. Traupman, The New College Latin & English Dictionary, Bantam Books, New York (1995).
