= Marcus Aemilius Lepidus (consul 232 BC) =

3rd-century BC Roman consul

Marcus Aemilius Lepidus (died 216 BC) was the Roman consul for 232 BC, and according to Livy served again as suffect consul, possibly in 221.

He also served at one time as augur.

According to Livy, in 218 BC, at the onset of the Second Punic War, he was in Sicily serving as propraetor.

Lepidus died in 216 BC.

It was in Lepidus' honor that the first gladiatorial games (munera) were held, on the occasion of his death. He had three sons: Lucius, Quintus, and Marcus. The latter was most likely the Marcus Aemilius Lepidus, who was a Roman consul and Pontifex Maximus in the early 2nd century BC.

== Notes ==
Political offices
Preceded by Quintus Fabius Maximus Verrucosus; Manius Pomponius Matho	Roman consul 232 BC; With: Marcus Publicius Malleolus	Succeeded by Marcus Pomponius Matho; Caius Papirius Maso
