= Onomasticon =

Onomasticon may refer to:

- Onomasticon (Eusebius)
- Onomasticon of Amenope
- Onomasticon of Joan Coromines
- Onomasticon of Julius Pollux
- Onomasticon of Johann Glandorp
- Onomasticon Anglo-Saxonicum (1897), or Searle's Onomasticon, by William George Searle
