= Battle of Silva Litana =

Battle of the Second Punic War

- Part of the Second Punic War
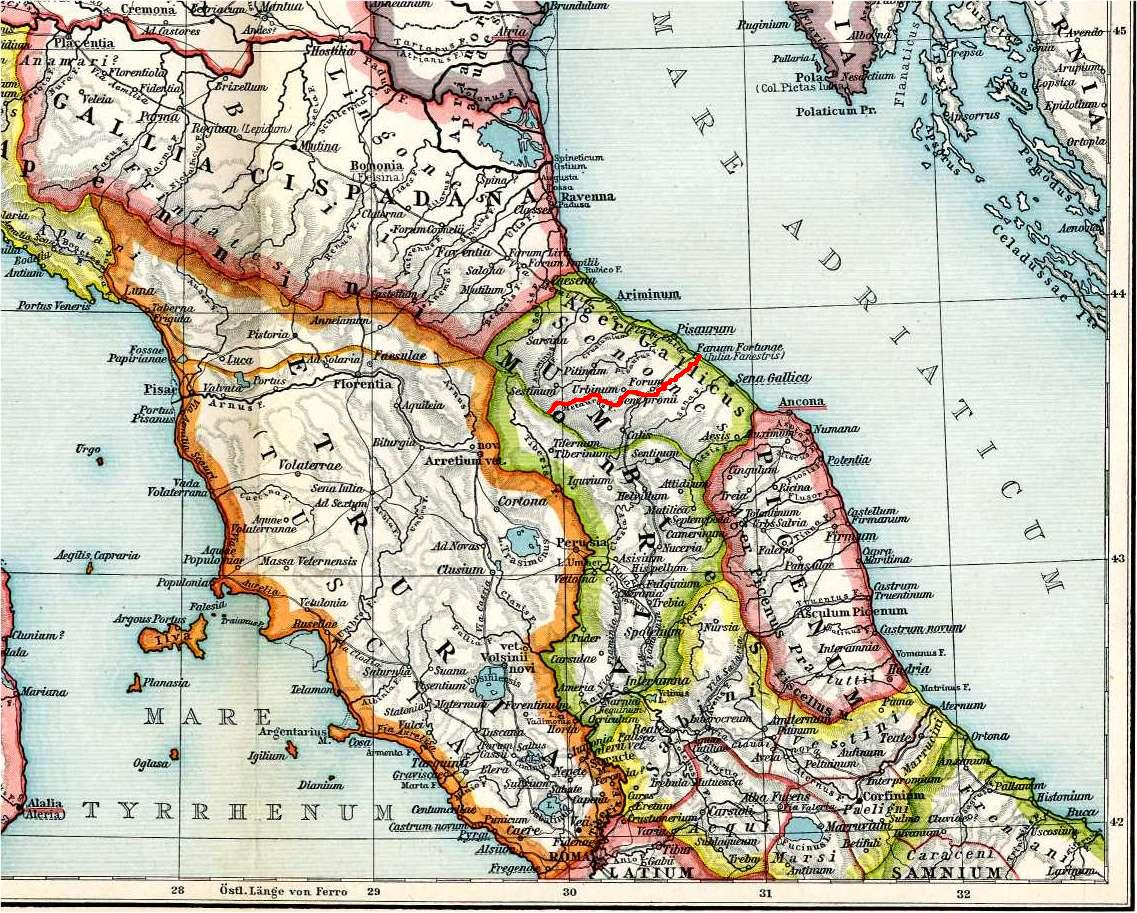
- Battle of Silva Litana
Date	216 BC
Location	Forest of Litana, 75 miles northwest of Ariminum 44.4091667°N 11.0916667°E
Result	Boii victory

Belligerents
Boii	Rome

Commanders and leaders
Unknown	Lucius Postumius Albinus †

Strength
Unknown	25,000

Casualties and losses
Unknown	24,990 killed

The Battle of Silva Litana was an ambush that took place in a forest 75 miles northwest of the Roman city of Ariminum during the Second Punic War in 216 BC. The Gallic Boii surprised and destroyed a Roman army under the consul-elect Lucius Postumius Albinus. Of 25,000 Romans, only 13 survived, with a few being taken prisoner by the Gauls. The corpse of Postumius was decapitated and his skull was made into a gilded ceremonial cup by the Boii. News of this military disaster probably reached Rome after the defeat at Cannae in the fall of 216 BC or the spring election of consuls for 215 BC, triggering a renewed panic. The Romans were compelled to postpone military operations against the Gauls until the conclusion of the Second Punic War, sending only two legions to guard against additional Gallic attacks. However, the Boii and Insubres did not attempt to exploit their victory. Cisalpine Gaul remained in relative peace until 207 BC, when Hasdrubal Barca arrived there with his army from Spain.

== Background ==
The peoples of Cisalpine Gaul, 391–192 BC

Several Gallic tribes, including the Senones, the Boii and the Insubres, had settled in the Po Valley after driving out the Etruscans and Umbrians by 390 BC. Hostilities between Rome and the Gauls started when the Romans tried to aid the Etruscan city of Clusium against the warlike Senones, who were led by Brennus. The Senones defeated the Romans at the Battle of Allia between 390–387 BC and partially sacked the city of Rome, before they were either driven out or bought off by the Romans. Rome was rebuilt with new stone defensive walls, and although the Gauls launched raids into Latium in 361, 358, 350 and 349 BC, the Romans lost no territory, however, Romans lived in fear of Gallic invasions for several generations until the final pacification of Gauls during the last century of the Roman Republic.

=== Romans defeat the Senones ===
In 295 BC the Romans won the Battle of Sentinum against the Etruscans and their Gallic allies, gaining the upper hand over the Gauls; a victory of the Senones over a Roman army at Arretium in 284 BC failed to alter the new balance of power. Roman victory at Lake Vadimo in 283 BC, against an army made up of Senones, Boii and Etruscans, led to the destruction of the Senones as an independent power with their subsequent expulsion from their lands, which were reorganized by the Romans as the Ager Gallicus, centered upon the Latin Rights colony of Sena Gallica. Romans and Gauls lived in peace for the next 47 years until hostilities broke out with the Boii, who had settled around the Etruscan city of Felsina.

== Roman consolidation in Cisalpine Gaul ==
After defeating a rebellion of the Picentes in 269 BC, the Romans had further consolidated their hold south of Ager Gallicus, planting new colonies at Ariminum and Firmum. The Boii and the Insubres may have clashed with the Romans between 238–236 BC, and they again became hostile after 232 BC when Gaius Flaminius (consul 223 BC) passed the Lex Flaminia de Agro Gallico et Piceno viritim dividundo. This legislation caused a further influx of Roman settlers in Ager Gallicus and Ager Picenus and led the Boii and Insubres to fear Roman incursion on their existing lands.

=== Defeat of the Boii and Insubres ===
With the help of the Gaesatae, mercenaries from Transalpine Gaul, the Boii and the Insubres defeated a Roman army in the Battle of Faesulae in 225 BC. Nonetheless, the Boii resistance collapsed in the following year; already under attack by Gallic tribes allied to Rome, namely the Veneti and the Cenomani, they were subjugated by the Romans following their defeat at the Battle of Telamon. Having lost battles at Acerrae and Clastidium, the Insubres surrendered after their capital Mediolanum fell to the Romans in 222 BC. Both the Boii and the Insubres were forced to become Roman allies. The Romans in 218 BC planted Latin rights colonies at Cremona and Placentia and fortified Mutina to keep watch over the Gauls, which again stirred up resentment among the Boii and Insubres.

== Second Punic War ==
Hannibal Barca had planned to invade Italy overland from Spain, since Roman naval dominance of the Mediterranean Sea made a sea-borne invasion impossible. (Note: Carthage had no bases on the sea coast between the Balearic Islands and Italy, which were dominated by Roman ally Massalia and her colonies, Rome controlled Sardinia, Corsica and Sicily, and thus effectively controlled the coast between Spain and Italy, so a sea voyage would have been more dangerous than a land one. In 218 BC, Rome had mobilized 220 Quinqueremes, while Carthage only had 32 quinqueremes manned in Spain and another 55 in Carthage. The largest fleet Carthage would launch during the war would have 130 quinqueremes, in 212 BC.) The Romans expected Carthage to remain on the defensive, and Hannibal hoped that the invasion would catch them off guard and forestall the expected Roman invasions of Spain and Africa.

The Boii and Insubres had agreed to meet Hannibal with provisions and reinforcements upon his arrival in Italy, when the Carthaginian army would be at its most vulnerable due to exhaustion and expected losses during the Alpine crossing. After the war broke out in the spring of 218 BC, the Boii and Insubres, resenting Roman occupation of Gallic lands and perhaps incited by agents of Hannibal, attacked the Roman colonies of Placentia and Cremona, afterwards besieging Mutina where the colonists had fled. This revolt, which probably occurred in April or May, would ultimately force Rome and Hannibal to change their respective war strategies.

=== Strategic consequences of the revolt ===
Rome had mobilized two consular armies in 218 BC, they planned to send consul Publius Cornelius Scipio with 4 legions (8,000 Roman and 14,000 allied infantry and 600 Roman and 1,600 allied horse) under the escort of 60 quinqueremes to Spain. Scipio was to engage Hannibal either north of the Ebro or east of the Pyrenees or on the Rhône, and after Scipio had occupied Hannibal's forces, Consul Tiberius Sempronius Longus with 4 legions (2 Romans and 2 allied, 8,000 Roman and 16,000 allied infantry and 600 Roman and 1,800 allied horse) under the escort of 160 quinqueremes was to invade Africa and attack Carthage.

Hannibal had anticipated Rome's intentions, and may have planned to defeat Scipio in Spain or Gaul before invading Italy, thus securing Carthage's Spanish possessions and forestalling the planned Roman invasion of Africa. Probably starting in late May or early June, the Carthaginian army spent almost three months moving from Cartagena to the Pyrenees, including a 43-day campaign conquering Catalonia. Hannibal was denied his planned confrontation with Scipio, whose journey to Spain was delayed by the Gallic revolt.

=== Gauls retire from Mutina ===
The Roman Senate prioritized the defense of Italy over the planned overseas expeditions, and Praetor Peregrinus Lucius Manlius Vulso marched from Ariminium with 600 Roman Horse, 10,000 allied infantry and 1,000 allied cavalry, all taken from Scipio's army, to aid the besieged Romans at Mutina. This army was ambushed by the Gauls twice on the way, losing 1,200 men and six standards, and although they relieved Mutina, the combined Roman army then fell under a loose siege a few miles from Mutina at Tannetum. The Senate now detached one Roman and one allied legion (10,000 men) from the army of Scipio again, and Praetor Urbanus Gaius Atillius Serranus marched to Cisalpine Gaul with this army. As Atillius neared Tannetum, the Gauls retired without battle, and the Romans spent the summer of 218 BC recovering and fortifying Placentia and Cremona. The army of Sepmronius, kept in Rome as a strategic reserve, left Rome in June or July for Sicily. Scipio was forced to raise and train new troops to replace the ones taken from him, which delayed his departure for Spain by two-three months. This delay, a direct consequence of the Gallic revolt, indirectly influenced the course of Hannibal's invasion of Italy.

=== Hannibal’s arrival in Cisalpine Gaul ===
A generic representation of the route Hannibal and Publius Scipio took to the Po Valley 218 BC, not to exact scale

Hannibal after subduing Catalonia left Hanno with 11,000 soldiers to guard the area, further reduced his army, abandoned his heavy baggage, and focused on reaching Italy quickly, his streamlined army reached the Rhone in three weeks, forced a passage across the river against Gallic resistance only to find Scipio's army stationed four days march to the south of his crossing site– another consequence of Scipio's delayed start from Italy. Hannibal chose not to fight the Romans, but he probably was forced to change his planned route across Alps due to the Roman presence, and his five-week crossing of the Alps using an alternate, more arduous route caused the loss of the majority of his pack animals and 12,000 to 20,000 irreplaceable, battle tested, loyal veteran soldiers, who might have augmented Hannibal's strength in Italy, another indirect consequence of Scipio's delayed arrival in Gaul. The Carthaginians found no supplies and reinforcements from the Gauls awaiting them after entering Italy, the Gauls joined the Carthaginians only after Hannibal defeated the Taurini three days after reaching Italy. Hannibal wintered in Cisalpine Gaul after his victories in the battle of Ticinus and Trebia, and when he marched south in spring of 217 BC, more than half of his army consisted of Gallic recruits.

== Prelude ==
Consul Gnaeus Servilius Geminus had attacked the Boii after the departure of Hannibal from Cisalpine Gaul in 217 BC, but Hannibal's victory in the Battle of Lake Trasimene forced him to move south to defend Central Italy. The Boii and Insubres were left in peace until the Romans decided to attack both Hannibal and the Gauls in 216 BC. Roman consuls for 216 BC, Lucius Aemilius Paullus and Gaius Terentius Varro gave one Roman legion to Lucius Postumius Albinus to harry the Gallic tribes in Cisalpine Gaul that had supplied troops to Hannibal's Carthaginian army and the Romans probably hoped that with their homeland under attack, the Gauls in Hannibal's army may desert and move back to Cisalpine Gaul, reducing the Carthaginian army's strength considerably. Postumius' army strength was increased to two Roman legions and he further raised allied troops along the Adriatic coast, raising the number of his soldiers to 25,000 troops.

== Opposing armies ==
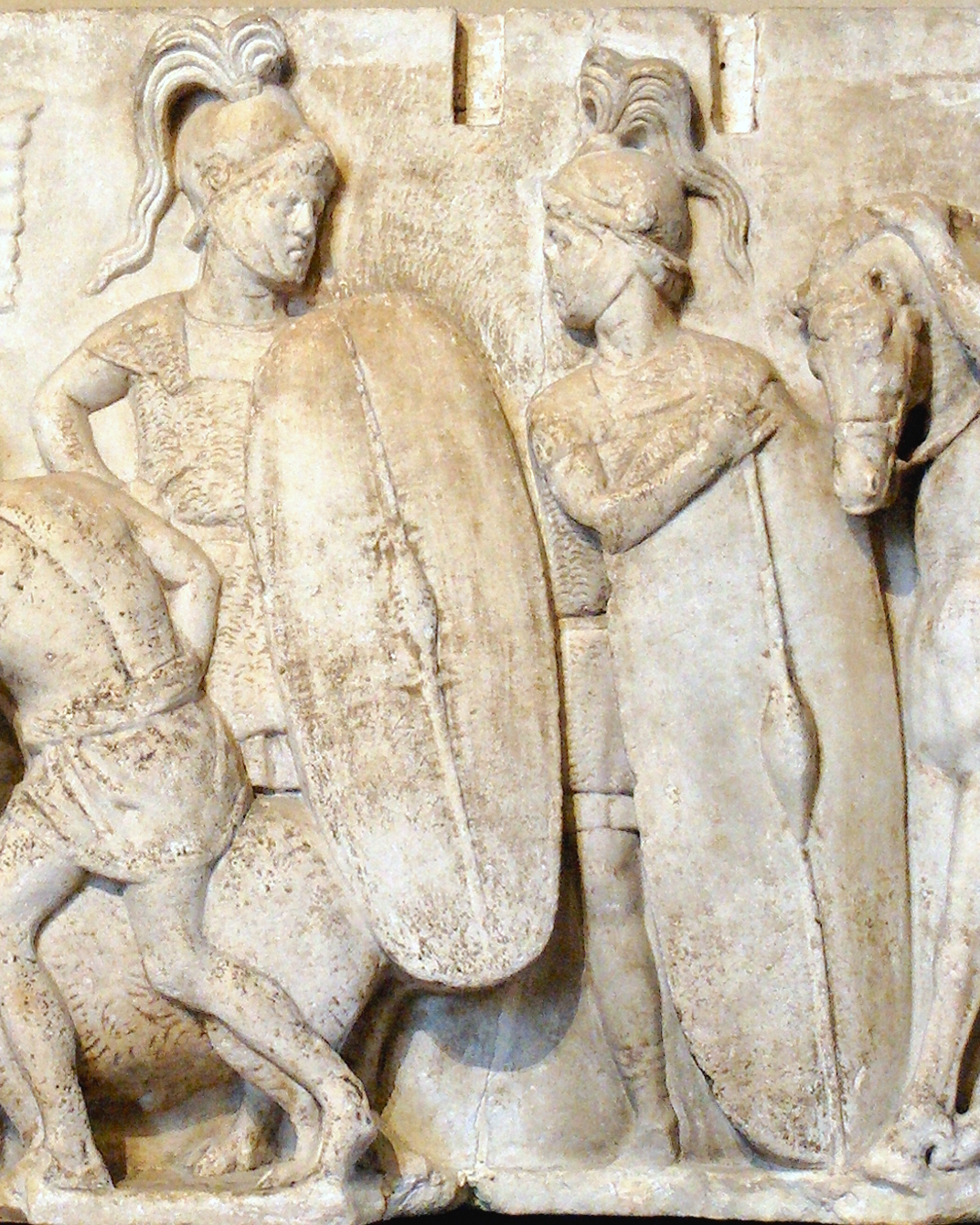
Detail from the Ahenobarbus relief showing two Roman foot-soldiers from the second century BC

Most male Roman citizens were eligible for military service and would serve as infantry, a better-off minority providing a cavalry component. Traditionally, when at war the Romans would raise two legions, each of 4,200 infantry (Note: This could be increased to 5,000 in some circumstances, or, rarely, even more.) and 300 cavalry. Approximately 1,200 of the infantry, poorer or younger men unable to afford the armour and equipment of a standard legionary, served as javelin-armed skirmishers, known as velites. They carried several javelins, which would be thrown from a distance, a short sword, and a 90 centimetres (3.0 ft) shield. The balance were equipped as heavy infantry, with body armour, a large shield and short thrusting swords. They were divided into three ranks, of which the front rank also carried two javelins, while the second and third ranks had a thrusting spear instead. Both legionary sub-units and individual legionaries fought in relatively open order. It was the long-standing Roman procedure to elect two men each year, known as consuls, to each lead an army. An army was usually formed by combining a Roman legion with a similarly sized and equipped legion provided by their Latin allies; allied legions usually had a larger attached complement of cavalry than Roman ones.

=== The Gauls ===
The Gauls were brave, fierce warriors who fought in tribes and clans in massed infantry formation, but lacked the discipline of their Roman and Carthaginian opponents. The Infantry wore no armor, fought naked or stripped to the waist in plaid trousers and a loose cloak, a variety of different size and shaped metal bossed shields made of oak or linden covered with leather and iron slashing swords, both cavalry and Infantry carried spears and javelins for close quarter and ranged combat. Chieftains, Noblemen, and their retainers made up the cavalry, wore helmets and mail, and used thrusting spears and swords.

== Battle ==
Postumius' army invaded Cisalpine Gaul in the spring of 215 BC, and marched through a large forest called Litana by the Gauls towards the Boii strongholds. The Boii had prepared an ambush for the Romans, they cut the trees along the path taken by the Romans in such a way that, unsupported, the trees would remain standing, but if given a slight push they would topple over. The Gauls had somehow managed to conceal their activity from the Romans, or the Roman scouts had failed to detect the Gauls in their vicinity. As the Romans advanced along the road, the Boii secured a perimeter outside their line of advance and pushed over the trees on the outer edges, the trees fell on each other and crashed onto the road from both sides, killing several Roman soldiers and horses and destroying their equipment, while most of the soldiers died under the weight of the trees' trunks and branches and the panicked survivors were slaughtered by the Boii waiting outside the forest. A party of Romans tried to escape across a river, but were captured by the Boii who had already taken the bridge over it, only ten men survived the disaster, and a vast amount of spoils were taken by the Boii. Postumius was killed, his body decapitated and his head taken to a Boii sacred temple, where the skin was scraped off and the bare skull covered with gold, which was used as a cup for drinking by the Boii high priest.

== Aftermath ==
The city of Rome was panic stricken after receiving news of this disaster, as Rome was now open to another Gallic invasion from the north as no legions were stationed in Central Italy, Rome itself was guarded by two city legions, Roman preparations against Hannibal after the Battle of Cannae were just being completed, and no soldiers could be spared from these deployment for service elsewhere. The Roman Senate ordered aediles to patrol the streets, open shops and disperse any sign of defeatism. Postumius had been elected Roman consul for the third time and in absentia, since he was in command of the Roman legion in Cisalpine Gaul, and the Republic now needed to elect another consul as his replacement. Tiberius Sempronius Gracchus, the remaining consul-elect for 215 BC, consoled the Senate by emphasizing the importance of defeating Hannibal, with the Gauls being only a secondary priority for the Roman war strategy. The Senate accordingly garrisoned Arretium with a legion under praetor M. Pomponius, and Gaius Terentius Varro, who had survived the Battle of Cannae and was now a proconsul, was stationed at Ager Picenus with the task of raising additional troops and garrisoning the area, and both generals were ordered not to conduct any offensive operations.

The Boii did not attack the Roman colonies of Placentia and Cremona in Cisalpine Gaul after their victory, sparing Rome from mobilizing relief forces or abandoning their colonies altogether at a time when they were hard pressed combating Hannibal. The Gauls remained passive until 207 BC, which enabled Placentia and Cremona to meet their annual quota of sending supplies to Rome, even in 209 BC, when eighteen out of the thirty Roman Latin Rights colonies were unable to supply their required quota of money or soldiers, which indicates that the Gauls were not engaged in any hostility in Cisalpine Gaul during 216–207 BC.

== Strategic importance ==
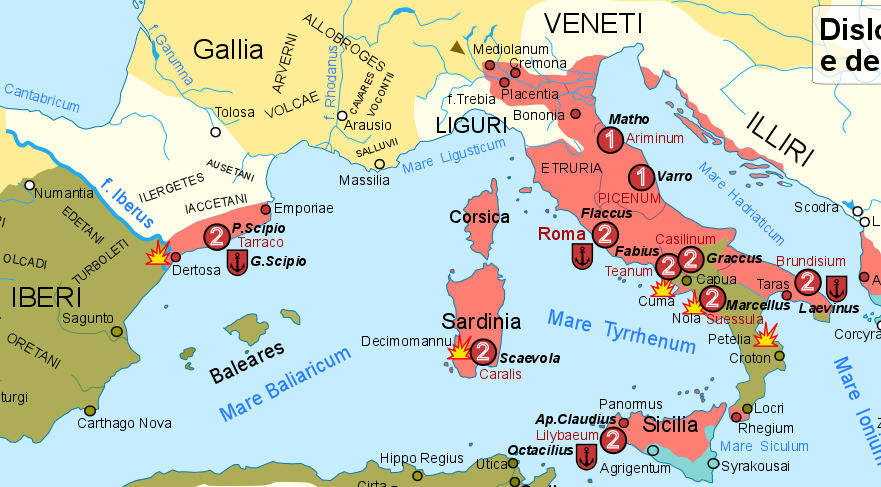
The locations of Roman legions in 215 BC; of the 18 raised, only 2 were in Iberia, supported by at least 4 Italian legions and Iberian allies.

The Gallic victory and the subsequent Roman decision to deploy minimal forces to guard Cisalpine Gaul created an unexpected strategic opportunity for Hasdrubal Barca, who had been ordered to march overland to Italy after destroying the Roman forces stationed in Spain by the Carthaginian Senate in 215 BC. Hasdrubal had previously attempted to reinforce Hannibal in Italy in 217 BC, but the defeat of Hasdrubal's navy in the Battle of Ebro River had caused him to abandon this enterprise. Hasdrubal, reinforced by 4,500 soldiers, was occupied with subduing Iberian rebels based near Gades in 216 BC and was unable to leave Spain. Carthage sent an army and fleet under Himilco to guard Spain in 216 BC, which enabled Hasdrubal, in command of an army probably numbering 25,000, to start preparing his expedition to Italy.

Hannibal Barca, during 218–216 BC, had defeated the Romans in several battles and plundered his way across Central Italy to demonstrate to Rome's Italian allies Roman inability to protect them as part of his strategy, and after winning at Cannae, Hannibal gained several allies in South Italy, which denied Rome a large part of their resources and these defecting cities now supplied the Carthaginians with men and supplies, as Hannibal had planned. Hannibal now needed further reinforcements to protect his Italian allies and carry the war to the territory of Rome and her remaining allies.

The Carthaginian Senate had authorized sending 4,000 Numidian cavalry, 40 elephants and 500 talents to Hannibal, Mago Barca, brother of Hannibal then in present Carthage, was authorized to recruit another army containing 20,000 infantry and 4,000 cavalry, and then sail to Italy to reinforce Hannibal. If Hasdrubal had managed to arrive in north Italy in 215 BC with his army, and then augment his numbers with Ligurian and Gallic recruits, he would have been in a position to attack Central Italy from the north, together with the reinforced army of Hannibal advancing from the south while other Carthaginian armies guarded Hannibal's allies in southern Italy. This would have caught Rome and her remaining allies in a strategic pincer movement. Rome probably would not have been able to survive the impact of Hasdrubal and Mago Barca's armies operating in Italy, but the defeat of Hasdrubal Barca in the Battle of Ibera not only prevented this, but also diverted the army of Mago Barca to Spain and spared Rome this ordeal.

== Sources ==
- Bagnall, Nigel (1999). The Punic Wars: Rome, Carthage and the Struggle for the Mediterranean. London: Pimlico. ISBN 978-0-7126-6608-4.
- Baker, G. P. (1999). Hannibal. Cooper Square Press. ISBN 0-8154-1005-0.
- Bath, Tony (1981). Hannibal's Campaigns. Barns & Nobles, New York. ISBN 0-88029-817-0.
- Cornell, T. J. (1995). The Beginnings of Rome: Italy and Rome from the Bronze Age to the Punic Wars. The Routledge History of the Ancient World. London: Routledge. ISBN 978-0415015967.
- Daly, Gregory (2002). Cannae: The Experience of Battle in the Second Punic War. London: Routledge. ISBN 978-0-415-26147-0.
- Dodge, Theodore A. (1994) [1891]. Hannibal. Da Capo Press. ISBN 0-306-81362-9.
- Eckstein, Arthur M. (1987). Senate and General. University of California Press. ISBN 0-520-05582-9.
- Florus (1889). Epitome of Roman History . Trans. John Selby Watson. London: George Bell & Sons – via Wikisource.
- Fox, Robin Lane (2005). The Classical World. Penguin Books. ISBN 0-14-102141-1.
- Gabriel, Richard A. (2011). Hannibal. Potomac Books Inc. ISBN 978-1-59797-686-2.
- Goldsworthy, Adrian (2006). The Fall of Carthage: The Punic Wars 265–146 BC. London: Phoenix. ISBN 978-0-304-36642-2.
- Goldworthy, Adrian (2000). The Fall of Carthage. -London: Phoenix. ISBN 9780304366422.
- Hoyos, Dexter (2003). Hannibal's Dynasty: Power and Politics in the Western Mediterranean, 247–183 BC. New York: Routledge. ISBN 0-203-41782-8.
- Lancel, Serge (1998). Hannibal. Translated by Nevill, Antonia. Blackwell Publishers. ISBN 0-631-21848-3.
- Lazenby, John Francis (1978). Hannibal's War. Aris & Phillips. ISBN 0-85668-080-X.
- Livius, Titus (2006). Hannibal's War: Books Twenty-One to Thirty. Translated by J.C. Yardley, introduction and notes by Dexter Hoyos. Oxford: Oxford University Press. ISBN 0-19-283159-3.
- Miles, Richard (2011). Carthage Must Be Destroyed. Penguin Group. ISBN 978-0-141-01809-6.
- Pennell, Robert Franklin (2004) [1894]. Ancient Rome: From the earliest times down to 476 A. D. (Revised ed.). Boston, Chicago: Allyn and Bacon, Project Gutenberg.
- Polybius (1922) [c. 170–140 BC]. Histories. Loeb Classical Library. Translated by Paton, W. R. Harvard University Press, W. Heinemann – via LacusCurtius.
- Scullard, Howard H. (1930). Scipio Africanus in the Second Punic War. Cambridge: Cambridge University Press. OCLC 185176196.
- Scullard, Howard H. (2006) [1989]. "Carthage and Rome". In Walbank, F. W.; Astin, A. E.; Frederiksen, M. W. & Ogilvie, R. M. (eds.). Cambridge Ancient History: Volume 7, Part 2, 2nd Edition. Cambridge: Cambridge University Press. pp. 486–569. ISBN 978-0-521-23446-7.
- Strabo (1917) [c. 7 BC–18 AD]. Geography. Loeb Classical Library. Translated by Jones, H. L. Harvard University Press, W. Heinemann – via LacusCurtius.
- Zimmermann, Klaus (2015) [2011]. "Roman Strategy and Aims in the Second Punic War". In Hoyos, Dexter (ed.). A Companion to the Punic Wars. Oxford: Wiley-Blackwell. pp. 280–298. ISBN 978-1-405-17600-2.
