= Marcus Publicius Malleolus =

Marcus Publicius Malleolus was a Roman statesman who served as Consul.

He built, with his brother, a temple dedicated to the goddess Flora and instituted the Floralia. He was elected Consul in 232 BC with Marcus Aemilius Lepidus. They served during a transition period between the First and the Second Punic War.

== Bibliography ==
- William Smith, Dictionary of Greek and Roman Biography and Mythology, 1, Boston: Little, Brown and Company, Vol.2 p. 908 n.1

Political offices
Preceded by Quintus Fabius Maximus Verrucosus; Manius Pomponius Matho	Roman consul 232 BC; With: Marcus Aemilius Lepidus	Succeeded by Marcus Pomponius Matho; Gaius Papirius Maso
