= Manius Pomponius Matho =

Roman general and senator

Manius Pomponius Matho (fl. 236 – 211 BC) was a Roman general who was elected consul for the year 233 BC with Quintus Fabius Maximus Verrucosus. He was also the maternal grandfather of the general and statesman Scipio Africanus.

== Career ==
During his consulship, Matho carried on the war against the Sardinians and was granted a triumph for his victory over them. However, this victory was incomplete, because the war was continued by his brother Marcus, consul in 231 BC.

In 217 BC, he was apparently chosen magister equitum (Eng. "master of the horse") to the dictator, Lucius Veturius Philo, and was elected praetor for the following year, 216 BC. There seems no reason for believing that the Matho, praetor of this year, was a different person from the consul of 233 BC, as the Romans were now at war with Hannibal, and were therefore anxious to appoint to the great offices of the state generals who had had experience in war. The lot, however, did not give any military command to Matho, but the jurisdictio inter cives Romanos et peregrines.

After news had been received of the fatal battle of Cannae, Matho and his colleague, the praetor urbanus, summoned the senate to the curia Hostilia to deliberate on what steps were to be taken. At the expiration of his office, Matho received as propraetor the province of Cisalpine Gaul, in 215 BC, for Livy says (xxiv. 10), in the next year, 214 BC, that the province of Gaul was continued to him. Livy, however, not only makes no mention of Matho's appointment in 215 BC, but expressly states (xxiii. 25) that in that year no army was sent into Gaul on account of the want of soldiers. We can only reconcile these statements by supposing that Matho was appointed to the province but did not obtain any troops that year. He died in 211 BC, at which time he was one of the pontifices (Liv. xxvi. 23). He was succeeded in that office by Gaius Livius Salinator.

== Family ==
Matho was the brother of Marcus Pomponius Matho, consul in 231 BC who died in 204 BC. Either man, but probably the latter, was the father of Marcus Pomponius Matho, plebeian aedile in 206 BC, who was ordered to investigate the complaints of the Locrians against his kinsman Scipio Africanus.

Matho is best known as the grandfather of the great Roman general Scipio Africanus. His daughter Pomponia was the wife of Publius Cornelius Scipio, a consul in 218 BC (killed in 211 BC).

According to William Smith, relying on Cicero, the name Matho was pronounced without the "h" and was sometimes written as Mato.

Political offices
Preceded by Lucius Postumius Albinus; Spurius Carvilius Maximus Ruga	Roman consul 233 BC; With: Quintus Fabius Maximus Verrucosus	Succeeded by Marcus Aemilius Lepidus; Marcus Publicius Malleolus
