= Marcus Postumius Pyrgensis =

Marcus Postumius, surnamed Pyrgensis, is described by Livius as a "farmer of the taxes" during the Second Punic War, whose character for avarice and fraud were equaled only by Titus Pomponius Veientanus.

During this period, when Rome and her allies had many troops in the field, and it was necessary to transport goods to them by sea, the state assumed all risks on behalf of private suppliers, such as Postumius and Pomponius, insuring them against all losses to their ships caused by storms. Taking advantage of their position, they outfitted unseaworthy ships with small and mostly worthless cargoes, sent them to sea, then removed the crews and sank them, reporting the loss while exaggerating the value of the cargo. They also reported imaginary shipwrecks.

This fraud was first reported in 213 B.C., but the Senate had delayed action for fear of offending other suppliers, who depended on the assurances of the state against loss. Pomponius was captured by Hanno that same year. In 212, the tribunes Spurius and Lucius Carvilius proposed to fine Postumius 200,000 asses. On the day of his trial, Postumius' supporters nearly came to blows with those who had assembled to vote. Another tribune, Gaius Servilius Casca, who was a relative of Postumius, failed to intervene on his behalf, and in order to avoid an insurrection, the proceedings were halted by the consul Quintus Fulvius Flaccus.

The matter was then brought before the Senate by the consuls, who argued that Postumius and his allies had robbed the people of their right to vote. The Carvilii then brought a capital charge against Postumius and those who had supported him against the crowd. Postumius gave surety, but chose to go into exile rather than appear for trial before the first of May. Many of his supporters did likewise, while those who could not give surety were immediately imprisoned, together with some of those who could.

== See also ==
- Postumia gens
