= Gymnasium Paulinum =

German school

Coordinates: 51.960°N 7.617°E

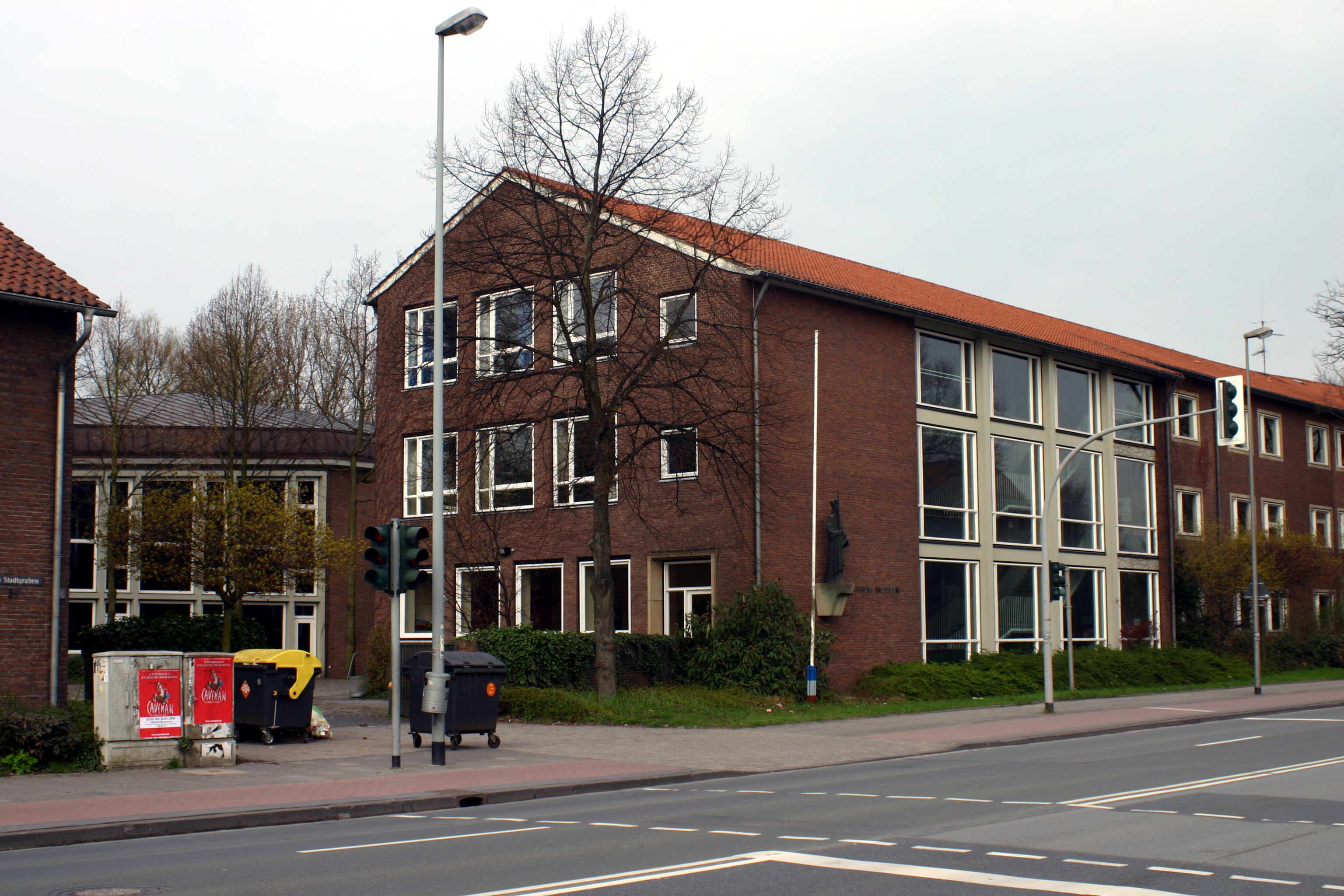

Location
- Am Stadtgraben 30; 51°57'36.0"N 7°37'02.0"E; 48143 (German); Münster, North Rhine-Westphalia, Germany

Information
- School type: Gymnasium
- Motto: Seit 797 (Since 797)
- Founded: 797
- Founder: Ludger
- Website: https://paulinum.eu

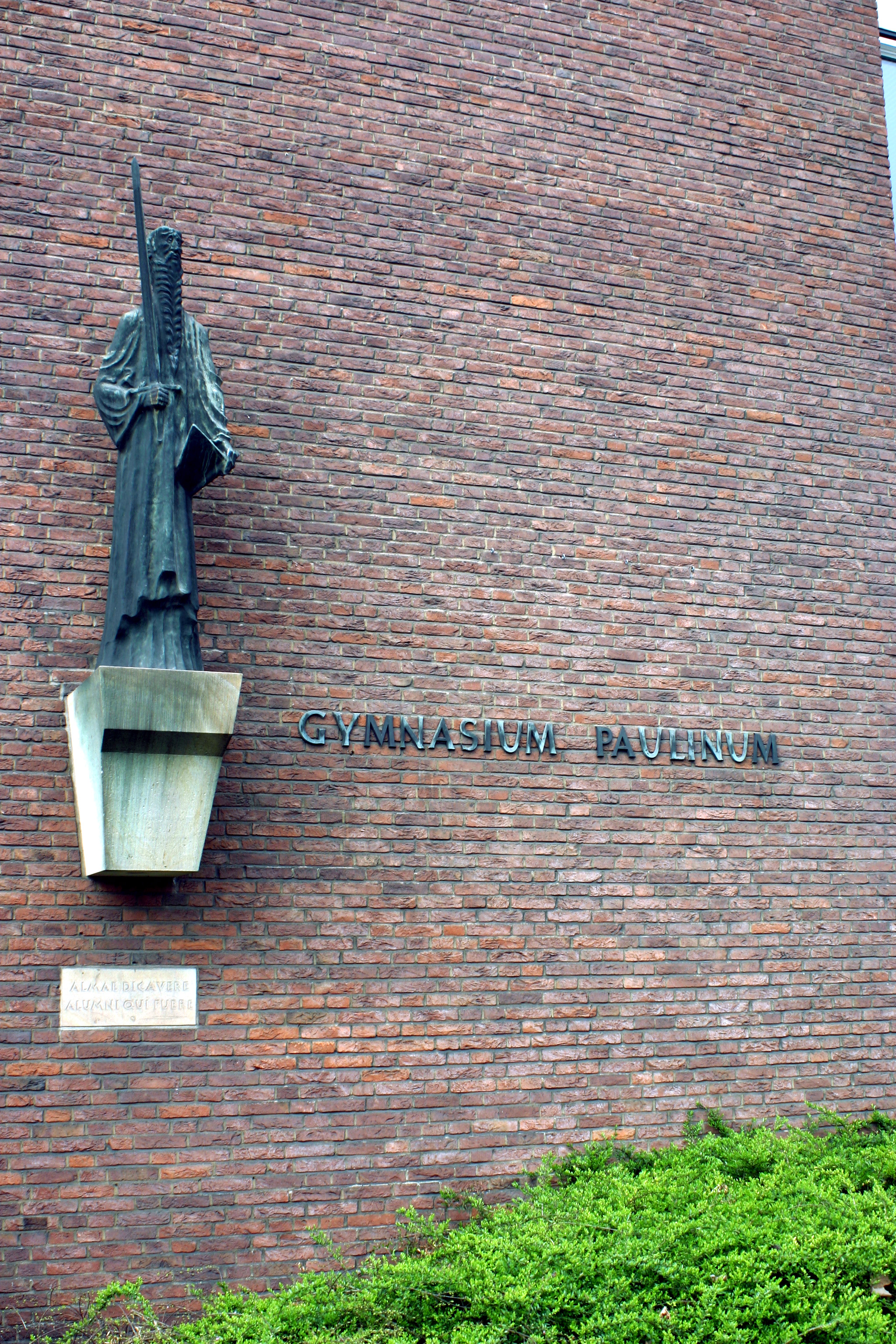

Gymnasium Paulinum is a Gymnasium (secondary) school in Münster, North Rhine-Westphalia, Germany. It was founded in around 797 and is claimed to be the oldest school in Germany.

== Early history ==
Gymnasium Paulinum was established by Ludger the missionary in 797. He had been instructed by Charlemagne in 793 to preach Christianity in north-western Saxony, and subsequently established a monastery in the centre of the former Frankish stronghold of Mimigernaford (also Mimigardeford or Miningarvard), which was later to be known as Münster. He also established a monastic school for future members of the clergy. In 805, when Ludger was appointed Bishop of Münster, the school became a cathedral school. The new "Schola Paulina" was dedicated to St. Paul.

== Latest developments ==
On October 9, 2007, the Gymnasium Paulinum was awarded the title "School of Europe" (Europaschule) as one of the first of 15 schools in the province of North Rhine-Westphalia.

== Notable alumni ==
- Heinrich Brüning, Chancellor of Germany from 1930 to 1932
- Alfred Flechtheim, German Jewish art dealer, art collector, journalist and publisher
- Bernhard von Galen, prince-bishop of Münster
- Johann Glandorp, 16th century humanist, theologian, and scholar
- Leonard Landois, physiologist
- Hermann Löns, journalist and writer
- Josef Pieper, philosopher
- Hans Tietmeyer, economist

== See also ==
- List of Jesuit sites
