= Spurius Carvilius Ruga =

Ancient Roman educator (fl. 230 BC)

Spurius Carvilius Rūga (Latin pronunciation: [s̠purius̠ käru̯ilʲius̠ ruːɡä], fl. 230 BCE) was the freedman of Spurius Carvilius Maximus Ruga. He is often credited with inventing the Latin letter G. His invention would have been quickly adopted in the Roman Republic, because the letter C was used for both the /k/ and /g/ sounds. For example, Ruga's own name (SPVRIVS CARVILIVS RVCA) contained this ambiguity. In the latter half of the 3rd century BC, Ruga is the first man recorded to have been attested as opening a private elementary school, although other such schools may have existed in Rome prior to his.

Plutarch is the main source for these inventions, and Quintus Terentius Scaurus confirms the former in De Orthographia. The letter G was already in use before 230 BC; Wilhelm Paul Corssen theorized in Über Aussprache that Plutarch intended to communicate that Ruga's school was the first to assign C and G to the phonemes of /k/ and /g/.

== See also ==
- Carvilia (gens)
