= Lucius Carvilius =

Lucius Carvilius was tribune of the people at Rome in 212 BC. Together with Spurius Carvilius, perhaps his brother, he proposed that a fine of 200,000 asses be levied against Marcus Postumius Pyrgensis, for defrauding the state. Postumius was one of the "farmers of the taxes", who made their living shipping goods to Roman forces overseas during the Second Punic War. He made a habit of sabotaging his own shipments and claiming losses from these and other imaginary shipwrecks, for which he was re-imbursed by the state.

After Postumius' trial nearly escalated into a riot between the people and his supporters, the Carvilii brought capital charges before the Senate. Postumius gave surety and chose to go into exile rather than appear in person, and many of his supporters likewise chose exile over imprisonment. In this way, Spurius and Lucius Carvilius were able to halt this pernicious drain on the treasury during a critical point in the war.

== See also ==
- Carvilia (gens)
