= Spurius Carvilius (171 BC) =

Spurius Carvilius was sent by Gnaeus Sicinius to Rome in 171 BC, when Perseus despatched an embassy to the Senate. The Senate ordered the ambassadors to quit Italy within eleven days, and Carvilius was appointed to keep watch over them, till they embarked on board their ships.

== See also ==
Carvilia (gens)
