= Gaius Publicius C. f. C. n. Malleolus =

Magistrate of ancient Rome in the 1st century BCE

Gaius Publicius C. f. C. n. Malleolus was a man of ancient Rome who was triumvir monetalis in the late 90s BCE, and later served as quaestor to Cn. Dolabella in Cilicia in 80 BCE.

He died in the province, and was succeeded in his office by Gaius Verres, who also became the tutor of his son. Malleolus had amassed great wealth in the province by plundering the provincials, and, according to the statement of Cicero in his speech In Verrem, Verres took good care to continue and extend this pattern of behavior. Cicero further says that Malleolus was actually killed by Verres, but scholars generally consider this an oratorical exaggeration, not a criminal accusation.
