= Robert Franklin Pennell =

American scholar

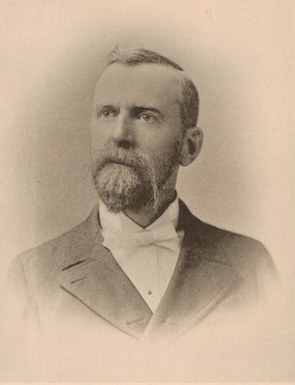

2nd Principal of Chico State Normal School
- In office 1893–1897
- Preceded by: Edward Timothy Pierce
- Succeeded by: Carleton M. Ritter

Personal details
- Born: July 13, 1850 Freeport, Maine
- Died: October 22, 1905 (aged 55) San Francisco, California
- Education: Harvard University

Robert Franklin Pennell (July 13, 1850 – October 22, 1905) was an American educator and classicist.

Pennell was born on July 13, 1850, in Freeport, Maine, to Robert and Caroline Pennell. He graduated from Phillips Exeter Academy in 1868, where his uncle, Gideon Lane Soule, was principal, and from Harvard University in 1871 with a degree in classics. Following his graduation, he became an instructor at Exeter, later teaching Latin. He resigned in 1882, seven years after in 1889 becoming the principal of the Marysville schools in California. From 1890 to 1893 he was president of the Stockton, California, schools, and from 1893 to 1897 he was president of Chico State Normal School. He died on October 22, 1905, in San Francisco, California.

== Works ==
- Ancient Greece, from the earliest times down to the death of Alexander, 1874
- Rome, from the earliest times down to 476 A.D., 1878
- The Latin Subjunctive, 1895

Preceded by Edward Timothy Pierce	President of Chico State Normal School; 1893–1897	Succeeded by Carleton M. Ritter
