= Gnaeus Fulvius Centumalus =

Consul of the Roman Republic
- In office: 229 BC
- Colleague: Lucius Postumius Albinus
- Preceded by: Marcus Aemilius Barbula and Marcus Junius Pera
- Succeeded by: Sp. Carvilius Maximus Ruga and Q. Fabius Maximus Verrucosus

Gnaeus Fulvius Centumalus was consul of the Roman Republic in 229 BC, with Lucius Postumius Albinus as his consular colleague. He led part of the Roman forces in the First Illyrian War against Queen Teuta.

== Biography ==
Centumalus was a member of the gens Fulvia, one of the most illustrious of the plebeian families in Rome at the time. Little is known of his life before or after his consulship, though according to the Fasti Capitolini he shared his name with his grandfather, Gnaeus Fulvius Maximus Centumalus, who had been consul in 298 BC and dictator in 263 BC.

== First Illyrian War ==
Attacks on Italian traders by Illyrian pirates had prompted a Roman embassy to be sent to the court of Queen Teuta of the Ardiaei in 229 BC. After the assassination of one of the ambassadors on Teuta's orders, Rome enrolled legions and prepared a fleet to retaliate. As consul, Fulvius was entrusted with the command of the naval forces and set sail with 200 ships under his command. The fleet travelled to Corcyra where he secured the surrender of the Illyrian garrison and the defection of Demetrius of Pharos.

He then took the fleet to Apollonia, combining his forces with those of Postumius, who had brought 22,000 troops across from Brundisium. After forcing the surrender of cities up the Illyrian coast, the Roman advance forced Teuta to flee to the fortified city of Rhizon. Fulvius and Postumius withdrew to Epidamnus. While Postumius wintered there with 40 ships, Fulvius took the bulk of the army and the rest of the fleet back to Italy. According to the Fasti Triumphales he was awarded a naval Triumph for his victory.

Preceded by Marcus Aemilius Barbula; Marcus Junius Pera	Roman consul 229 BC with Lucius Postumius Albinus	Succeeded by Q. Fabius Maximus Verrucosus II; Sp. Carvilius Maximus Ruga II
