= Spurius Carvilius Maximus Ruga =

Roman politician and general

Spurius Carvilius Maximus Ruga (died 212 BC) was Roman consul in 234 and 228 BC. Spurius Carvilius Ruga, the schoolteacher, was his freedman.

== Consulships ==
The son of Spurius Carvilius Maximus, Carvilius was elected consul with Lucius Postumius Albinus for the year 234 BC. He carried on war with the Corsicans, and then with the Sardinians, over whom he obtained a triumph.

Carvilius was consul a second time in 228 BC with Quintus Fabius Maximus Verrucosus. Cicero reports that he did not object to the proposed agrarian law for dividing the lands of Gallia Cisalpina, although Polybius stated that this law was passed four years earlier.

== Later career ==
Following the disaster of the Cannae, Carvilius noted the greatly diminished numbers of the Senate, and with note to the uncertain loyalty of Rome's Latin allies in the face of Hannibal's invasion, he proposed that two senators should be elected from each of the Latin tribes, thereby filling many vacancies, and uniting the Roman state with her closest allies. This proposal was dismissed with the utmost indignation and contempt.

Carvilius was an augur at the time of his death in 212 BC.

== Divorce ==
Some sources relate that Carvilius was the first person at Rome to have divorced his wife, which he did on grounds of barrenness. His conduct in this matter was generally disapproved. However, it may be noted that the laws of the Twelve Tables provided for divorce more than two centuries before Carvilius.

== Footnotes ==
- Münzer, Friedrich (1899), "Carvilius 10", Realencyclopädie der classischen Altertumswissenschaft (RE, PW), volume 3, part 2, columns 1630–1631.

Political offices
Preceded by Titus Manlius Torquatus; Gaius Atilius Bulbus	Roman consul 234 BC with Lucius Postumius Albinus	Succeeded by Quintus Fabius Maximus Verrucosus; Manius Pomponius Matho
Preceded by Lucius Postumius Albinus; Gnaeus Fulvius Centumalus	Roman consul II; 228 BC with Quintus Fabius Maximus Verrucosus	Succeeded by Publius Valerius Flaccus; Marcus Atilius Regulus
