= Gnaeus Cornelius Dolabella (praetor 81 BC) =

Roman nobleman in 1st century BCE

Gnaeus Cornelius Dolabella was a nobleman of ancient Rome who served as praetor urbanus in 81 BCE, when the cause of Publius Quintius was tried, the subject of Cicero's speech Pro Quinctio, in which he charges Dolabella with having acted unjustly.

The year after that, Dolabella had Cilicia for his province, with C. Malleolus as his quaestor, and the notorious Gaius Verres as his legatus. Dolabella not only tolerated the extortions and robberies committed by these two, but shared in their plunder. He was especially indulgent towards Verres, and, after Malleolus was murdered, he made Verres his proquaestor.

After his return to Rome, Dolabella was accused by Marcus Aemilius Scaurus of extortion in his province, and on that occasion Verres not only deserted his accomplice, but furnished the accuser with all the necessary information, and even spoke himself publicly against Dolabella. Many of the crimes committed by Verres himself were thus attributed to Dolabella, who was therefore condemned, going into exile and leaving his wife and children behind him in great poverty.
