= Lucius Postumius Albinus (consul 234 BC) =

Roman politician and general

Lucius Postumius Albinus (c. 272 BC – 216 BC) was a Roman politician and general of the 3rd century BC who was elected consul three times. Most of our knowledge about his career and his demise comes from Livy's Ab Urbe Condita.

== Biography ==
Albinus was a member of the patrician gens Postumia, and the son of Aulus Postumius Albinus, who was a consul in 242 BC.

He was elected as a consul for the first time in 234 BC, during which he campaigned against the Ligures. It has been conjectured that he was then elected Praetor for the first time in the following year (233 BC). Albinus was then elected as a consul for a second time in 229 BC, during which he and his consular colleague Gnaeus Fulvius Centumalus were engaged in a war against the Illyrian queen Teuta. Albinus commanded the land forces, and gained a number of significant victories during the year. He captured Apollonia and then went to the relief of Epidamnos and Issa, forcing the Illyrians to abandon both sieges. He also managed to subdue a number of local Illyrian tribes before returning to Epidamnos.

Albinus was granted a pro-consular extension to his command in 228 BC, after his term ended, in order to conclude the peace treaty with the Illyrians. Once it had been concluded, he sent legates to the Aetolian and Achaean Leagues, where they explained the reasons for the war and the Roman invasion, as well as the terms of the treaty with Queen Teuta. On his return to Rome, unlike his comrade, he was not granted a triumph to celebrate his victory.

Albinus disappears from the historical record during the next decade, but resurfaced in 216 BC, with the Second Punic War in full swing. The Romans, finding themselves short of experienced military commanders, were forced to recall men such as Albinus to serve during this period of crisis. Consequently, Albinus, who was not even in Rome for the election, was elected praetor for the second time, and given command of the province of Gallia Cisalpina. He led his army of two legions plus reinforcements against the Celtic Boii, who had risen in revolt and declared for Hannibal.

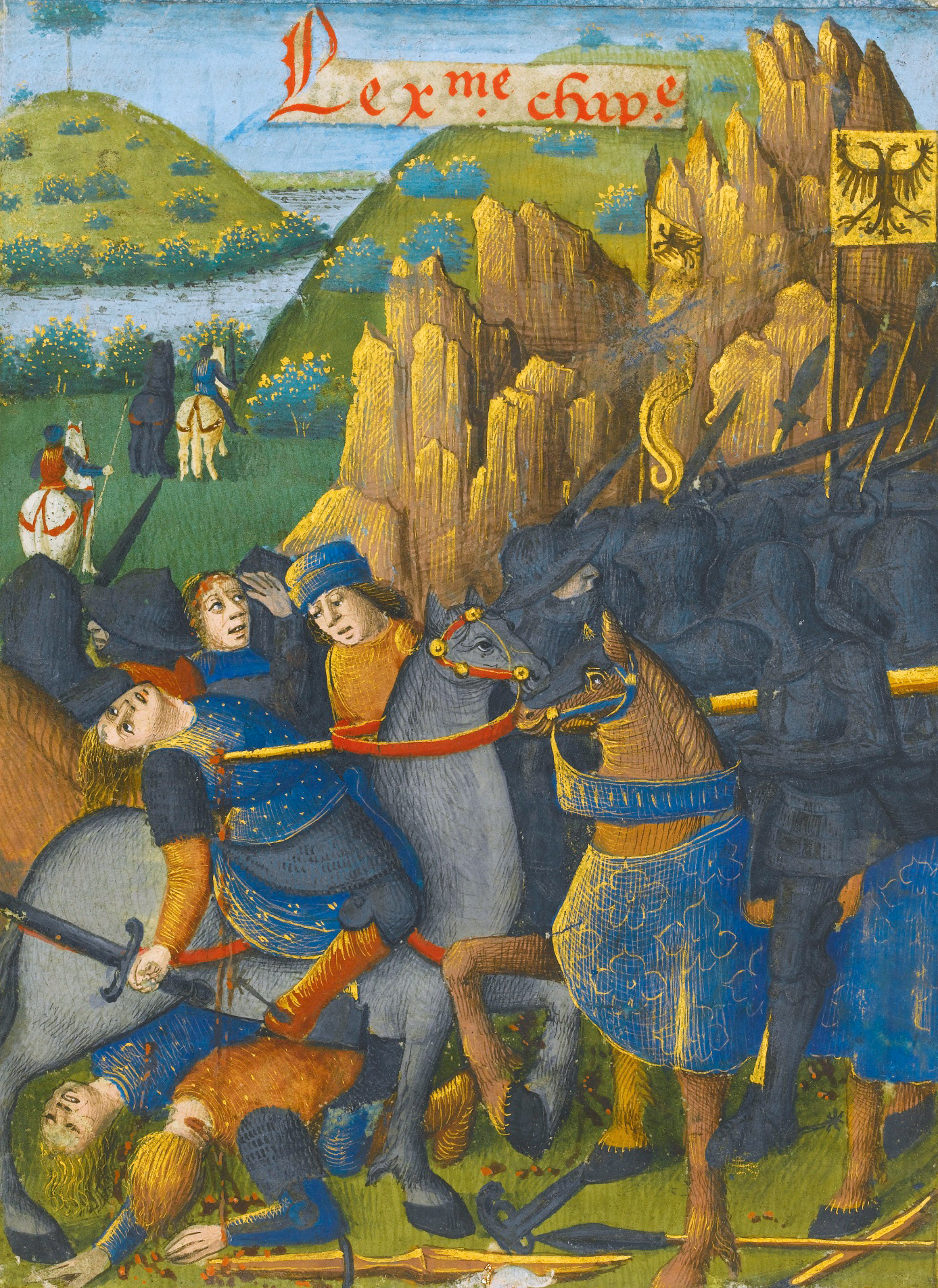
The death of the Roman General Postumius at the hands of the Boii

During his term as a praetor, he was elected in absentia (and whilst on campaign) as a consul for the year 215. However, he did not live to officially enter the consulship. While travelling through the Litana forest in Gallia Cisalpina, Albinus was ambushed by a force of Boii warriors, who annihilated most of his army at the Battle of Silva Litana. Albinus and the remainder of his legions tried to escape over a nearby bridge, but they were slaughtered by a Boii detachment that guarded the crossing. The consul-elect was decapitated, and his skull was then clad in gold and made into a sacrificial bowl. As Livy tells us:

The Boii stripped the body of its spoils and cut off the head, and bore them in triumph to the most sacred of their temples. According to their custom, they cleaned out the skull and covered the scalp with beaten gold; it was then used as a vessel for libations and also as a drinking cup for the priest and ministers of the temple.

When news of Albinus’ death reached Rome, it caused such an alarm that the shops were closed and hardly anyone ventured out of their homes. The Senate ordered the aediles to go around the city and order the citizens to re-open their shops and stop the unofficial public mourning. Albinus’ replacement as consul was Marcus Claudius Marcellus, but his election was declared invalid by the Augurs and he abdicated. Consul for 215 became Quintus Fabius Maximus Verrucosus.

== See also ==
- Postumia gens

== Sources ==
=== Ancient ===
- Livy, History of Rome, Rev. Canon Roberts (translator), Ernest Rhys (Ed.); (1905) London: J. M. Dent & Sons, Ltd.
- Polybius, Histories, Evelyn S. Shuckburgh (translator); London, New York. Macmillan (1889); Reprint Bloomington (1962).

=== Modern ===
- Broughton, T. Robert S., The Magistrates of the Roman Republic, Vol I (1951)
- Smith, William, Dictionary of Greek and Roman Biography and Mythology, Vol I (1867).

== Notes ==
Political offices
Preceded by Titus Manlius Torquatus; Gaius Atilius Bulbus	Roman consul 234 BC with Sp. Carvilius Maximus Ruga	Succeeded by Q. Fabius Maximus Verrucosus; Manius Pomponius Matho
Preceded by Marcus Aemilius Barbula; Marcus Junius Pera	Roman consul 229 BC with Gnaeus Fulvius Centumalus	Succeeded by Q. Fabius Maximus Verrucosus II; Sp. Carvilius Maximus Ruga II
Preceded by Lucius Aemilius Paullus II; Gaius Terentius Varro	Roman consul designate 215 BC with Tiberius Sempronius Gracchus	Succeeded by Marcus Claudius Marcellus III as suffect consul
