= Quintus Fabius Maximus Verrucosus =

Roman statesman and general (c. 280 – 203 BC)

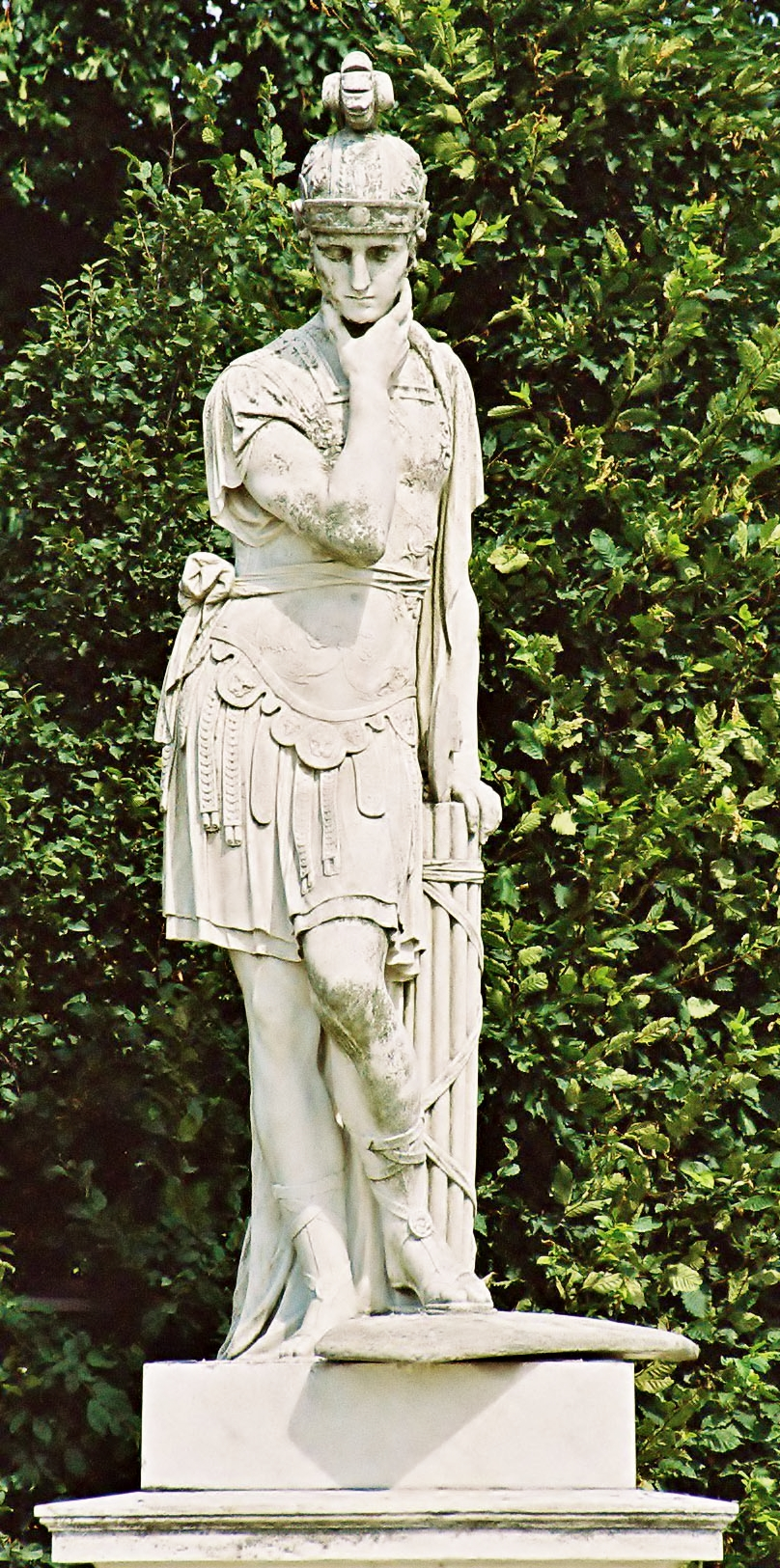
- Fabius Cunctator, statue by J. B. Hagenauer, 1777, at Schönbrunn Palace, Vienna
- Born: c. 280 BC
- Died: 203 BC
- Other name: Cunctator
- Known for: Fabian strategy
- Office: Consul (233, 228, 215, 214, 209 BC); Dictator (221, 217 BC); Censor (230 BC)
- Children: Quintus Fabius Maximus
- Awards: Grass Crown; Roman triumph

Quintus Fabius Maximus Verrucosus (/ˈfeɪbiəs/), surnamed Cunctator (c. 280 – 203 BC), was a Roman statesman and general of the third century BC. He was consul five times (233, 228, 215, 214, and 209 BC) and was appointed dictator in 221 and 217 BC. He was censor in 230 BC. His agnomen, Cunctator, usually translated as "the delayer", refers to the strategy that he employed against Hannibal's forces during the Second Punic War. Facing an outstanding commander with then-superior numbers, he pursued a strategy of targeting the enemy's supply lines and accepting only smaller engagements on favourable ground, rather than risking his entire army on direct confrontation with Hannibal himself. Fabius' actions are among the earliest recorded examples of guerrilla warfare.

== Beginnings ==
Born at Rome c. 280 BC, Fabius was a descendant of the ancient patrician Fabia gens. He was the son or grandson (Note: Livy identifies Verrucosus as the son of Gurges and grandson of Rullianus, but Pliny the Elder and Plutarch call him the great-grandson of Rullianus. Modern scholarship supposes that he was probably the grandson of Gurges, although in this case his father's identity is uncertain. He was probably the son of either the Quintus Fabius Maximus Gurges who was consul in 265 BC, or of the Quintus Fabius who was curule aedile in 267. Traditionally the Gurges who was consul in 265 has been regarded as the same man who had been consul for the first time in 292, and again in 276, in which case Livy may be correct; but some scholars think that the Gurges who was consul in 265 was the son of the consul of 292 and 276; the aedile of 267 may have been his brother or another kinsman.) of Quintus Fabius Maximus Gurges, three times consul and princeps senatus, and grandson or great-grandson of Quintus Fabius Maximus Rullianus, a hero of the Samnite Wars, who like Verrucosus held five consulships, as well as the offices of dictator and censor. Many earlier ancestors had also been consuls. His cognomen, Verrucosus, or "warty", used to distinguish him from other members of his family, derived from a wart on his upper lip.

According to Plutarch, Fabius possessed a mild temper and slow speech. As a child, he learned with difficulty, was cautious in sports and appeared timid in demeanor. Superficially, he seemed hapless, but Plutarch judges these as traits of a prudent and firm mind and a leonine temper. By the time he reached adulthood and was roused by the challenges of public life, his virtues exerted themselves.

While still a youth in 265 BC, Fabius was consecrated an augur. It is unknown whether he participated in the First Punic War, fought between the Roman Republic and Carthage from 264 to 241 BC, or what his role might have been. Fabius' political career began in the years following that war. He was probably quaestor in 237 or 236 BC, and curule aedile about 235. During his first consulship, in 233 BC, Fabius was awarded a triumph for his victory over the Ligurians, whom he defeated and drove into the Alps. He was censor in 230, then consul a second time in 228. It is possible that he held the office of dictator for a first time around this time: according to Livy, Fabius's tenure of the dictatorship in 217 was his second term in that office, with Gaius Flaminius as his deputy and magister equitum during the first term: however Plutarch suggests that Flaminius was deputy instead to Marcus Minucius Rufus – presumably Fabius's great political rival of that name, who later served as deputy to Fabius himself (see below). It is of course possible that Flaminius was successively deputy to both, after Minucius's apparently premature deposition following bad augural omens: and also possible that little of note (other than, possibly, holding elections during the absence of consuls) was accomplished during either dictatorship.

According to Livy, in 218 BC Fabius took part in an embassy to Carthage, sent to demand redress for the capture of the supposedly neutral town of Saguntum in Spain. Fabius then demanded that Hannibal and his officers would be turned over to Roman custody. The Carthaginian senate refused and Fabius held up two ends of his toga, one stood for peace, the other for war. He let the Carthaginian senate choose but they insisted that Fabius would decide. After the delegation had received the Carthaginians' reply, it was Fabius himself who, addressing the Carthaginian senate, issued a formal declaration of war between Carthage and the Roman Republic. However, Cassius Dio, followed by Zonaras, calls the ambassador Marcus Fabius, suggesting that it was his cousin, Marcus Fabius Buteo, who issued the declaration of war against the Carthaginians.

== Dictatorship during the Second Punic War ==
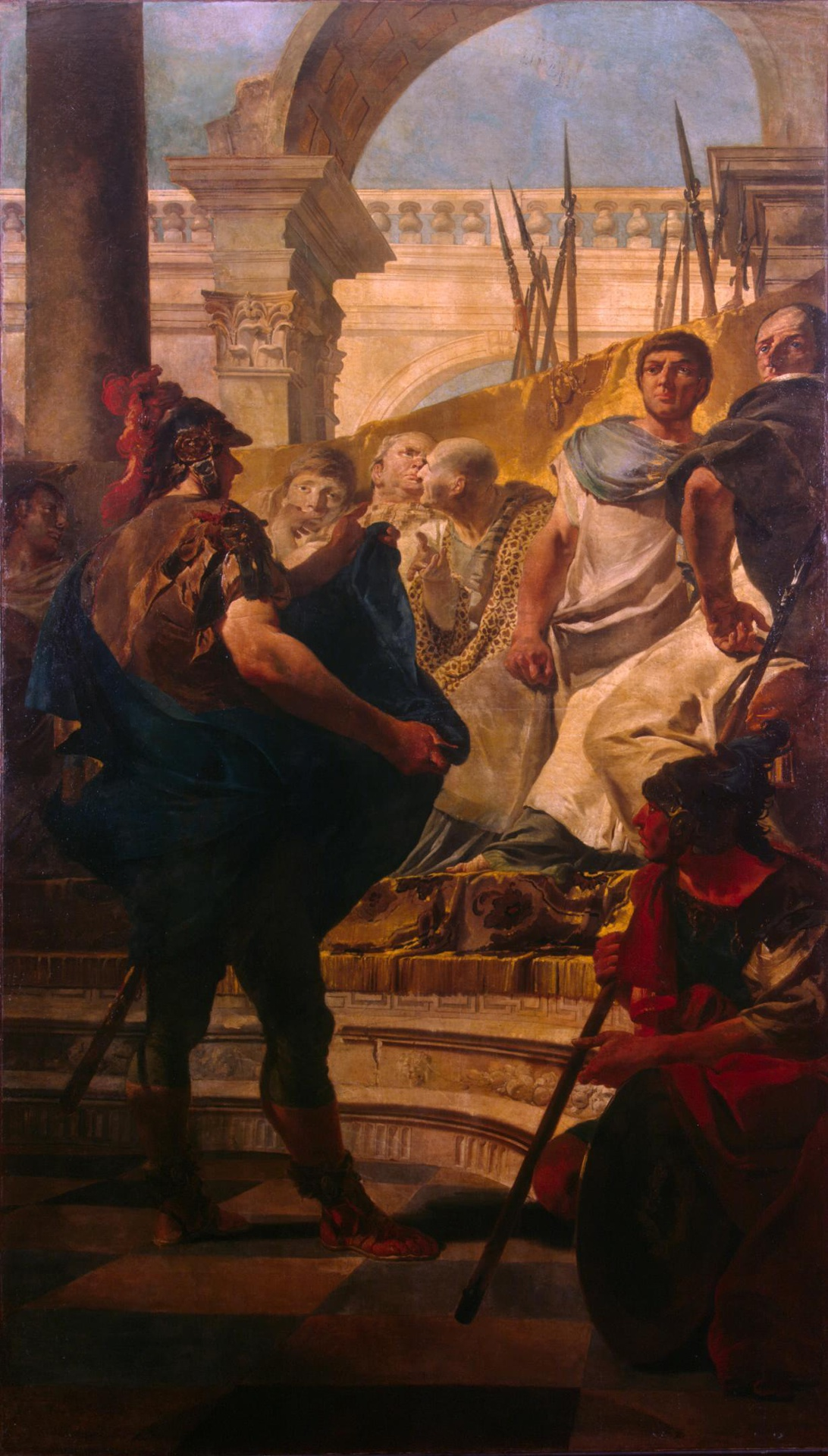
Quintus Fabius Maximus Before the Senate of Carthage, ca. 1727, Hermitage Museum

Roman diplomacy and omens, Winter 217–216 BC

When the consul Tiberius Sempronius Longus was defeated in the Battle of the Trebia in December 218 BC, Fabius advised that the Romans should simply bide their time and deny Hannibal any chance at a general engagement, instead letting the invasion peter out while making sure the cities of their Italian Allies were supported or protected. However, consul Gaius Flaminius opposed this plan and joined his colleague Gnaeus Servilius Geminus in raising two consular armies to confront Hannibal in central Italy. Flaminius' plan came to a disastrous end when he was killed during the decisive Roman defeat at the Battle of Lake Trasimene in 217 BC, with panic sweeping Rome.

With consular armies destroyed in these two major battles, and Hannibal approaching Rome's gates, the Romans feared the imminent destruction of their city. The Roman Senate decided to appoint a dictator and chose Fabius for the role – possibly for the second time, though evidence of a previous term is inconclusive – in part due to his advanced age and experience. However, he was not allowed to appoint his own Magister Equitum; instead, the Senate chose a political enemy, Marcus Minucius.

Fabius sought to calm the Roman people promptly by asserting himself as a strong dictator, in a crisis perceived as the worst in Roman history. He asked the Senate for permission to ride on horseback, an act expressively forbidden by Roman law. He also insisted on being accompanied by a full complement of twenty-four lictors, and ordered the surviving consul, Gnaeus Servilius Geminus, to dismiss his lictors (in essence, acknowledging the seniority of the dictator), and to present himself before Fabius as a private citizen.

Plutarch tells us that Fabius believed that the disaster at Lake Trasimene was due, in part, to the fact that the gods had become neglected. Before that battle, a series of omens had been witnessed, including a series of lightning bolts, which Fabius had believed were warnings from the gods. He had warned Flaminius of this, but Flaminius had ignored the warnings. And so Fabius, as dictator, next sought to please the gods. He ordered a massive sacrifice of the whole product of the next harvest season throughout Italy, in particular that of cows, goats, swine, and sheep. In addition, he ordered that musical festivities be celebrated, and then told his fellow citizens to each spend a precise sum of 333 sestertii and 333 denarii. Plutarch isn't sure exactly how Fabius came up with this number, although he believes it was to honor the perfection of the number three, as it is the first of the odd numbers and one of the first of the prime numbers. It is not known if Fabius truly believed that these actions had won the gods over to the Roman side, although the actions probably did (as intended) convince the average Roman that the gods had finally been won over.

=== Fabian strategy ===
Fabius respected Hannibal's military genius and so refused to engage him directly in pitched battle. Instead, he kept his troops close to Hannibal, hoping to exhaust him in a long war of attrition. Fabius was able to harass the Carthaginian foraging parties, limiting Hannibal's ability to wreak destruction while conserving his own military force, and implementing a "scorched earth" practice to prevent Hannibal's forces from obtaining grain and other resources.

The Romans were unimpressed with this defensive strategy and at first gave Fabius his epithet Cunctator (delayer) as an insult. The strategy was in part ruined because of a lack of unity in the command of the Roman army, since Fabius' Master of the Horse, Minucius, was a political enemy of Fabius. At one point, Fabius was called by the priests to assist with certain sacrifices, so Fabius left the command of the army in the hands of Minucius during his absence. Fabius had told Minucius not to attack Hannibal in his absence, but Minucius disobeyed and attacked anyway.

The attack, though of no strategic value, resulted in the retreat of several enemy units, and so the Roman people, desperate for good news, believed Minucius to be a hero. On hearing of this, Fabius became enraged, and as dictator, could have ordered Minucius' execution for his disobedience. One of the plebeian tribunes (chief representatives of the people) for the year, Metilius, was a partisan of Minucius, and as such he sought to use his power to help Minucius. The plebeian tribunes were the only officials independent of the dictator, and so with his protection, Minucius was relatively safe. Plutarch states that Metilius "boldly applied himself to the people in the behalf of Minucius", and had Minucius granted powers equivalent to those of Fabius. By this, Plutarch probably means that as a plebeian tribune, Metilius had the Plebeian Council, a popular assembly which only tribunes could preside over, grant Minucius quasi-dictatorial powers.

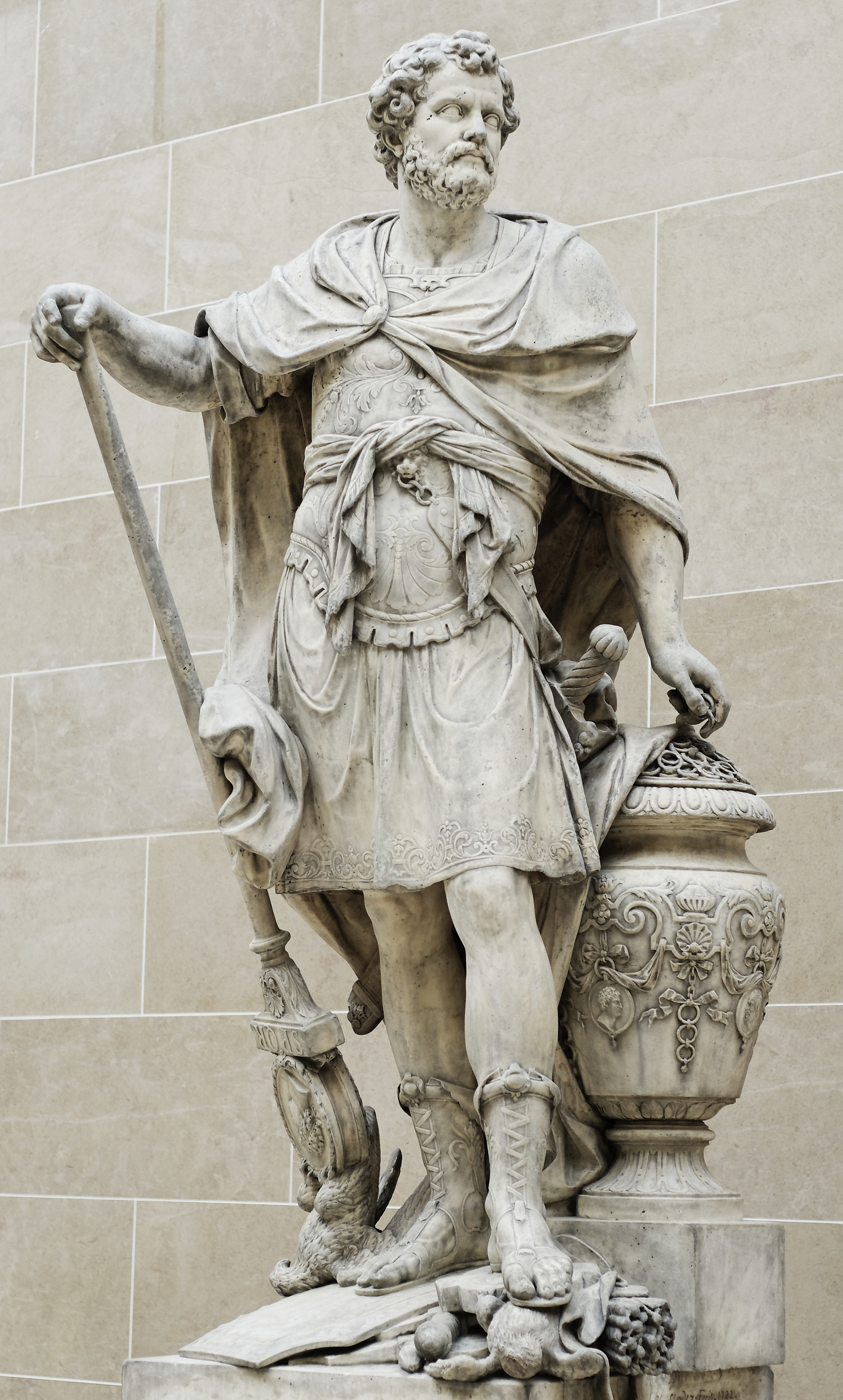
Hannibal counting the rings of the Roman senators killed during the Battle of Cannae, statue by Sébastien Slodtz, 1704, Louvre

Fabius did not attempt to fight the promotion of Minucius, but rather decided to wait until Minucius' rashness caused him to run headlong into some disaster. He realized what would happen when Minucius was defeated in battle by Hannibal. Fabius, we are told, reminded Minucius that it was Hannibal, and not he, who was the enemy. Minucius proposed that they share the joint control of the army, with command rotating between the two every other day. Fabius rejected this, and instead let Minucius command half of the army, while he commanded the other half. Minucius openly claimed that Fabius was cowardly because he failed to confront the Carthaginian forces.

Near Larinum in Samnium, Hannibal had taken up position in a town called Geronium. In the leadup to the Battle of Geronium, Minucius decided to make a broad frontal attack on Hannibal's troops in the valley between Larinum and Geronium. Several thousand men were involved on either side. It appeared that the Roman troops were winning, but Hannibal had set a trap. Soon the Roman troops were being slaughtered. Upon seeing the ambush of Minucius' army, Fabius cried "O Hercules! how much sooner than I expected, though later than he seemed to desire, hath Minucius destroyed himself!" On ordering his army to join the battle and rescue their fellow Romans, Fabius exclaimed "we must make haste to rescue Minucius, who is a valiant man, and a lover of his country."

Fabius rushed to his co-commander's assistance and Hannibal's forces immediately retreated. After the battle, there was some feeling that there would be conflict between Minucius and Fabius; however, the younger soldier marched his men to Fabius' encampment and is reported to have said, "My father gave me life. Today you saved my life. You are my second father. I recognize your superior abilities as a commander." When Fabius' term as dictator ended, consular government was restored, and Gnaeus Servilius Geminus and Marcus Atilius Regulus assumed the consulship for the remainder of the year.

The once-looked-down-upon tactics employed by Fabius came then to be respected. It is said, asserts Plutarch, that even Hannibal acknowledged and feared the Fabian strategy and the Roman inexhaustible manpower. After Fabius lured him away from Apulia into the Bruttian territory and then proceeded to besiege Tarentum in 209 BC, Hannibal commented, "It seems that the Romans have found another Hannibal, for we have lost Tarentum in the same way that we took it."

== After his dictatorship ==
Shortly after Fabius had laid down his dictatorship, Gaius Terentius Varro and Lucius Aemilius Paullus were elected as consuls. They rallied the people through the assemblies, and won their support for Varro's plan to abandon Fabius' strategy, and engage Hannibal directly. Varro's rashness did not surprise Fabius, but when Fabius learned of the size of the army (eighty-eight thousand soldiers) that Varro had raised, he became quite concerned. Unlike the losses that had been suffered by Minucius, a major loss by Varro had the potential to kill so many soldiers that Rome might have had no further resources with which to continue the war. Fabius had warned the other consul for the year, Aemilius Paullus, to make sure that Varro remained unable to directly engage Hannibal. According to Plutarch, Paullus replied to Fabius that he feared the votes in Rome more than Hannibal's army.

When word reached Rome of the disastrous Roman defeat under Varro and Paullus at the Battle of Cannae in 216 BC, the Senate and the People of Rome turned to Fabius for guidance. They had believed his strategy to be flawed before, but now they thought him to be as wise as the gods. He walked the streets of Rome, assured as to eventual Roman victory, in an attempt to comfort his fellow Romans. Without his support, the senate might have remained too frightened to even meet. He placed guards at the gates of the city to stop the frightened Romans from fleeing, and regulated mourning activities. He set times and places for this mourning, and ordered that each family perform such observances within their own private walls, and that the mourning should be complete within a month; following the completion of these mourning rituals, the entire city was purified of its blood-guilt in the deaths. Although he did not again hold the office of dictator – and indeed, it was granted to others over him – he might as well have been one unofficially at this time, because whatever measures he proposed were immediately adopted with little or no further debate.

=== Honors and death ===
Cunctator became an honorific title, and his delaying tactic was followed in Italy for the rest of the war. Fabius' own military success was small, aside from the reconquest of Tarentum in 209 BC. For this victory, Plutarch tells us, he was awarded a second triumph that was even more splendid than the first. When Marcus Livius Macatus, the governor of Tarentum, claimed the merit of recovering the town, Fabius rejoined, "Certainly, had you not lost it, I would have never retaken it." After serving as dictator, he served as a consul twice more (in 215 BC and 214 BC), and for a fifth time in 209 BC. He was also chief augur (at a very young age) and pontifex, but never pontifex maximus according to Gaius Stern (citing Livy on Fabius). The holding of seats in the two highest colleges was not repeated until either Julius Caesar or possibly Sulla.

In the senate, he opposed the young and ambitious Scipio Africanus, who wanted to carry the war to Africa. Fabius continued to argue that confronting Hannibal directly was too dangerous. Scipio planned to take Roman forces to Carthage itself and force Hannibal to return to Africa to defend the city. Scipio was eventually given limited approval, despite continuous opposition from Fabius, who blocked levies and restricted Scipio's access to troops. Fabius wished to ensure that sufficient forces remained to defend Roman territory if Scipio was defeated. Another motive mentioned by Plutarch was personal jealousy of Scipio's popularity, so that Fabius continued to argue against the African expedition even after its initial successes. Fabius became gravely ill and died in 203 BC, shortly after Hannibal's army left Italy, and before the eventual Roman victory over Hannibal at the Battle of Zama won by Scipio.

Part of his eulogy is preserved on a fragment, which praised his delaying strategy in his altercations with Hannibal during the Second Punic War. The inscription reads as follows: "...[as censor] he conducted the first revision of the senate membership and held committal elections in the consulship of Marcus Junius Pera and Marcus Barbula; he besieged and recaptured Tarentum and the strong-hold of Hannibal, and [obtained enormous booty?]; he won surpassing glory by his military [exploits?]."

== Legacy ==
Later, he became a legendary figure and the model of a tough, courageous Roman, and was bestowed the honorific title, "The Shield of Rome" (similar to Marcus Claudius Marcellus being named the "Sword of Rome"). According to Ennius, unus homo nobis cunctando restituit rem – "one man, by delaying, restored the state to us." Virgil, in the Aeneid, has Aeneas' father Anchises mention Fabius Maximus while in Hades as the greatest of the many great Fabii, quoting the same line.

While Hannibal is mentioned in the company of history's greatest generals, military professionals have bestowed Fabius' name on an entire strategic doctrine known as "Fabian strategy". Renaissance condottiero Prospero Colonna was regarded as the new "Cunctator" due to his similar tactics, while George Washington was also called "the American Fabius". Mikhail Kutuzov has likewise been called "the Russian Fabius" for his strategy against Napoleon.

According to its own ancient legend, the Roman princely family of Massimo descends from Fabius Maximus.

Fabius' strategy is amongst those regarded as early examples of guerrilla warfare.

== See also ==
- Fabian Society, a British socialist society founded at the end of the 19th century and still active today. Their name derives from the tactics of Quintus Fabius Maximus.
- Gens Fabia
- List of ancient Romans

== Footnotes ==
Political offices
Preceded by Lucius Postumius Albinus; Spurius Carvilius Maximus Ruga	Roman consul with Manius Pomponius Matho; 233 BC	Succeeded by Marcus Aemilius Lepidus; Marcus Publicius Malleolus
Preceded by Lucius Postumius Albinus; Gnaeus Fulvius Centumalus	Roman consul II with Spurius Carvilius Maximus Ruga; 228 BC	Succeeded by Publius Valerius Flaccus; Marcus Atilius Regulus
Preceded by Tiberius Sempronius Gracchus; Marcus Claudius Marcellus	Roman consul III with Tiberius Sempronius Gracchus; 215 BC (suffect)	Succeeded by himself and Marcus Claudius Marcellus
Preceded by Tiberius Sempronius Gracchus and himself	Roman consul IV with Marcus Claudius Marcellus; 214 BC	Succeeded by Quintus Fabius Maximus; Tiberius Sempronius Gracchus
Preceded by Marcus Valerius Laevinus; Marcus Claudius Marcellus	Roman consul V with Quintus Fulvius Flaccus; 209 BC	Succeeded by Marcus Claudius Marcellus; Titus Quinctius Crispinus
