= Johann Glandorp =

German theologian (1501–1564)

Johann Glandorp (August 1, 1501 in Münster - February 22, 1564 in Herford) was a German humanist, educator, poet, theologian, and reformer.

== Life ==
Glandorp was born in Münster, the son of a tailor, he was educated at the Gymnasium Paulinum in his native city. At the age of 17 he went to the city of Rostock, and then returned in 1522 to Münster and became a teacher at the Gymnasium Paulinum. In 1529 he went to Wittenberg and became a student there of German reformer Philip Melanchthon, a collaborator with Martin Luther.

As the Protestant Reformation progressed, Glandorp in 1532 took a position overseeing a large Latin school, established under the Conventual Franciscans. This school did not last long. Finding himself in conflict with Anabaptist leader of Münster Bernhard Rothmann, he had to leave the city in February 1534. He endeavored to find employment in several places, but could not find a position. He asked the Landgrave Philip I take him in Hesse, and this secured him the chair of the History Department at University of Marburg, the school Philip had established, which had previously been held by German humanist writer Hermann von dem Busche.

He left Marburg in 1536. That same year he took on the management of the Latin schools in Braunschweig, and in Hamelin for a short time in 1551, in the gymnasium in Hanover from 1551 to 1555, Goslar in 1560.

== Works ==
- Monosticha in Germanorum paroemias, 1514.
- Elenchus sive epistola de suscepta gubernatione scholae Hervoriensis, 1560.
- Onomasticon historiae Romanae, Frankfurt 1589. (Digitalisat von Google Bücher; weitere Digitalisate derselben Ausgabe)

== Other reading ==
- Reiner Reineccius: Vita Ioanni Glandorpii, Anhang zu: ders.: De M. Tullii Ciceronis simul morte, simul monumento nostra memoria reperto eklogai, Helmstedt 1589.
- Arnold Overmann: Johannes Glandorp (1501–1564). Coppenrath, Münster 1938, (Münsterische Beiträge zur Geschichtsforschung 69 = Folge 3, 18, ZDB-ID 503830-3), (Auch: Münster, Univ., Diss., 1938).
- Hubertus Schwartz: Die Reformation in Soest. Rochol, Soest 1932, S. 130.
- Heinz Scheible (Hrsg.): Melanchthons Briefwechsel. Kritische und kommentierte Gesamtausgabe. Band 12: Personen. Teil: F–K. Frommann-Holzboog, Stuttgart u. a. 2003, ISBN 3-7728-2258-4.
