= Gaius Papirius Maso =

Third-century Roman consul

Gaius Papirius Maso was a Roman politician in the third century BC.

== Career ==
Papirius served as consul in 231 BC, with Marcus Pomponius Matho as his colleague. In this year, the consuls defended against a Sardinian and Corsican revolt, Matho being defeated by the Sardinians, Papirius defeating the Corsicans and their Ligurian allies. The Senate, however, denied Papirius a triumph.
