= Marcus Pomponius Matho =

Third-century BC Roman consul

Marcus Pomponius Matho was a Roman politician in the third century BC.

== Career ==
Matho himself was consul in 231 BC, together with Gaius Papirius Maso as his colleague. In that year, he went to war against a revolt in the Roman province of Sardinia, failing to stop it. In 217 BC, he served as Praetor. In 204 BC, he died serving in the capacity of Augur.

== Family ==
He was a member of gens Pomponia. His brother Manius Pomponius Matho, held the consulship in 233 BC.
