= Anares =

Ancient Gallic people of northern Italy

The Anares or Anamares (Ἄναρες, Ἀνάμαρες) were a Gallic or Celto-Ligurian tribe dwelling on the right bank of the lower Po, between the river and the Apennines, around modern Casteggio (ancient Clastidium), during the 3rd century BC. They are known only from three notices in Polybius, all connected with the Roman conquest of Cisalpine Gaul in 223–222 BC.

== Name ==
They are mentioned only by Polybius (2nd c. BC), whose manuscripts transmit the ethnonym in three different forms: Ἄνανες (Ánanes), the genitive Ἀναμάρων (Anamárōn), and the corrupt genitive Ἄνδρων (Ándrōn). The first form is conventionally emended to Ἄναρες (Ánares), whence the name in modern use; the alternative form Anamares derives from the second passage.

The form of the ethnonym thus remains uncertain and it does not lend itself to a secure etymology. No Latin form is attested: the name is unknown to Livy and to all later sources.

== Geography ==
In Polybius's description of Cisalpine Gaul, the Anares are mentioned as the first people on the right bank of the Po: the lands south of the river, along the Apennines, were held from west to east by the Anares, the Boii, the Lingones and the Senones.

In his account of the campaign of 223 BC, Polybius describes the Anares as dwelling "not far from Massalia", a problematic indication that has long been considered corrupt. An otherwise unknown Cisalpine Massalia has been postulated, a hypothesis rejected by F. W. Walbank. More recent commentators retain the transmitted text, explaining it either as a rough landmark offered to Greek readers, reflecting the limits of Polybius's geographical knowledge, or in the light of Polybius's conception that the Alps began just north of Massalia and there met the Apennines.

Modern scholars generally locate the Anares in the present-day Oltrepò Pavese, with Clastidium as their principal centre, their territory plausibly extending eastward into the plain and hills of the western Piacenza area, while the inner Apennine valleys remained in the hands of Ligurian groups such as the Friniates and Veleiates. Whether it reached east of the Trebbia, so as to include the site of the later colony of Placentia, is debated. Several scholars accept the extension, but the accounts of 218 BC speak only of unnamed Celts between the Po and the Trebbia, and Eric Franc cautions that their identification with the Anares, although common, is not the only possible reading. Christian Peyre took the river as a strategic rather than an ethnic boundary.

Clastidium controlled a corridor of passage from the Apennines towards the Po plain, on a route later followed by the Via Postumia. The strategic value of this territory largely accounts for the appearance of the Anares in the historical record. The site has yielded no archaeological material of the mid-Republican period. Late La Tène finds attest frequentation only from the late 2nd century BC.

== History ==
In 223 BC the consuls Publius Furius Philus and Gaius Flaminius, marching against the Insubres, entered Celtic territory through the lands of the Anares and brought them into friendship (philía) with Rome, before crossing the Po near the confluence of the Adda. The friendship may have been the outcome of a formal deditio (surrender).

The following year, while the consuls were besieging Acerrae, part of the Insubrian army helped by Gaesatae mercenaries crossed the Po into the territory of the Anares and laid siege to Clastidium. The consul Marcus Claudius Marcellus relieved the town and defeated the Gauls in the Battle of Clastidium, where he won the spolia opima.

The Anares are not mentioned again after 222 BC. In 218 BC the Latin colony of Placentia was founded at what may have been the eastern edge of their former territory, and a Roman garrison and grain depot at Clastidium was betrayed to Hannibal by its commander, Dasius of Brundisium. The place then served as a magazine for the Carthaginian army encamped on the Trebbia. When Hannibal subsequently raided the Celts living between the Po and the Trebbia, who were negotiating with both sides, neither Polybius nor Livy gives the name of the tribe, but they are generally identified with the Anares.

In 197 BC Livy records the surrender to the consul Quintus Minucius Rufus of Clastidium, which he calls a Ligurian town (oppidum Ligurum), and, later in the same year, its burning. The Anares themselves are absent from his account.

Like the Lingones, the Anares belong to the minor Celtic groups of Cisalpine Gaul recorded only incidentally by the ancient historians: in the three Polybian passages they perform no action of their own, and their visibility depends entirely on the strategic importance of the territory associated with their name. Strabo, applying even more restrictively than Polybius the principle of naming only the most important peoples, omits them altogether. Gino Bandelli speaks of their "progressive dispersal" after the Roman conquest, which, with the disappearance of the Boii, left the field open to Roman colonisation in Cispadane Gaul. Under the Empire, an inscription (CIL V, 7357) shows the vicus of Clastidium as belonging to the territory of Placentia.

== Ethnic identity ==
Polybius counts the Anares among the Celts: in his enumeration of the peoples of the Po valley, all the groups named are Celtic tribes (éthnē) with the sole exception of the Veneti, and the Anares figure on the same level as the Celtic Boii, Insubres or Senones. Plutarch is consistent with this picture when he describes Clastidium, in 222 BC, as a 'Galatic' (Celtic) village recently subjected to Rome.

Their Celtic character has nonetheless been doubted on linguistic grounds, and the phrase "not far from Massalia" has even been taken to imply that Polybe regarded them as Ligurians, a reading rejected by recent scholarship. Livy, for his part, calls Clastidium a Ligurian town in one passage and places it in Gaul in another, which has been explained by his use of different sources.

Modern scholarship tends to resolve the contradiction by distinguishing different levels of population: a Celtic group, the Anares of Polybius, superimposed on a substrate that remained recognisably Ligurian. Stéphane Bourdin accordingly describes the population of Clastidium as "Celto-Ligurian", and the Iron Age settlements of the Oltrepò in fact show closer connections with the Ligurian and Genoese sphere than with the Celtic La Tène world. The case illustrates a wider phenomenon, the fluidity of the boundary between "Ligurian" and "Celtic" labels in the sources for north-western Italy.
