= 222 BC =

222 BC in various calendars
Gregorian calendar	222 BC; CCXXII BC
Ab urbe condita	532
Ancient Egypt era	XXXIII dynasty, 102
Pharaoh	Ptolemy III Euergetes, 25
Ancient Greek Olympiad (summer)	139th Olympiad, year 3
Assyrian calendar	4529
Balinese saka calendar	N/A
Bengali calendar	−815 – −814
Berber calendar	729
Buddhist calendar	323
Burmese calendar	−859
Byzantine calendar	5287–5288
Chinese calendar	戊寅年 (Earth Tiger); 2476 or 2269 — to — 己卯年 (Earth Rabbit); 2477 or 2270
Coptic calendar	−505 – −504
Discordian calendar	945
Ethiopian calendar	−229 – −228
Hebrew calendar	3539–3540
- Hindu calendars
Vikram Samvat	−165 – −164
Shaka Samvat	N/A
Kali Yuga	2879–2880
Holocene calendar	9779
Iranian calendar	843 BP – 842 BP
Islamic calendar	869 BH – 868 BH
Javanese calendar	N/A
Julian calendar	N/A
Korean calendar	2112
Minguo calendar	2133 before ROC 民前2133年
Nanakshahi calendar	−1689
Seleucid era	90/91 AG
Thai solar calendar	321–322
Tibetan calendar	阳土虎年 (male Earth-Tiger) −95 or −476 or −1248 — to — 阴土兔年 (female Earth-Rabbit) −94 or −475 or −1247

Year 222 BC was a year of the pre-Julian Roman calendar. At the time it was known as the Year of the Consulship of Marcellus and Calvus (or, less frequently, year 532 Ab urbe condita). The denomination 222 BC for this year has been used since the early medieval period, when the Anno Domini calendar era became the prevalent method in Europe for naming years.

== Events ==
=== By place ===
==== Roman Republic ====
- The Roman consuls Marcus Claudius Marcellus and Gnaeus Cornelius Scipio Calvus march into Insubres territory and besiege Acerrae, an Insubre fortification on the right bank of the River Adda between Cremona and Laus Pompeia. The Insubres are unable to relieve Acerrae because the Romans control all the strategic points around it. Therefore, they hire 30,000 Gaesatae mercenaries, led by Viridomarus (or Britomartus), who march to Clastidium, an important and strategically situated town, owned by the Marici, a Ligurian tribe allied to the Romans, they start a siege hoping that this will force the Romans to lift their siege of Acerrae to come to Clastidium's aid.
- The Romans split their forces. Marcus Claudius Marcellus heads for Clastidium while his colleague Gnaeus Cornelius Scipio Calvus continues the siege of Acerrae. At the Battle of Clastidium Marcellus defeats the Gaesatae. Marcellus personally slays Viridomarus. This victory removes the Gallic threat to Rome. Marcellus is awarded the spolia opima for the third and last time in Roman history.
- After taking Acerrae Gnaeus Cornelius Scipio Calvus marches on Mediolanum (modern Milan), another stronghold of the Insubres, which also falls into Roman hands, upon which the chieftains of the Insubres lose all hope and surrendered unconditionally. Thus the Romans succeeded in conquering the largest independent Celtic tribe in Italy and firmly established their hegemony over the Po Valley, then the most productive agricultural region in the peninsula.

==== Greece ====
- Battle of Sellasia: Cleomenes III of Sparta is defeated by Antigonus III of Macedon and his allies (the Achaean League, the Boeotian League, the Acarnanians, Epirus and the Illyrians under the command of Demetrius of Pharos) near Sellasia (north of Sparta) and flees to Egypt under the protection of King Ptolemy III. Antigonus III's forces occupy Sparta, which is the first time this city has ever been occupied.
- Almost all of Greece falls under Macedonian suzerainty after Antigonus III re-establishes the Hellenic Alliance as a confederacy of leagues, with himself as president.

==== Seleucid Empire ====
- Seleucid forces under their general Achaeus succeed in winning back all the Seleucid domains in Asia Minor (lost six years earlier to Pergamum).
- Mithridates II of Pontus gives his daughter Laodice in marriage to the Seleucid king Antiochus III. Another of his daughters, also named Laodice, is married about the same time to general Achaeus.

==== China ====
- The Qin general Wang Jian conquers Wuyue, forcing the capitulation of its ruler. The conquered region becomes the province of Kuaiji. This campaign completes the subjugation of the lands formerly held by the State of Chu, and it also serves as a precursor for the Qin campaign against the Yue tribes.
- The Qin generals Wang Ben and Li Xin conquer Liaodong, thereby completing the subjugation of Yan.
- Wang Ben conquers Dai, thereby completing the subjugation of Zhao.

== Deaths ==
- Ctesibius, Greek inventor and mathematician
- Eucleidas, king of Sparta (killed in the Battle of Sellasia)
- Ptolemy III Euergetes (the Benefactor), king of Egypt
- Viridomarus, military leader of the Gaesatae (Gaul)
- Xi of Yan, king of the Yan State (Warring States Period)
