= Battle of Clastidium =

Battle during the Roman-Gallic wars (222 BC)

- Part of Roman-Gaulish wars
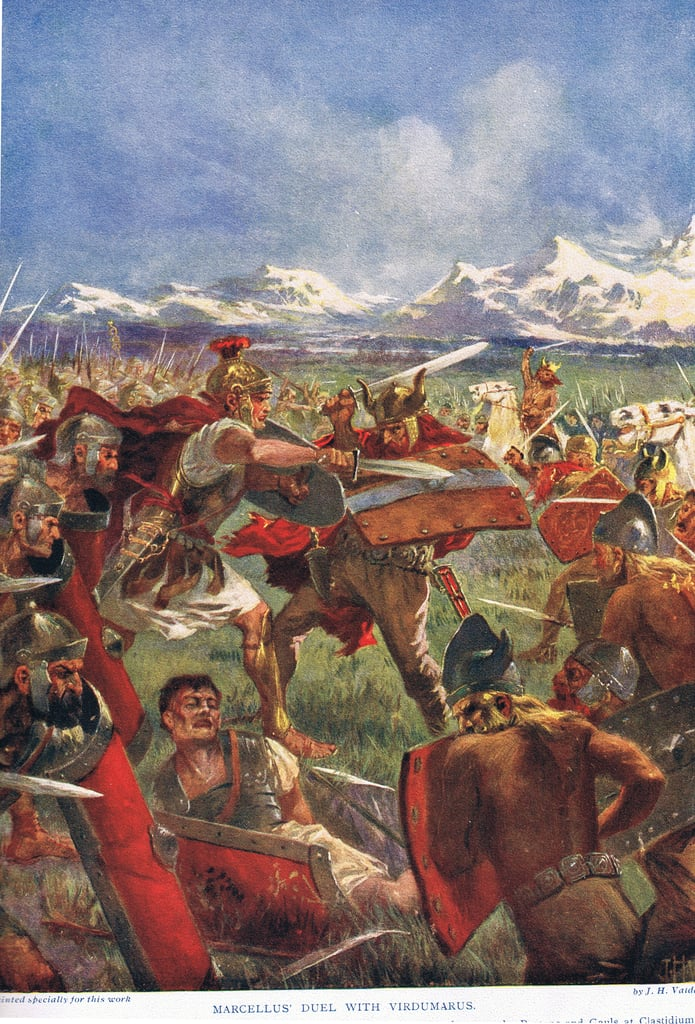
- Painting by John Harris Valda, envisaging the duel between Marcellus and Viridomarus during the battle
Date	222 BC
Location	Clastidium, in the territory of Marici tribe, Cisalpine Gaul Modern Casteggio, Italy 45°01′00″N 9°08′00″E
Result	Roman victory

Belligerents
Roman Republic	Gaesatae, Insubres

Commanders and leaders
Marcus Claudius Marcellus	Viridomarus †

Strength
3,200 equites, 600 legionaries (not engaged)	10,000 Gaesatae infantry and cavalry

Casualties and losses
Light	Very heavy
- Location within Italy

The Battle of Clastidium was fought in 222 BC between a Roman army led by the consul Marcus Claudius Marcellus and a Celtic force of the transalpine Gaesatae, called by the cisalpine Insubres. The Gaesatae were led by Viridomarus (Florus) or Britomartus (Plutarch), as the name varies in translation. The Romans won the battle, and in the process, Marcellus earned the spolia opima, one of the highest honors in ancient Rome, by killing the king in single combat. It was also notable as one of the few battles won by the Roman cavalry without any aid by the legions.

== Background ==
After the successful campaign of consuls Publius Furius Philus and Gaius Flaminius in 223 BC against the Insubres, the latter sent out ambassadors begging for peace to the Roman senate. The new consuls Marcus Claudius Marcellus and Gnaeus Cornelius Scipio Calvus however strongly urged that no peace should be granted to them. On meeting with a refusal, the Insubres decided to fight to the last and hired a force of thirty thousand Gaesatae mercenaries to aid their cause. The Roman consuls, when the war season came, invaded the territory of the Insubres with their legions, and laid siege to the city of Acerrae, nowadays in the area of Pizzighettone, between Cremona and Lodi (south of Milan).

The Insubres could not come to the assistance of the besieged, as the Romans had occupied all the advantageous positions around the city. But with the object of making the latter raise the siege, they crossed the Po with part of their forces, and entering the territory of the Anares, laid siege to a town there called Clastidium. Once the consuls learned of this Marcellus set off in haste to relieve the town. Because of the need for speed he brought with him only a small quick reaction force, consisting of two-thirds of his cavalry (about 3,200 horsemen/equites) plus a small body of six hundred of his fittest legionaries. Meanwhile Gnaeus continued to maintain the siege of Acerrae with most of the army.

== Battle ==
As soon as they were aware of the enemy's arrival, the Celts raised the siege and advanced to meet them, drawn up in order of battle. In response, Marcellus led his squadrons of cavalry forward and tried to outflank them, extending his wings into a thin line until he was not far from the enemy. Suddenly his horse was seized with panic and turned away from the Gallic line, but he converted the accident into a spectacle of dedication to the Gods. He vowed that he would consecrate to Jupiter Feretrius the most beautiful suit of armor taken from the enemy.

Meanwhile, Viridomarus had ridden before his men and issued a challenge for single combat to the Roman consul. Marcellus accepted and promptly galloped at his opponent, unhorsing him on his first pass with his lance. He then dispatched Viridomarus with two more thrusts before dismounting to strip his fallen foe of his beautiful bejeweled armor.

Encouraged by the success of their general, the Roman cavalry then launched a ferocious charge against the Gallic horse and foot. The latter at first stood firm, but being attacked from both the front and sides they were soon routed. Thousands of Gauls were killed in the following pursuit, many jumping into the Po River and drowning as a result.

== Aftermath ==
Encouraged by the victory the Romans took Acerrae shortly afterward, while the demoralized Gauls retreated to Mediolanum, the largest city of the Insubres. Gnaeus followed close on their heels, and suddenly appeared before Mediolanum. The Gauls at first did not stir, but, when he was on his way back to Acerrae, they sallied out, and made a bold attack on his rear, which were only beaten off with difficulty. Gnaeus, following them, laid waste the country and took Mediolanum itself by assault, upon which the chieftains of the Insubres lost all hope and surrendered unconditionally. Thus the Romans succeeded in conquering the largest independent Celtic tribe in Italy, and firmly established their hegemony over the Po Valley, then the most productive agricultural region in the peninsula.

== See also ==
- Roman Republican governors of Gaul
