= Clastidium =

Human settlement in Italy

Coordinates: 45.017°N 9.133°E

Clastidium (modern Casteggio), was a village of the Ligurian tribe of Anamares in Gallia Cispadana, on the Via Postumia, 5 miles east of Iria (modern Voghera) and 31 miles west of Placentia.

Here in 222 BC, Marcus Claudius Marcellus defeated the Gauls and won the spolia opima; in 218 BC, Hannibal took it and its stores of grain by treachery. It never had an independent government, and not later than 190 BC was made part of the colony of Placentia, founded in 218 BC.

In the Augustan division of Italy, however, Placentia belonged to the 8th region, Aemilia, whereas Iria certainly, and Clastidium possibly, belonged to the 9th region, Liguria (see Theodor Mommsen in Corp. Inscrip. Lat. vol. v. Berlin, 1877, p. 828).

The remains visible at Clastidium are scanty; there is a fountain (the Fontana d'Annibale), and a Roman bridge, which seems to have been constructed of tiles, not of stone, was discovered in 1857, but destroyed.
