= Abelox =

3rd-century BC noble from Hispania

Abelox (Ancient Greek Ἀβίλυξ, fl. late 3rd century BC), or Abelux or Abilyx, was a noble from Hispania (the Iberian Peninsula), originally a friend of Carthage. Abelox affected a sympathy and loyalty with the Carthiginians, although he was actually more concerned with Roman affairs. He betrayed his fellow native hostages at Saguntum, who were in the power of the Carthaginians, to the Roman generals Publius Cornelius Scipio and Gnaeus Cornelius Scipio Calvus, after deceiving Bostar, the Carthaginian commander.
