= Spolia (disambiguation) =

Spolia (spoils) is a Latin word that occurs in the following contexts:

- Spolia, building rubble re-used

== See also ==
- Spoils of victory
- Spolia opima, armour and arms a Roman general stripped from the body of an opposing commander slain in single combat
