= Acerrae (Cisalpine Gaul) =

City of the Insubres

Coordinates: 45°08′30″N 9°49′15″E

Acerrae (Ancient Greek: Ἀχέρραι) was a city of Cisalpine Gaul, in the territory of the Insubres. Polybius describes it merely as situated between the Alps and the Po; and his words are copied by Stephanus of Byzantium: but Strabo tells us that it was near Cremona: and the Tabula places it on the road from that city to Laus Pompeia (Lodi Vecchio), at a distance of 22 Roman miles from the latter place, and 13 from Cremona. These distances coincide with the position of Gherra or Gera, a village, or rather suburb of Pizzighettone, on the right bank of the river Adda. It appears to have been a place of considerable strength and importance (probably as commanding the passage of the Adda) even before the Roman conquest: and in 222 BC, held out for a considerable time against the consuls Marcellus and Scipio, but was compelled to surrender after the Battle of Clastidium.

According to Polybius, in 222BC the Romans invaded the territory of the Insubres and laid siege to Acerrae during the consulships of Consuls whom Polybius names Marcus Claudius and Gnaeus Cornelius (ie. Gnaeus Cornelius Scipio Calvus and Marcus Claudius Marcellus).
