= Temple of Jupiter Feretrius =

Lost ancient Roman temple

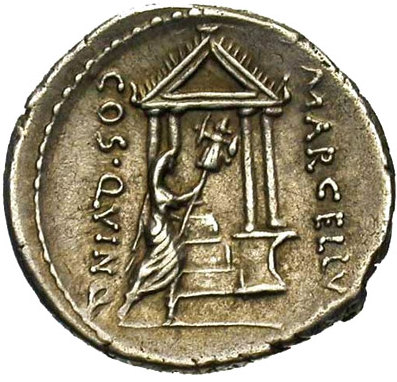
The Temple of Jupiter Feretrius on a denarius of Lentulus Marcellinus, 1st century BC - Marcus Claudius Marcellus, his head veiled by his toga, carries the spoliae opimae into the temple.

The Temple of Jupiter Feretrius (Latin: Aedes Iovis Feretrii) was, according to legend, the first temple ever built in Rome (the second being the Temple of Jupiter Optimus Maximus). Its site is uncertain but is thought to have been on the Capitoline Hill. According to Roman legend, the temple was dedicated by Romulus as a shrine for spolia opima, armor taken from an enemy commander whom a Roman had killed in single combat. Counting Romulus's own contribution, three such offerings were said to have been made in the regal and republican periods, during which the temple was also a center of activity for the Fetial priesthood. The last mentions of the temple come from the reign of Augustus, who both renovated the building and blocked a nobleman from making a new contribution of spolia.

== Origins and Roman Republican period ==
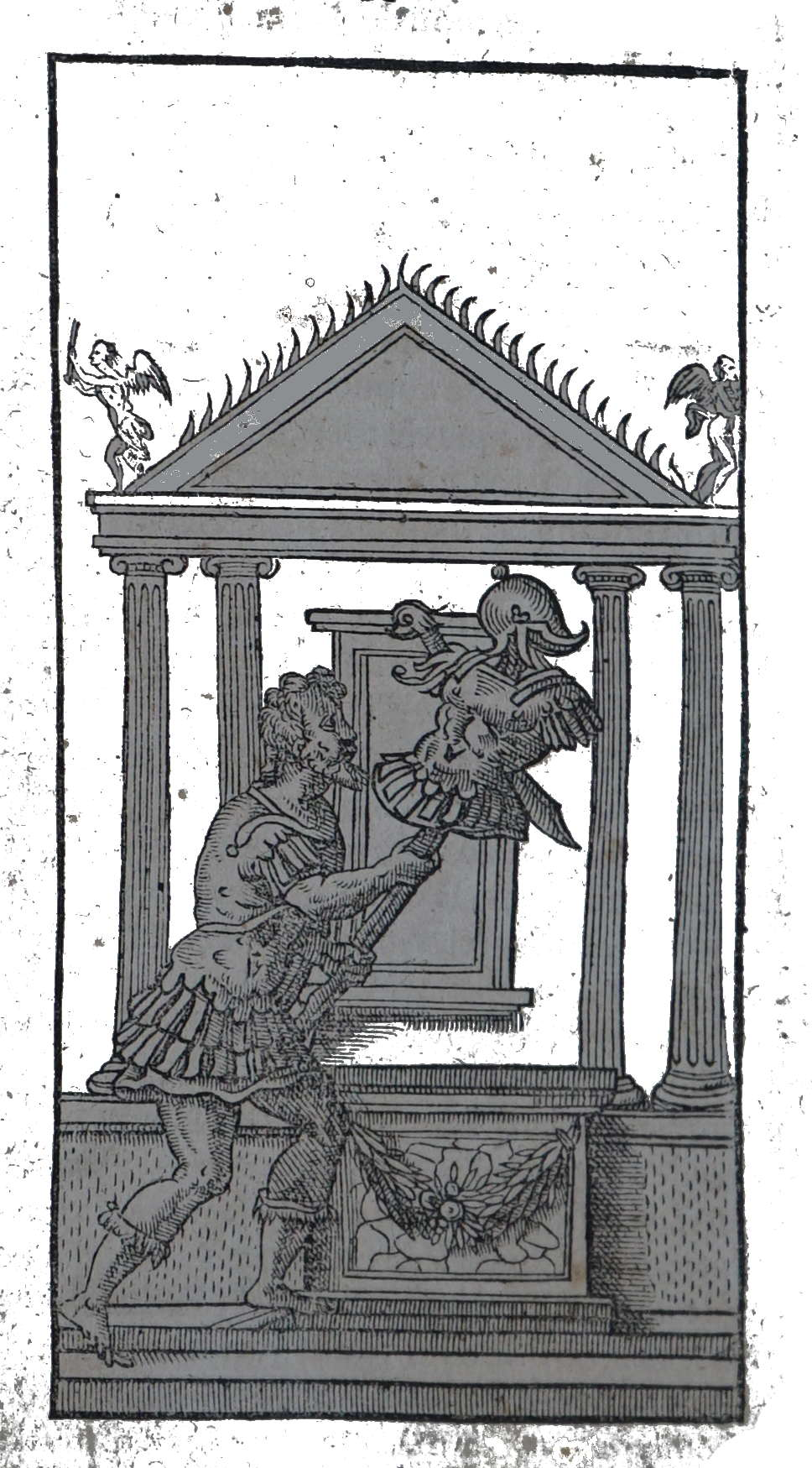
Romulus dedicates the spolia opima, in a 16th-century illustration of Livy's history

Romulus is said by Livy to have dedicated the temple to the god Jupiter after defeating Acro, king of the Caeninenses, in 752–751 BC.

[At] the same time as he made his offering he marked out the limits of a temple to Jupiter, and bestowed a title upon him. "Jupiter Feretrius," he said, "to thee I... dedicate a sacred precinct… to be a seat for the spoils of honour which men shall bear hither in time to come, following my example, when they have slain kings and commanders of the enemy." This was the origin of the first temple that was consecrated in Rome.

Livy initially describes Romulus's project as a templum, a holy space with designated boundaries. In accordance with early Roman practices the space probably contained a sacellum, an enclosure with walls but no roof, rather than an aedis, a fully-enclosed temple, although Livy believes that an aedis existed on the spot as early as the latter 7th century BC. He says that that this structure was rebuilt on a somewhat larger scale by Ancus Marcius, the fourth king of Rome. Marcius's temple was still small, fewer than 15 feet long according to Dionysius of Halicarnassus. A visual representation survives on coins minted by Lentulus Marcellinus, a nobleman whose ancestor Marcellus had made a famous offering to the temple. The reverses of these coins depict the temple as a tetrastyle building, without any pedimental sculpture. There was probably an altar on the site from the earliest stages of building, but its presence is first mentioned by Propertius.

The origin of the epithet 'Feretrius' is unclear: "the god was said to draw his name either from the fact that the spolia opima were carried (ferre) up to the Capitol by the victorious general in person, or from the fact that the general had to strike down (ferire) his opposite number before such spoils could be won". It referred to Jupiter in his capacity as enforcer of "the most solemn oaths".

As per the passage in Livy, Romulus placed the armor of the slain Acro in the temple, inaugurating the tradition of spolia opima being dedicated to Jupiter Feretrius. This term described arms taken from an enemy commander whom a Roman had killed in single combat. Similar dedications were made by Aulus Cornelius Cossus in the fifth century BC and Marcus Claudius Marcellus, the man commemorated on Marcellinus's coins, in the third century BC. Alongside these trophies the temple held a sacred piece of flint and a scepter, ancient relics used by the Fetials in the ceremonies attending the signing of treaties and the declaration of wars. There is no indication that it contained a statue of Jupiter Feretrius. The scholar Lawrence Springer regards this as deference to tradition, since the temple was dedicated in the time before the Romans represented the gods with statues. When Romulus laid out his templum, the numen of Jupiter was considered to reside in a sacred oak tree, present on the site; the scepter and stone of the Fetials may also have been regarded as containing the god's numen, although this is debated.

Personal duels involving commanders became rare in the wars of the later Republic, preventing further dedications in the temple. According to Cassius Dio, in 45 or 44 BC Julius Caesar was honored by the Roman Senate with a permit to offer spoils to Jupiter Feretrius without the customary single combat; "the assumption seems to be that such a slaying is highly unlikely under prevailing conditions of warfare, and that the rules need to be relaxed to award the honour even to the greatest general of the day". Caesar died without having used the permission.

== Imperial period ==
Cornelius Nepos says that, by the middle of the first century BC, the temple had lost its roof after many years of neglect. It was rebuilt by the emperor Augustus, acting upon the suggestion of Titus Pomponius Atticus. The project may have been linked to Augustus's revival of the Fetial priesthood, which he used to declare war on Ptolemaic Egypt. In the emperor's autobiography, Res Gestae Divi Augusti, the temple appears on the list of buildings which Augustus renovated in Rome. During the same period as the rebuilding, Augustus inspected the contents of the temple to settle a dispute. The general Crassus had killed an enemy commander and wished to dedicate the man's armor as spolia opima. Augustus, not intending that an ambitious nobleman should receive this rare honor, declared that nobody with a rank less than Roman consul was eligible to offer the spolia to Jupiter Feretrius. All prior historians had said that Aulus Cornelius Cossus was only a tribune at the time he made his offering, but Augustus claimed that the temple held an inscription referring to Cossus as "consul". Modern historians consider this claim "probably spurious". The episode suggests to the scholar L. Richardson, jr., that the temple interior was not accessible to more than a select few Romans.

According to Cassius Dio, Augustus intended the Temple of Mars Ultor to assume the traditional functions of the Temple of Jupiter Feretrius. It was in this new building (whose door bore a depiction of Romulus dedicating the spolia opima) that the emperor placed the reclaimed aquilae from the Battle of Carrhae. The Temple of Jupiter Feretrius ceases to be mentioned by Roman historians after 20 BC. If still in use by the 4th century, it would have been closed during the persecution of pagans in the late Roman Empire. No trace of it has survived into the modern era.

== See also ==
- List of Ancient Roman temples

== Bibliography ==
- Andrea Carandini, Roma il primo giorno, Roma-Bari, Laterza, 2007.
