= Nanori (Bushido) =

Nanori (Japanese: 名乗り; self-introduction, typically of samurai) refers to the act of a samurai loudly announcing his name, rank, family lineage, military achievements, and boasts from battle. On the battlefield, it was done to publicize one's bravery and military achievements. Also, it was used to boost the morale of allies, or to demoralize or provoke the enemy.

== Background ==
The practice of revealing one's name, as proof of military achievement and related to the distribution of rewards and punishments, became widespread from around the end of the Heian period. If one perceived an opponent of known name, one would reveal their name and ask for the opponent's name.

Revealing one's name was also an effective way to have the merit of being the vanguard or the first to charge recognized, as it provided witnesses to those around them.

In the Mōko Shūrai Ekotoba (Illustrated Account of the Mongol Invasion) and Lessons on Hachiman for Ignorant Children, it is depicted that allies revealed their names to each other before the vanguard charge, using each other as witnesses for the reward.

== Myth ==
In a kabuki variation of the epic The Tale of the Heike, Fujiwara no Kagekiyo of the Taira clan raises his long sword up in victory, uttering the words, "Those far away, hear my voice! Those nearby, come closer and see with your own eyes! This is Kazusa's Akushichibei Kagekiyo, known to the people of Kyoto!" This declaration has become an idiom. Also, within the same tale, Noritsuna Inomata, who was defeated by Taira no Moritoshi and about to be beheaded, cleverly prolonged his life by suggesting that they deliver a traditional nanori, since the head of an unknown opponent would not be of much merit, and thus deceived his attacker into killing him.

== Legacy ==
The practice has become a stylized form of art in Japanese creative works, or Japanese aesthetics:

- formalized introductions were introduced in Kabuki plays based on historical events, and this tradition being continued in period dramas as a stylistic element inherited from Kabuki.
- Power Ranger "roll calls" are said to be the English equivalent, as depicted in Hyakujuu Sentai Gaoranger vs. Super Sentai

== See also ==
- Single combat
- Duel
- Japanese headhunting
