= Comenses =

Ancient Celtic people of Cisalpine Gaul

The Comenses were a minor Gallic people of Cisalpine Gaul dwelling around Comum (modern Como), in the Transpadana of pre-Alpine Lombardy, during the Iron Age and the Roman period. They took their name from the town of Comum and lay within the sphere of the Insubres, the dominant people of the western Transpadana. Cato assigned Comum to the Orobii, whereas Livy treats the Comenses as a people in their own right. In 196 BC the Romans took Comum and received the surrender of 28 of the Comenses' castella (fortified strongholds), bringing the people under Roman control.

== Name ==
The people are recorded as Comenses by Livy in his narrative of the campaign of 196 BC.

The name is a Latin demonym formed from that of the town of Comum (modern Como), the central place of the people.

== Ethnic identity ==
Ancient testimony on the affiliation of Comum and its people is not consistent. Cato, quoted by Pliny, assigned Comum, together with Bergomum (modern Bergamo), to the Orobii. Livy, by contrast, mentions the Comenses as a group in their own right. The geographer Ptolemy later assigned Comum, along with Novaria (modern Novara), to the Insubres. Stéphane Bourdin reads this either as imprecision at a time when the pre-Roman ethnic identities of the area survived only as learned references, or as a reflection of the suzerainty that the Insubres exercised over the peoples around them. After a related passage of Ptolemy, Elvira Migliario places the Comenses, with the Laevi and Marici of Ticinum and the Vertamocorii of Novaria, among the Gallic and Ligurian peoples over whom the Insubres extended their influence.

The Comenses belonged to the Celtic-speaking population of Lombardy, attested in the region from the 6th century BC.

== Geography ==
The Comenses were centred on Comum, at the southern end of Lake Como (the ancient Larius), in the pre-Alpine zone of Lombardy. Their territory fell within the orbit of the Insubrian-controlled area, which reached the Po to the south, the foot of the Alps to the north, the Adda to the east and the Ticino or Agogna to the west. The Insubres themselves lay to the southwest, around Mediolanum (modern Milan). The Orobii lay to the east, around Bergomum (modern Bergamo), and the Lepontii and other Alpine peoples to the north. Ermanno A. Arslan stresses that the territory of the Comenses was distinct from that of the Insubres, even where the latter held political ascendancy over them.

== History ==
In the 3rd century BC the Comenses, like other minor peoples of the region, fell within the political ascendancy of the Insubres of Mediolanum. They enter the historical record during the Roman conquest of Cisalpine Gaul, in the campaign of 196 BC. According to Livy, the Insubres roused the Comenses to arms and pitched their camp in Comenses territory. The consul Marcus Claudius Marcellus took Comum, after which 28 of the Comenses' fortified places (castella) surrendered to him. The people thereby passed under Roman control..

In the following centuries the distinct identity of the Comenses faded as the region was Romanised. The later attribution of Comum to the Insubres by Ptolemy has been read as a sign that the pre-Roman ethnic identities of the area survived, by his day, only as antiquarian references.

== Settlement and material culture ==
The proto-urban habitat of Comum lay on the heights of Pianvalle and Prestino, occupied from the 9th century BC. It was strongly reorganised in the 5th century, with a regular plan and drainage works, before contracting or disappearing in the 4th century BC. The location of the oppidum of Comum named in the literary sources is not known.

The relationship between Comum and its 28 dependent castella has been read in opposite ways. Stéphane Bourdin, following the model of Christian Peyre, treats the castella as clearly subordinate to the central oppidum, since they surrendered at the same time as Comum, in keeping with a hierarchy in which fortified outposts depended on a central urban place. He cautions, however, that the vocabulary of the sources (oppidum, castellum, urbs) is not a technical terminology. Ermanno A. Arslan, by contrast, reads the separate submission of the 28 castella as evidence that the Comenses had no firm central authority, each stronghold negotiating its own surrender according to its own interest.

The Comenses, like the neighbouring Alpine and Transpadane groups, underwent a progressive Latenisation comparable to that of the Insubres. In Arslan's reading, this did not amount to a full assimilation to Insubrian culture, and the minor peoples retained a character of their own.
