= Epithets of Jupiter =

Aspects of the Roman god

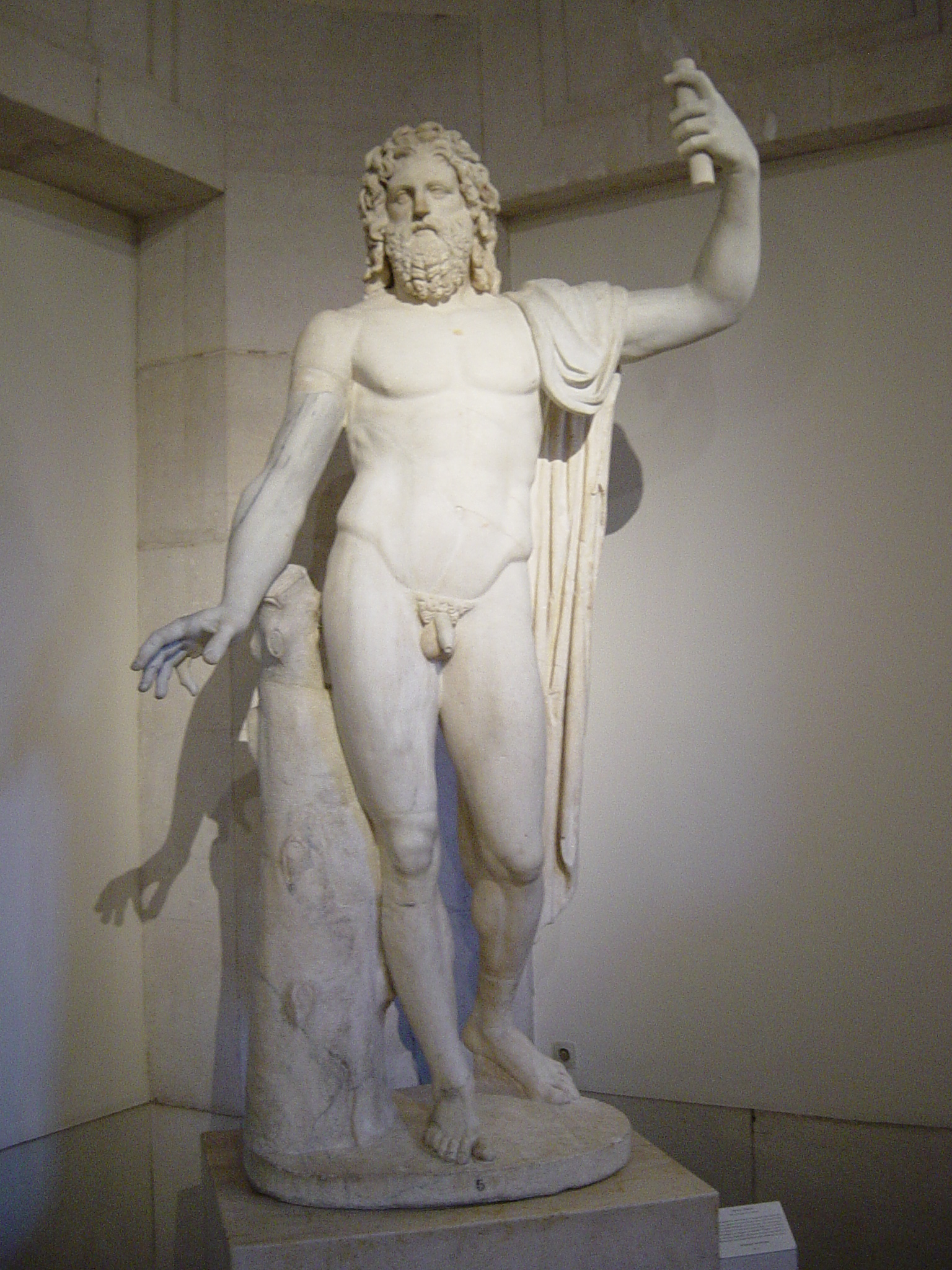
Iuppiter Tonans, possibly reflecting the cult image of the temple of Jupiter Tonans (Prado)

The numerous epithets of Jupiter indicate the importance and variety of the god's functions in ancient Roman religion.

== Capitoline cult ==
Jupiter's most ancient attested forms of cult are those of the state. The most important of his sanctuaries in Rome were located on the Capitoline Hill (Mons Capitolinus), earlier Tarpeius. The Mount had two peaks, each devoted to acts of cult related to Jupiter. The northern and higher peak was the citadel (arx). On the arx was located the observation place of the augurs (the auguraculum), to which the monthly procession of the sacra Idulia was directed. On the southern peak was the most ancient sanctuary of the god, traditionally said to have been built by Romulus: this was the Temple of Jupiter Feretrius, which was restored by Augustus. The god here had no image and was represented by the sacred flintstone (silex). The most ancient known rites, those of the spolia opima and of the fetials, connect Jupiter with Mars and Quirinus, and are dedicated to Iuppiter Feretrius or Iuppiter Lapis. From this earliest period, the concept of the sky god encompassed the ethical and political domain.

== Lightning and rain ==
Jupiter Tonans ("Thundering Jove") was the aspect (numen) of Jupiter venerated in the Temple of Jupiter Tonans, which was vowed in 26 BCE by Augustus and dedicated in 22 on the Capitoline Hill; the Emperor had narrowly escaped being struck by lightning during the campaign in Cantabria. An old temple in the Campus Martius had long been dedicated to Juppiter Fulgens. The original cult image installed in the sanctuary by its founder was by Leochares, a Greek sculptor of the 4th century BCE. The sculpture at the Prado is considered to be a late 1st-century replacement commissioned by Domitian. The Baroque-era restoration of the arms gives Jupiter a baton-like scepter in his raised hand.

Among Jupiter's most ancient epithets is Lucetius, interpreted as referring to light (lux, lucis), specifically sunlight, by ancient and some modern scholars such as Wissowa. Etymologically, the 4th-century author Servius the Grammarian connects the epithet to the word lūx, meaning "light." Aulus Gellius, a 2nd-century CE Roman writer, claims that the titles Diovis and Lucetius were applied to Jupiter because "he blesses and helps" individuals by means of "the day and the light, which are equivalent to life itself." Another author, the 5th-century historian Macrobius, states that the Salii applied the epithet Lucetius to Jupiter since he is regarded "as the source of light." Likewise, the 2nd-century grammarian Festus claims that others used to refer to Jupiter as Lucetius because he was believed to be the cause of light. According to Servius, the title was also used by the Oscan people to refer to Jupiter, although the epithet does not appear in known Oscan inscriptions. However, Oscan texts do contain the name λωϝκτιηις ("lōwktiēis"), which may serve as a parallel to the Latin term. Another Italic parallel may derive from the Latin epithet Lucetia, which was applied to the goddess Juno. More broadly, it is possible that this term is related to the title Loucetius, a Gaulish epithet applied to Mars, and—according to the classicist Krzysztof Tomasz Witczak—it may connect to the Greek goddess Leucothea and the Lithuanian deity Laukpatis. The ultimate etymological source of the title is probably the Proto-Indo-European root *lewk- ("light"), whence also perhaps Old Norse logi.

Another, similar epithet "Leucisiae" is mentioned in the works of the grammarian Quintus Terentius Scaurus, who writes "cuine ponas Leucesiae praetexere monti quot ibet etinei de is cum tonarem." Phonologically, this term is unusual, as it contradicts the otherwise well-established Proto-Italic sound shift of *-ew- to *-ow-. The linguist Michael Weiss notes that the scant attested forms in Old Latin showcasing *-ew- all demonstrate the atypical feature after a coronal consonant, perhaps indicating that either some Latin dialects preserved the sequence *-ew- after coronals or secondarily shifted *-ow- to *-ew- after such consonants. The manuscript version documented by Scaurus is likely corrupt, though the philologist Theodor Bergk has suggested a possible restoration based on another passage from Festus that reads "Pretet tremonti prietemu." Utilizing this evidence, Bergk emended the text of Scaurus to "quome tonas Leucesie, prae tet tremonti quot ibet etinei de iscum tonarem."

Despite the revision of Bergk, the philologist Martin Litchfield West still states that the text is only "half-intelligible," though he translates the sequence as "When you thunder, Leucesios, they tremble before thee, all who..." Alternatively, the historian Georges Dumézil translates the text as "When you thunder, oh God of light, they tremble before you! All gods beneath you have heard you thunder!" Based on this passage, Dumézil argues that the name Lucetius most likely referred to the flash of the thunderbolts or lightning, rather than the concept of light itself as suggested by later Roman authors. West suggests that the epithet Leucisiae may more connect to an Indo-European tradition in which the thunderbolt of a sky god is cast as something to be feared. In support of this theory, West notes a verse from the Rigveda in which it is stated that "all things tremble" before the storm deity Indra and a passage from the Iliad in which it is stated that even the sea god Oceanus "has fear of the lightning of great Zeus."

To the same atmospheric complex belongs the epithet Elicius: while the ancient erudites thought it was connected to lightning, it is in fact related to the opening of the reservoirs of rain, as is testified by the ceremony of the Nudipedalia, meant to propitiate rainfall and devoted to Jupiter. and the ritual of the lapis manalis, the stone which was brought into the city through the Porta Capena and carried around in times of drought, which was named Aquaelicium. Other early epithets connected with the atmospheric quality of Jupiter are Pluvius, Imbricius, Tempestas, Tonitrualis, tempestatium divinarum potens, Serenator, Serenus and, referring to lightning, Fulgur, Fulgur Fulmen, later (as nomen agentis) Fulgurator, Fulminator. The high antiquity of the cult is testified by the neuter form Fulgur and the use of the term for the bidental, the lightning well dug on the spot hit by a lightning bolt.

== Agriculture and war ==
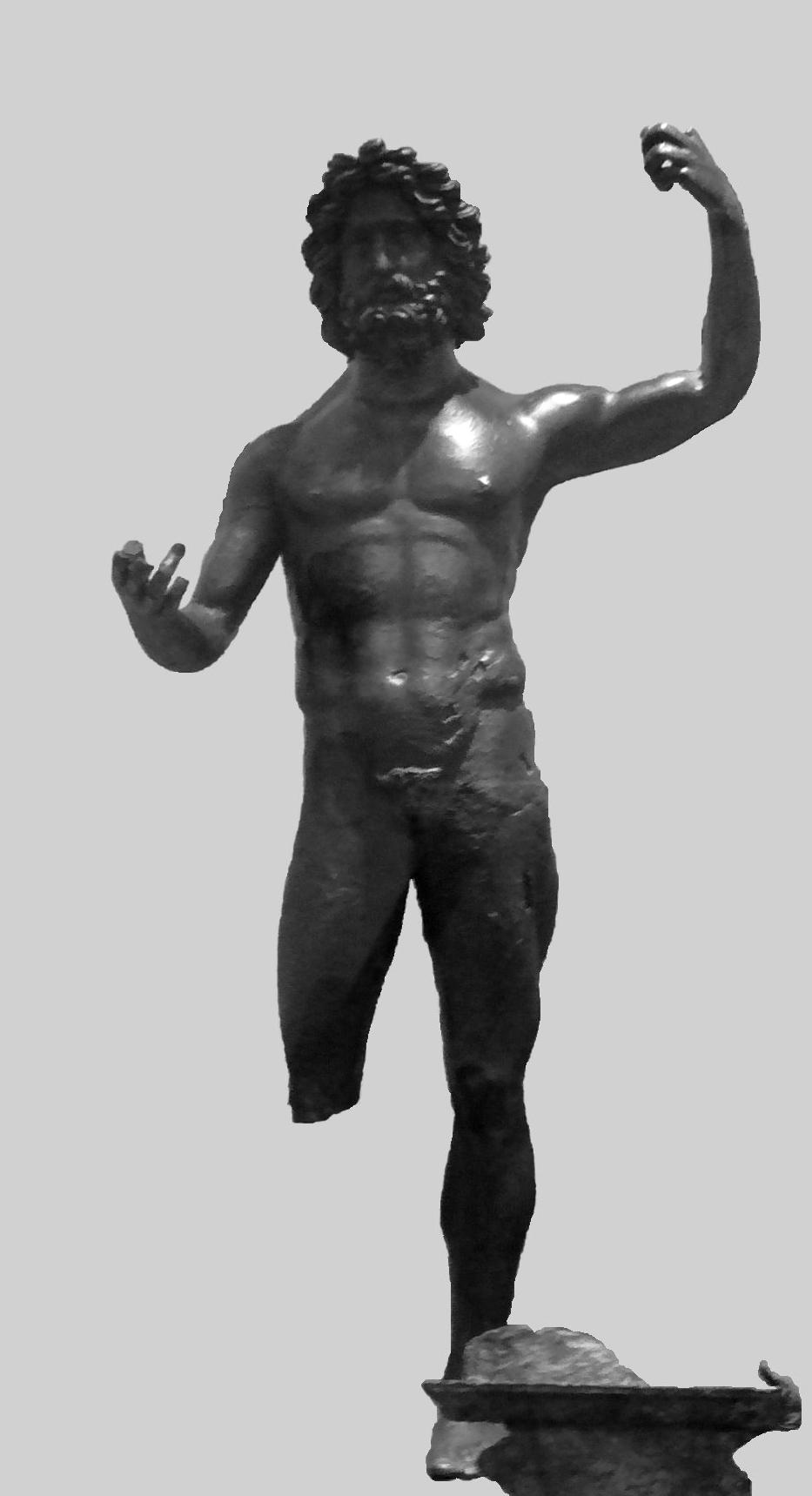
A bronze statue of Jupiter, from the territory of the Treveri

A group of epithets has been interpreted by Wissowa (and his followers) as a reflection of the agricultural or warring nature of the god, some of which are also in the list of eleven preserved by Augustine. The agricultural ones include Opitulus, Almus, Ruminus, Frugifer, Farreus, Pecunia, Dapalis, Epulo. Augustine gives an explanation of the ones he lists which should reflect Varro's: Opitulus because he brings opem (means, relief) to the needy, Almus because he nourishes everything, Ruminus because he nourishes the living beings by breastfeeding them, Pecunia because everything belongs to him.

Dumézil maintains the cult usage of these epithets is not documented and that the epithet Ruminus, as Wissowa and Latte remarked, may not have the meaning given by Augustine but it should be understood as part of a series including Rumina, Ruminalis ficus, Iuppiter Ruminus, which bears the name of Rome itself with an Etruscan vocalism preserved in inscriptions, series that would be preserved in the sacred language (cf. Rumach Etruscan for Roman). However many scholars have argued that the name of Rome, Ruma, meant in fact woman's breast. Diva Rumina, as Augustine testifies in the cited passage, was the goddess of suckling babies: she was venerated near the ficus ruminalis and was offered only libations of milk. Here moreover Augustine cites the verses devoted to Jupiter by Quintus Valerius Soranus, while hypothesising Iuno (more adept in his view as a breastfeeder), i. e. Rumina instead of Ruminus, might be nothing else than Iuppiter: Iuppiter omnipotens regum rerumque deumque Progenitor genetrixque deum....

In Dumézil's opinion Farreus should be understood as related to the rite of the confarreatio the most sacred form of marriage, the name of which is due to the spelt cake eaten by the spouses, rather than surmising an agricultural quality of the god: the epithet means the god was the guarantor of the effects of the ceremony, to which the presence of his flamen is necessary and that he can interrupt with a clap of thunder.

The epithet Dapalis is on the other hand connected to a rite described by Cato and mentioned by Festus. Before the sowing of autumn or spring the peasant offered a banquet of roast beef and a cup of wine to Jupiter; it is natural that on such occasions he would entreat the god who has power over the weather, however Cato's prayer is one of sheer offer and no request. The language suggests another attitude: Jupiter is invited to a banquet which is supposedly abundant and magnificent. The god is honoured as summus. The peasant may hope he shall receive a benefit, but he does not say it. This interpretation finds support in the analogous urban ceremony of the epulum Iovis, from which the god derives the epithet of Epulo and which was a magnificent feast accompanied by flutes.

Epithets related to warring are, in Wissowa's view, Iuppiter Feretrius, Iuppiter Stator, Iuppiter Victor and Iuppiter Invictus. Feretrius would be connected with war by the rite of the first type of spolia opima which is in fact a dedication to the god of the arms of the defeated king of the enemy that happens whenever he has been killed by the king of Rome or his equivalent authority. Here too Dumézil notes the dedication has to do with being regal and not with war, since the rite is in fact the offer of the arms of a king by a king: a proof of such an assumption is provided by the fact that the arms of an enemy king captured by an officer or a common soldier were dedicated to Mars and Quirinus respectively.

Iuppiter Stator was first attributed by tradition to Romulus, who pledged to build a temple in his honor in exchange for his almighty help at a critical moment in the final battle of the war with King Titus Tatius of the Sabines. Dumézil opines the action of Jupiter is not that of a god of war who wins through fighting: Jupiter acts by causing an inexplicable change in the morale of the fighters of the two sides. The same feature can be detected also in the certainly historical record of the battle of the third Samnite War in 294 BC, in which consul Marcus Atilius Regulus vowed a temple to Iuppiter Stator if "Jupiter will stop the rout of the Roman army and if afterwards the Samnite legions shall be victoriously massacred...It looked as if the gods themselves had taken side with Romans, so much easily did the Roman arms succeed in prevailing...". in a similar manner one can explain the epithet Victor, whose cult was founded in 295 BC on the battlefield of Sentinum by Quintus Fabius Maximus Gurges and who received another vow again in 293 by consul Lucius Papirius Cursor before a battle against the Samnite legio linteata. Here too the religious meaning of the vow is in both cases an appeal to the supreme god by the Roman chief at a time when as a chief he needs divine help from the supreme god, even though for different reasons: Fabius had remained the only political and military responsible of the Roman State after the devotio of Publius Decius Mus, Papirius had to face an enemy who had acted with impious rites and vows; that is, was religiously reprehensible.

More recently, Dario Sabbatucci has given a different interpretation of the meaning of Stator within the frame of his structuralist and dialectic vision of Roman calendar, identifying oppositions, tensions and equilibria: January is the month of Janus, at the beginning of the year, in the uncertain time of winter (the most ancient calendar had only ten months, from March to December). In this month Janus deifies kingship and defies Jupiter. Moreover, January sees also the presence of Veiovis who appears as an anti-Jupiter, of Carmenta who is the goddess of birth and like Janus has two opposed faces, Prorsa and Postvorta (also named Antevorta and Porrima), of Iuturna, who as a gushing spring evokes the process of coming into being from non-being as the god of passage and change does. In this period the preeminence of Janus needs compensating on the Ides through the action of Jupiter Stator, who plays the role of anti-Janus, that is, of moderator of the action of Janus.

== List of epithets ==
Unless otherwise noted, the alphabetical list of epithets listed below are those compiled by Carl Thulin for the 1890 Paulys Real Encyclopädie. The abbreviation O.M. stands for Optimus Maximus, one of the most common epithets for Jupiter.

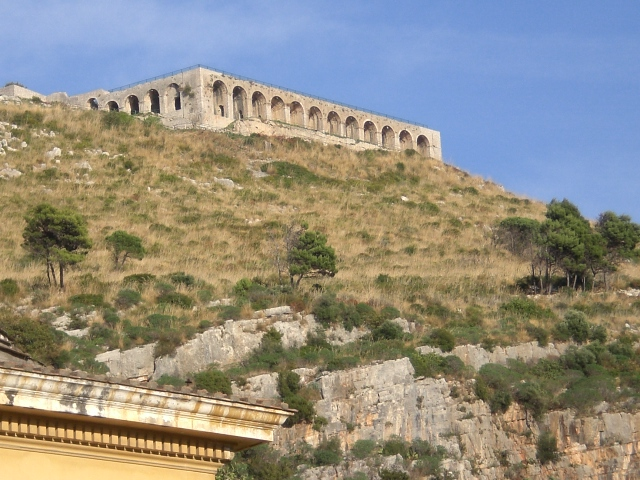
Temple of Jupiter Anxur in Terracina

- Adventus O. M. (arrival, birth)
- Aetetus O. M.
- Almus
- Amaranus
- Anxurus ("of Anxur, now Terracina")
- Appenninus ("of the Apennines")
- Arcanus (protector of the arca, arcane: at Praeneste)
- Balmarcodes O. M.
- Beellefarus
- Bronton (thundering)
- Cacunus
- Caelestis O. M. (Heavenly)
- Caelus O. M.
- Capitolinus O. M. ("of the Capitol")
- Casius ("of Mount Casius", the modern Jebel Aqra; a form of Baʿal Zephon)
- Ciminius (of Mount Ciminus, now Mount Cimino)
- Clitumnus (of river Clitumnus)
- Cohortalis O. M.
- Conservator ("preserver")
- Culminalis O. M.
- Cultor ("cultivator")
- Custos ("protector, warden")
- Damascenus O. M. ("of Damascus")
- Dapalis (from daps: dinner, banquet)
- Defensor O. M.
- Depulsor O. M.
- Depulsorius O. M.
- Dianus

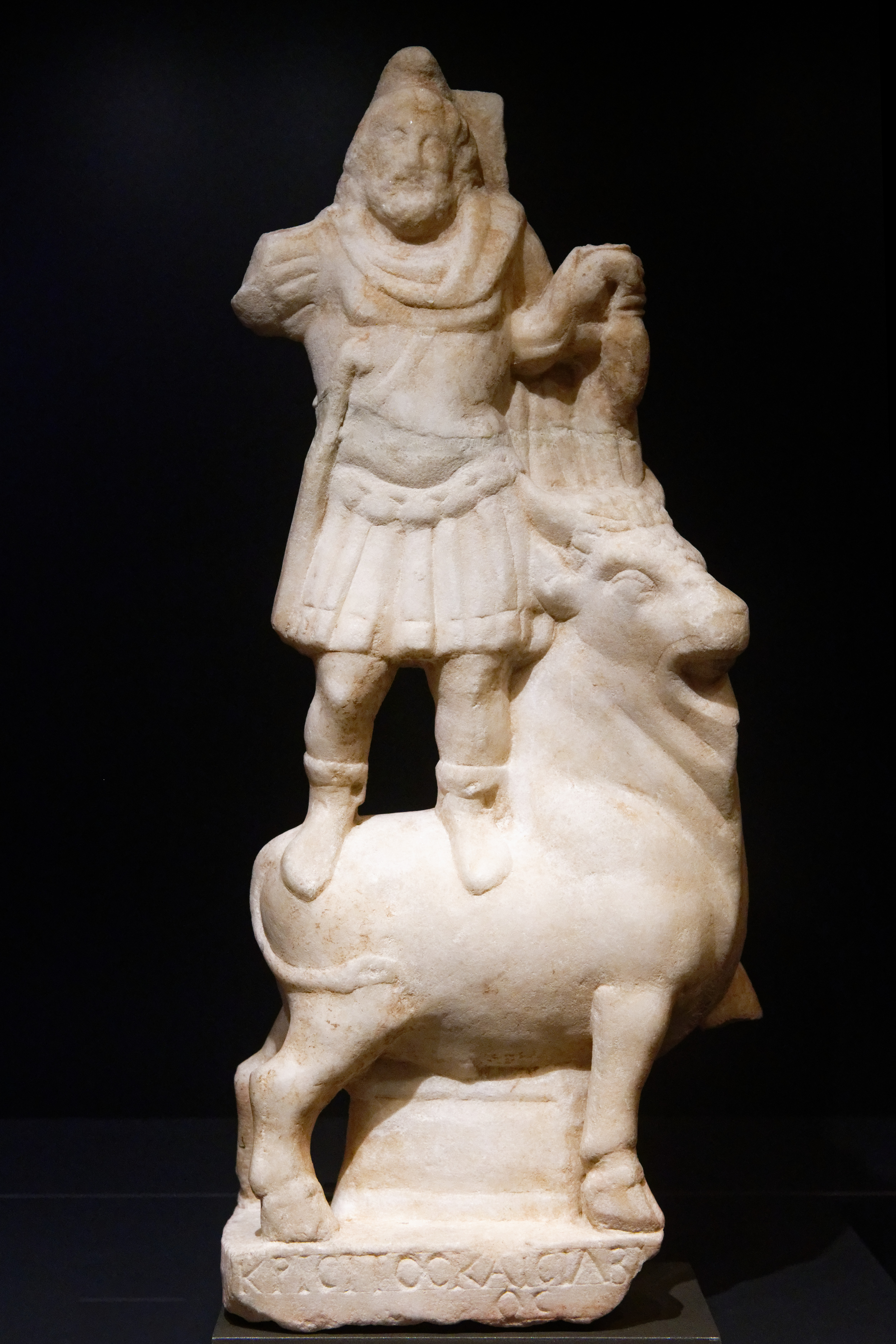
Jupiter Dolichenus, Louvre

- Dolichenus ("of Dolichus"; equivalent to the ancient Teshub of the Hittites)
- Domesticus
- Diovis
- Elicius (who sends forth, elicits)
- Epulo (who gives or takes part in banquets)
- Exsuperantissimus O. M.
- Fagutalis (of the Fagutal: the god had a temple near an old oak there)
- Farreus (from the confarreatio, according to Wissowa and Dumézil.)
- Feretrius (who is carried around or whom spoils are carried to on a frame or litter)
- Fidius (fusion with Dius Fidius)
- Flagius (worshipped at Cuma)
- Frugifer (who bears fruits)
- Fulgur
- Fulgurator
- Fulmen
- Fulminator
- Grabovius, mentioned in the Iguvine Tables. The name is comparable to the Etruscan theonym Crapśti, which itself may reflect a putative place name *Craps. It has also been connected to Ancient Greek γράβιον ("grábion," "torch"), Illyrian Γραβος ("Grabos"), and Proto-Slavic *grabrъ ("hornbeam").
- Hammon O. M. (worshipped in the oasis of Siwa)
- Heliopolitanus ("of Heliopolis Syriaca", modern Baalbek; a form of Baʿal)
- Hercius
- Hospes (hospitable or friendly). Mentioned by Ovid in Metamorphoses, Book 10, line 224. Guardian of hospitality, equivalent to Zeus Xeinios
- Imbricitor (who soaks in rainwater)
- Impulsor
- Indiges (later the divine identification of Aeneas)
- Inventor
- Invictus
- Iurarius (of oaths)
- Iutor (benefactor, beneficent)
- Iuventas
- Lapis (flintstone: the f. sends sparkles similar to lightning)
- Latiaris
- Liber (who is free, or who frees, also the semen)
- Liberator
- Libertas
- Lucetius (shining, for his lightning bolts)
- Maius (majestic, great) at Tusculum
- Maleciabrudes
- Monitor O. M. (leader, warner)
- Nundinarius (patron of the nundinae)
- Obsequens (agreeable, complacent)
- Opitulator or Opitulus (reliever)
- Optimus Maximus (O. M.)
- Paganicus
- Pantheus
- Patronus
- Pecunia
- Pistor (baker)
- Pluvialis (of the rains)
- Poeninus
- Praedator
- Praestes ("protector," "presider"), worshipped at Tibur. The title may connect to the Lares Praestites and perhaps to the Umbrian goddess Prestota.
- Praestabilis ("preeminent").
- Praestitus
- Propagator O. M.
- Propugnator
- Puer (child)
- Purgator (purifier)
- Purpurio O. M.
- Quirinus (fusion with Quirinus)
- Rector (who rules)
- Redux
- Restitutor
- Ruminus (who breastfeeds)
- Salutaris O. M.
- Savazios (fusion with Sabatius)
- Sempiternus
- Serapis (fusion with Serapis)
- Serenator (who clears the sky)
- Serenus ("clear, serene, calm; happy")
- Servator O. M. ("saviour, preserver, observer")
- Sospes ("saviour")
- Stator
- Striganus
- Succellus (fusion with Celtic god Succellus)
- Summanus
- Tempestas
- Terminus
- Territor ("who scares"), mentioned on an inscription from Tibur. According to the 1st-century BCE historian Dionysius of Halicarnassus, various plebeians had also constructed an altar depicting "Jupiter the Terrifier" in response to the terror they supposedly felt during a secessio plebis.
- Tifatinus (of Mount Tifata near Capua)
- Tigillus (beam of the universe)
- Tonans (thundering)
- Tonitrator (who generates thunder)
- Tutator (warden)
- Valens (strong, sound, effective)
- Versor (who overthrows or who pours rain)
- Vesuvius (worshipped at Capua)
- Viminus (of the Viminal Hill place in which the god had a temple)
- Vindex (protector, defensor)
- Vircilinus

== Epithets from Augustine ==
St. Augustine names eleven epithets of Jupiter in his work De civitate Dei:

- Victor: he who conquers all things.
- Invictus: he who is conquered by none.
- Opitulus: he who brings help to the needy.
- Impulsor: he who has the power of impelling.
- Stator: he who has the power of establishing, instituting, founding.
- Centumpeda: he who has the power of rendering stable, lasting.
- Supinalis: he who has the power of throwing on the back.
- Tigillus: he who holds together, supports the world.
- Almus: he who nourishes all things.
- Ruminus: he who nourishes all animals.
- Pecunia: he to whom everything belongs.

== Jupiter outside Rome ==
=== Iuppiter Latiaris ===
The cult of Iuppiter Latiaris was the most ancient known cult of the god: it was practiced since very remote times on the top of the Mons Albanus on which the god was venerated as the high protector of the Latin League, which was under the hegemony of Alba Longa.

After the destruction of Alba by king Tullus Hostilius the cult was forsaken. The god manifested his discontent through the prodigy of a rain of stones: the commission sent by the senate to inquire into it was also greeted by a rain of stones and heard a loud voice from the grove on the summit of the mount requiring the Albans to perform the religious service to the god according to the rites of their country. In consequence of this event the Romans instituted a festival of nine days (nundinae). However, a plague ensued: in the end Tullus Hostilius himself was affected and lastly killed by the god with a lightning bolt. The festival was reestablished on its primitive site by the last Roman king Tarquin the Proud under the leadership of Rome.

The feriae Latinae, or Latiar as they were known originally, were the common festival (panegyris) of the so-called Priscan Latins and of the Albans. Their restoration aimed at grounding Roman hegemony in this ancestral religious tradition of the Latins. The original cult was reinstated unchanged as is testified by some archaic features of the ritual: the exclusion of wine from the sacrifice the offers of milk and cheese and the ritual use of rocking among the games. Rocking is one of the most ancient rites mimicking ascent to heaven and is very widespread. At the Latiar the rocking took place on a tree and the winner was of course the one who had swung the highest. This rite was said to have been instituted by the Albans to commemorate the disappearance of king Latinus, in battle against Mezentius the king of Caere: the rite symbolized a search for him both on earth and in heaven. The rocking as well as the customary drinking of milk was also considered to commemorate and ritually reinstate infancy. The Romans in the last form of the rite brought the sacrificial ox from Rome and every participant was bestowed a portion of the meat, rite known as carnem petere. Other games were held in every participant borough. In Rome a race of chariots (quadrigae) was held starting from the Capitol: the winner drank a liquor made with absinthe. This competition has been compared to the Vedic rite of the vajapeya: in it seventeen chariots run a symbolic race which must be won by the king in order to allow him to drink a cup of madhu, i. e. soma. The feasting lasted for at least four days, possibly six according to Niebuhr, one day for each of the six Latin and Alban decuriae. According to different records 47 or 53 boroughs took part in the festival (the listed names too differ in Pliny NH III 69 and Dionysius of Halicarnassus AR V 61). The Latiar became an important feature of Roman political life as they were feriae conceptivae, i. e. their date varied each year: the consuls and the highest magistrates were required to attend shortly after the beginning of the administration. They could not start campaigning before its end and if any part of the games had been neglected or performed improperly the Latiar had to be wholly repeated. The inscriptions from the imperial age record the festival back to the time of the decemvirs. Wissowa remarks the inner linkage of the temple of the Mons Albanus with that of the Capitol apparent in the common association with the rite of the triumph: since 231 BC some triumphing commanders had triumphed there first with the same legal features as in Rome.

=== Iuppiter Arcanus ===
Arcanus was the epithet of one of the Jupiters worshipped at Praeneste. His theology and cult are strictly connected to that of the Fortuna Primigenia worshipped in the famous sanctuary there. He is the protector of the lots sortes stored in the arca, whence his epithet. G. Dumézil attempted a purely Indoeuropean interpretation of the theology of Fortuna and of her relationship with Juppiter and Juno, other scholars see the successive accretion of a Greek-Etruscan and then a later Greek influence on Fortuna and the theological structure underlying her relationship to Jupiter, i. .e. earlier the child and then the parent of Fortuna. Jacqueline Champeaux interprets the boy represented on the cista of the 3rd century BC from Praeneste, now at the Archaeological Museum of Villa Giulia in Rome, as Jupiter puer and arcanus: the image engraved on it represents a boy sitting in a cave, reading a lot inscribed on a tablet. This might be a mythic illustration of the working of the oracle, in which Jupiter is at one time the child (puer) who ritually draws the rods of the lots (here while deciphering one) and their keeper, arcanus.

The sortes of Praeneste were inscribed on rods of chestnut wood: they had sprung out of earth fully inscribed when a certain Numerius Suffustius cut the earth open with his spade, under the indication of some dreams.

A different interpretation of the epithet is directly connected to the word arx, which designates the political, military and religious centre of ancient Italic towns. Thus Iuppiter Arcanus is the god of the arx of Praeneste. This interpretation is supported by numerous inscriptions found on the area around the local arx, sited on the summit of Monte Ginestro (m. 752), which dominates the town. The wall in opus polygonale climbed from the town to surround the arx: epigraphs attest the cults of Iuppiter Arcanus and Mars.

=== Iuppiter Appenninus ===
The god was venerated in a sanctuary at the mountain pass between Umbria and Marche now named Scheggia Pass, about eight miles North-East of Iguvium along the Via Flaminia, on Mount Petrara. He had a famous oracle there which gave his responsa by means of sortes (lots). Its reputation was great during the Empire and it was consulted by emperor Aurelian. Dedications have been excavated on the place and in Algeria on the top of a hill near Philippeville. Claudian mentions the oracle in his description of the travel of Honorius from Fanum Fortunae.

As was the case for the sanctuary of Iuppiter Poeninus on the Great St. Bernard, the mountain pass held a religious significance as a point of communication between different geographic areas, a passage to a different and unknown world that required a religious protection for the traveller.

=== Other Italic Jupiters ===
Jupiter was worshipped also under the epithets of Imperator Maximus in Praeneste, Maius in Tusculum, Praestes in Tibur, Indiges at Lavinium and Anxurus at Anxur (now Terracina), where he was represented as a young man without beard.

In Umbro-Oscan areas he was Iuve Grabovius in the Iguvine Tables, Iuppiter Cacunus (of the top of mountains, cf. Latin cacumen and Iuppiter Culminalis), Iuppiter Liber (see section on Liber above), Diuve Regature in the Agnone tablet that Vetter interprets as Rigator, he who irrigates, and Dumézil as Rector, he who rules and Diuve Verehasus tentatively rendered by Vetter as Vergarius. In the Oscan-language Road maker's tablet from Pompeii, Jupiter is ascribed the epithet meeílíkiieís (Latinizable as Milchius).

== Bibliography ==
- Alföldi, Andreas (1965), Early Rome and the Latins, Ann Arbor: The University of Michigan Press, LCCN 63-8076
- Blažek, Václav; Běťáková, Marta Eva (31 December 2014). "Prussian *Grubrius 'god of spring and vegetation' in perspective of the Italic pantheon". Baltistica. 49 (2): 345–356. doi:10.15388/Baltistica.49.2.2213. ISSN 2345-0045.
- Champeaux, Jacqueline (1982), Fortuna: Recherches sur le culte de la Fortune à Rome et dans le monde romain dés origines à la mort de César, Collection De L'école Française De Rome (in French), vol. 1, Rome: École française de Rome, ISBN 2-7283-0041-0, ISSN 0223-5099 – via Persée
- Champeaux, Jacqueline (1990). "Sors Oraculi: Les Oracles en Italie Sous La République Et L'empire". Mélanges de l'École française de Rome (in French). 102 (1). doi:10.3406/mefr.1990.1669 – via Persée.
- Cook, Arthur Bernard (1904). "Zeus, Jupiter, and the Oak. (Conclusion.)". The Classical Review. 18 (7): 360–375. ISSN 0009-840X.
- de Vaan, Michiel (2008). Etymological Dictionary of Latin and the other Italic Languages. Brill. ISBN 9789004167971.
- Dumézil, Georges (1996) [1966]. La Religion rotnaine archaique suivi d'un appendice sur la religion des Etrusques [Archaic Roman Religion: With an Appendix on the Religion of the Etruscans]. Translated by Krapp, Philip. Foreword by Mircea Eliad. Baltimore and London: Johns Hopkins University Press. ISBN 0-8018-5480-6.
- Dumézil, Georges (1977), La religione romana arcaica, translated by Jesi, Furio, expanded translation into Italian based on the 2nd edition of La religion romaine archaïque Paris 1977, Milan
- Ferriss-Hill, Jennifer L. (2011). "Virgil's Program of Sabellic Etymologizing and the Construction of Italic Identity". Transactions of the American Philological Association. 141 (2): 265–284. doi:10.1353/apa.2011.0016. ISSN 1533-0699.
- Kortüm, Freidrich (1843), Römische Geschichte Von Der Urzeit Italiens Bis Zum Untergang Des Abendländischen Reichs (in German), Heidelberg
- Mallory, J.P.; Adams, D. Q., eds. (1997). Encyclopedia of Indo-European culture. London, Chicago: Fitzroy Dearborn Publishers. ISBN 978-188-496-498-5.
- Migliorini, Bruno, "Roma", Enciclopedia Italiana di Scienze, Lettere ed Arti, vol. 29
- Peterson, Roy Merle (1919), The Cults of Campania, Papers and Monographs of the American Academy in Rome, vol. 1, Wellesley College Library, Rome, Italy: American Academy in Rome
- Poehler, Eric; van der Graaff, Ivo (1 March 2022). "The viú Púmpaiianú and the Kaílú of Jupiter Meilichios". Etruscan and Italic Studies. 25 (1–2): 35–78. doi:10.1515/etst-2021-0020. ISSN 2566-9095.
- Poccetti, Paolo (2012). "Language relations in Sicily: Evidence for the speech of the Σικανοί, the Σικελοί and others". In Tribulato, Olga (ed.). Language and Linguistic Contact in Ancient Sicily. Cambridge Classical Studies. Cambridge: Cambridge University Press. ISBN 978-1-107-02931-6.
- Salmon, Edward Togo (2 September 1967). Samnium and the Samnites. Cambridge University Press. ISBN 978-0-521-06185-8.
- Schlegel, August Wilhelm (1847), Sämtliche Werke, Leipzig
- Schmitz, Leonhard (1878), "Feriae", in Smith, William; Anthon, Charles (eds.), Dictionary of Greek and Roman Antiquities (3rd American ed.), New York City: Harper & Brothers
- Weiss, Michael (2009). Outline of the Historical and Comparative Grammar of Latin. United States of America: Beech Stave Press. ISBN 978-0-9747927-5-0.
- West, Martin L. (2007). Indo-European Poetry and Myth (PDF). United States: Oxford University Press. ISBN 978-0-19-928075-9.
- Whatmough, J. (1922). "The Iovilae-Dedications from S. Maria di Capua" (PDF). The Classical Quarterly. 16 (3–4): 181–189. doi:10.1017/S0009838800002779. ISSN 1471-6844.
- Wissowa, Georg (1912) [1902], Religion und Kultus der Römer (in German) (2nd ed.), Munich: C.H. Beck
- Witczak, Krzysztof (1995), "Linguistic evidence for the Indo-European pantheon" (PDF), Collectanea Philologica, vol. 2, archived (PDF) from the original on 25 August 2025
- Wordsworth, John (1874), Fragments and Specimens of Early Latin, with Introductions and Notes, Oxford: Clarendon Press
- York, Michael (1 August 1993). "Toward a Proto-Indo-European vocabulary of the sacred". WORD. 44 (2): 235–254. doi:10.1080/00437956.1993.11435902. ISSN 0043-7956. Archived from the original on 6 December 2022.
- Zair, Nicholas (2016). Oscan in the Greek Alphabet. Cambridge Classical Studies. Cambridge: Cambridge University Press. ISBN 978-1-107-06892-6.
