= Caenina (town) =

Town near ancient Rome

Coordinates: 41.93099°N 12.5801°E

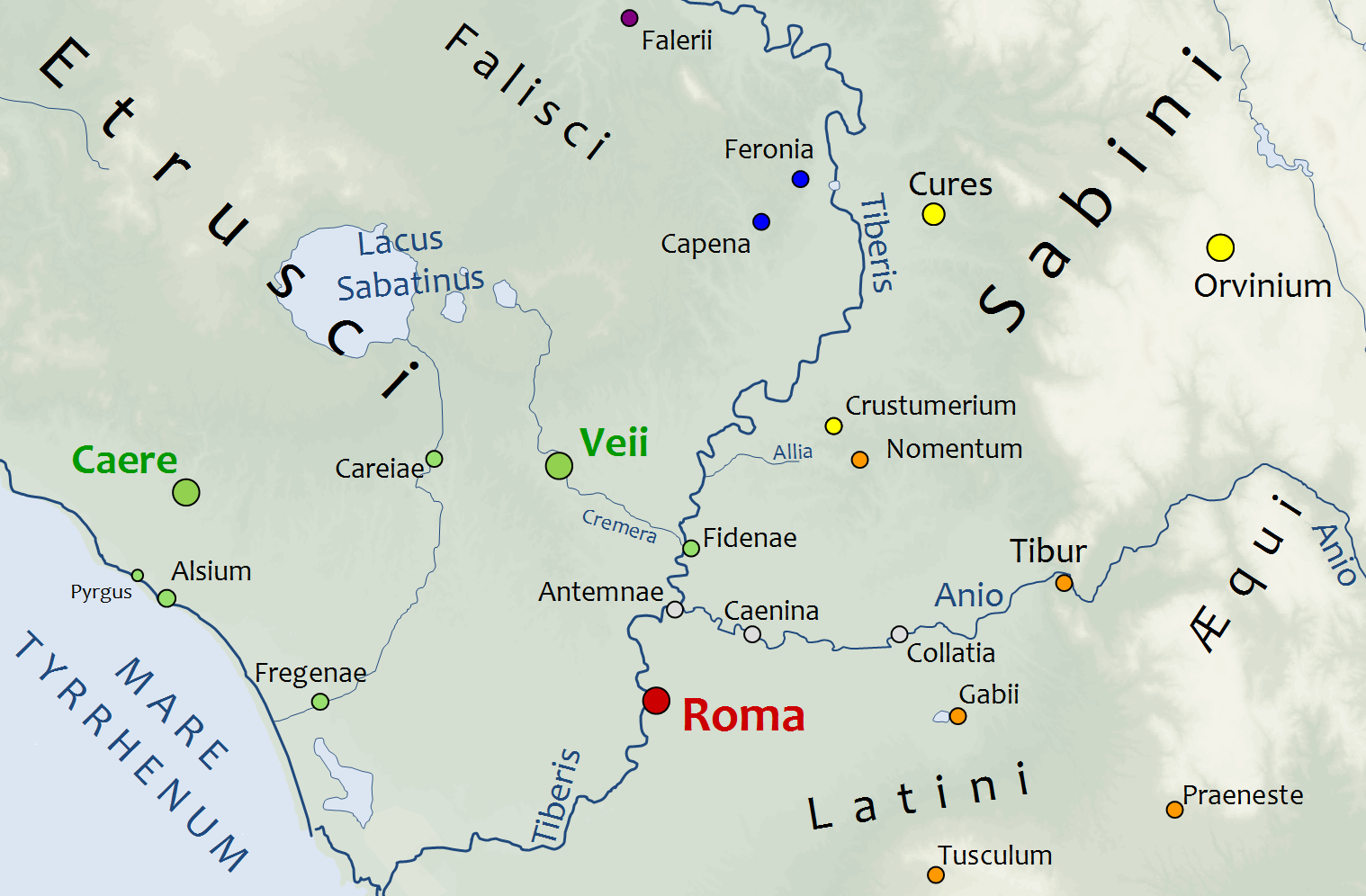

Caenina was a town near ancient Rome, in Latium.

In Rome's early semi-legendary history, the king of the Romans, Romulus, sought to obtain women as wives for his male citizens. After delegations were sent to nearby regions requesting wives and the delegations were refused, Romulus devised a festival of Neptune Equester and proclaimed the festival amongst Rome's neighbours. The citizens of Caenina (the Caeninenses) attended the festival along with many others of Rome's neighbours, including the Crustumini, and Antemnates, and many of the Sabines. At the festival, Romulus gave a signal, at which the Romans grabbed the virgins amongst the spectators for wives. This event is known as The Rape of the Sabine Women.

Outraged at the occurrence, the king of the Caeninenses entered Roman territory with his army. Romulus and the Romans met the Caeninenses in battle, killed their king, and routed their army. Romulus subsequently attacked Caenina and took it at the first assault. Returning to Rome, Romulus dedicated a temple to Jupiter Feretrius (according to Livy, the first temple in Rome) and offered the spoils of the enemy king as spolia opima. According to the Fasti Triumphales, Romulus celebrated a triumph over the Caeninenses on 1 March 752 BC.
