= Single combat =

Type of warfare

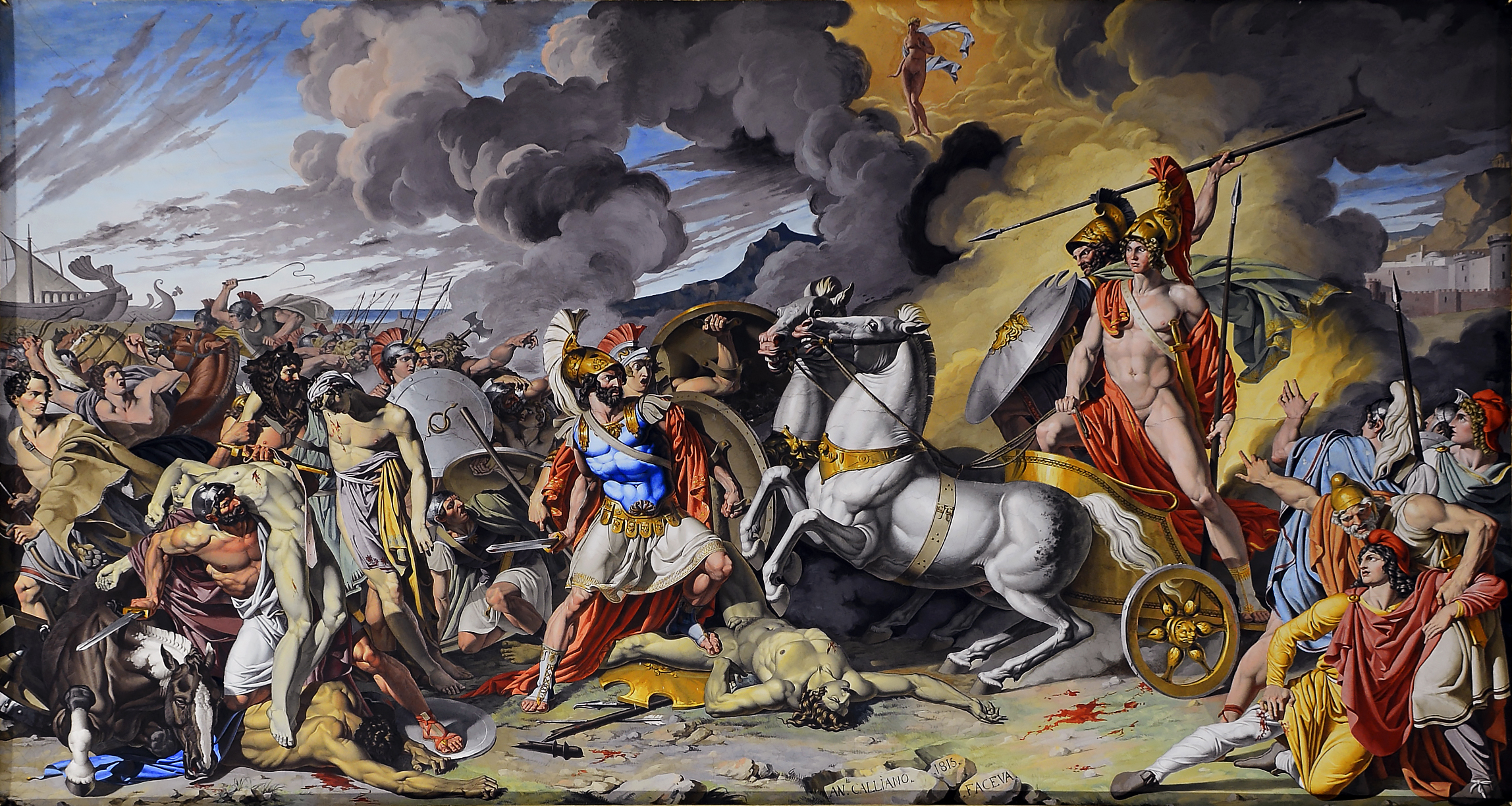
Achilles fights Hector amidst the hostilities of the Trojan War, in a painting by Antonio Raffaele Calliano

Single combat is a duel between two single combatants which takes place in the context of a battle between two armies.

Instances of single combat are known from Classical Antiquity and the Middle Ages. The champions were often combatants who represented larger, spectator groups. Such representative contests and stories thereof are known worldwide.

Typically, it takes place in the no-man's-land between the opposing armies, with other warriors watching and themselves refraining from fighting until one of the two single combatants has won. Often, it is champion warfare, with the two considered the champions of their respective sides.

Single combat could also take place within a larger battle. Neither ancient nor medieval warfare always relied on the line or phalanx formation. The Iliad notably describes the battles of the Trojan war as a series of single encounters on the field, and the medieval code of chivalry, partly inspired by this, encouraged the single combat between individual knights on the battlefield, in which the loser was not usually killed but taken captive for ransom. However, the use of the longbow and the pike square against mounted knights (as at the battles of Crécy and Laupen) ended this tradition in the 14th century, although it was continued away from the battlefield, with the pas d'armes and the early modern duel.

== Antiquity ==
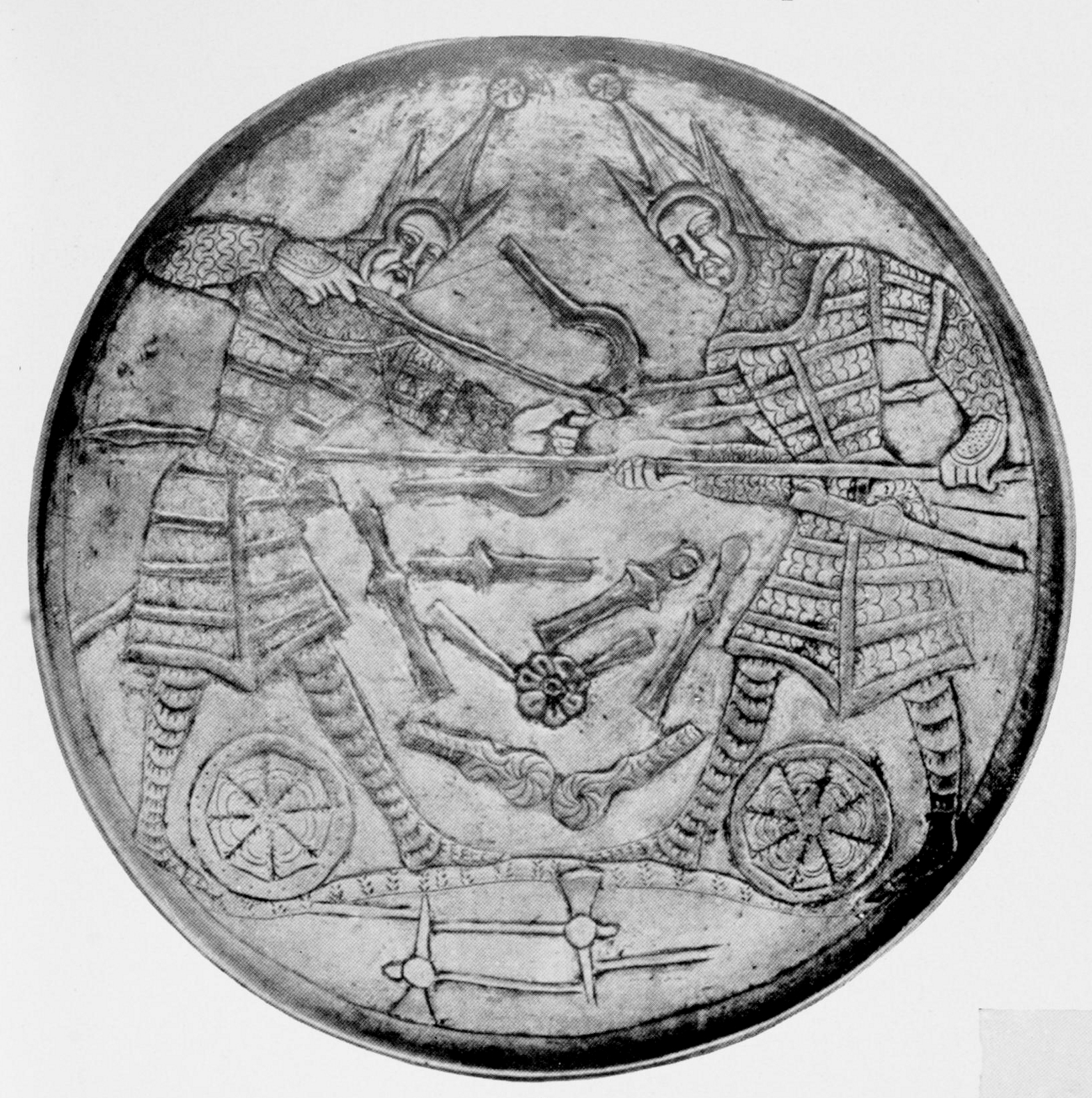
The Kulagysh plate depicting a heroic scene of a single combat that leads to the death of both fighters. Sogdian art from late Sasanian period. Hermitage Museum.

An important episode in "The Tale of Sinuhe", one of the most well-known works of Ancient Egyptian literature, concerns the protagonist – an Egyptian exile in Upper Retjenu (Canaan) – defeating a powerful opponent in single combat.

Duels between individual warriors are depicted in the Iliad, including those between Menelaus and Paris and later between Achilles and Hector. The Hebrew Bible also includes a few accounts of single combat, the most famous being David versus Goliath.

Single combat is mentioned quite frequently in the history of ancient Rome – Romulus defeated Acro, king of Caenina for the spolia opima; the Horatii's defeat of the Alba Longan Curiatii in the 7th century BC is reported by Livy to have settled a war in Rome's favor and subjected Alba Longa to Rome; Aulus Cornelius Cossus defeated Lars Tolumnius, king of the Veientes in single combat and took the spolia opima. In the 3rd century BC; Marcus Claudius Marcellus took the spolia opima from Viridomarus, king of the Gaesatae, at the Battle of Clastidium (222 BC); and Marcus Licinius Crassus from Deldo, king of the Bastarnae (29 BC).

Depictions of single combat also appear in the Hindu epics of the Mahābhārata and the Ramayana. Single combats are often preludes to battles in the Chinese epic Romance of the Three Kingdoms and are featured prominently throughout the epic.

== Middle Ages ==
According to the Byzantine historians Nikephoros and Theophanes the Confessor, during the Battle of Nineveh - climactic battle of the Byzantine–Sasanian War of 602–628 - the Persian general Rhahzadh challenged the Byzantine Emperor Heraclius to single combat with the hope of forcing the Romans to flee. Heraclius accepted the challenge and spurred his horse forward and with a single blow struck off Rhahzadh's head, taking from the dead Persian his shield of 120 gold plates and gold breastplate as trophies. With Rhahzadh's death perished the Persians' hopes of victory: seeing their brave commander and many other high-ranking officers being slain by Heraclius and his household troops, the Persian troops lost heart and were slaughtered suffering around 6,000 casualties.

In The Cattle Raid of Cooley, a famous episode of Irish mythology, all the warriors of Ulster but Cúchulainn are made sick by a curse and unable to fight the invading army of Queen Maeb, leaving Cúchulainn to fight a whole series of single combats by himself until they recover. The Welsh mythological tale, the Fourth Branch of the Mabinogi, depicts a single combat between the southern prince Pryderi and the northern magician Gwydion, to determine the victor of a war between the two kingdoms.

Many battles depicted in the medieval Chanson de Roland consist of a series of single combats, as are battles in the early Russian epic poem The Tale of Igor's Campaign (the basis of Borodin's Opera Prince Igor) and the battles depicted in various tales of the Arabian Nights.

Guy of Warwick, the legendary English Romance hero, is depicted as defeating in single combat the Viking giant Colbrand; the story is set in the time of Athelstan of England, but actually reflects the society of the late Middle Ages.

An important episode in Geoffrey of Monmouth's legendary History of the Kings of Britain is the single combat between prince Nennius of Britain and Julius Caesar.

Single combat was also a prelude to battles in pre-Islamic Arabia and early Islamic battles. For example, the Battle of Badr, one of the most important in the early history of Islam, was opened by three champions of the Islamic side (Ali, Ubaydah, and Hamzah) stepping forward, engaging and defeating three of the then-Pagan Meccans, although Ubaydah was mortally wounded. This result of the three single combats was considered to have substantially contributed to the Muslim victory in the overall battle which followed. Duels were also part of other battles at the time of Muhammad, such as the battle of Uhud, battle of the Trench and the battle of Khaybar. In the early Muslim conquest the Muslim commander would often duel with the enemy commander, for example, Khalid ibn al-Walid and Hormozd in the Battle of Chains.

Single combats were characteristic of the Samurai fighting tradition and known as Ikki-uchi. As each samurai commanded his unit of retainers, successfully challenging and defeating the opposing samurai by a single combat can force the entire unit to retreat minimizing casualties and changing the course of battle. Those seeking a suitable opponent, frequently used nanori to issue a challenge by announcing his name and bravery as well as ridiculing opponents to boost morale of his side as well as enrage the opponent to force the combat. As this is a high-risk-low-return strategy for the winning side, already defeated side, or ill-matched opponent (difference of personal standing or martial reputation) it was acceptable to decline or elude the single combat. An example of single-combat with the tragic result for the victor is told in Heike Monogatari as Kumagai Naozane defeated Taira no Atsumori at the Battle of Ichi-no-Tani. It could be banned by the overall commander as needed and notably during Mongol invasions of Japan, particularly during the second invasion in 1281, samurai fought as massed mounted archer/warrior with the annihilation of enemy as the goal. This tradition declines and disappears during the Sengoku period as each side prepared trained armies in thousands or even tens of thousands making the single combat have a limited, if any, effect on the outcome of the battle.

In Russia, single combat is known as bash na bash (an old Russian expression meaning "one-on-one"), substituting a fight between champions for a full-scale battle was a traditional way to avoid the bloodshed of an internecine war. The leaders of the opposing druzhinas or other armed groups either rode towards the centre of the battlefield or sent messengers to negotiate whether the two most skilled fighters or the leaders themselves would engage in single combat, usually to the death. The outcome of the champions' fight would then be taken as a sign of which side the higher powers favoured, and could have political consequences similar to the result of a full battle.

The oldest written account of such a fight is found in Nestor's Primary Chronicle; it describes a duel between a Kievan champion and the Pechenegs' best fighter. The most well-known fight, however, was that between Prince Mstislav the Brave of Tmutarakan and the Kasog Prince Rededia in 1022, in which Mstislav defeated Rededia and killed him with a dagger. According to the Primary Chronicle, Mstislav's victory allowed him to take tribute from the Kasogs and to have a church built; he also took Rededia's wife and two sons and had them baptised into Christianity, upon which he had his daughter married to Rededia's son according to the tradition of the times. Although Rededia had been killed, he was honoured by Mstislav, and his family joined the ranks of the Russian nobility.

The semi-legendary Tale of the Destruction of Ryazan includes an extensive account of the combat between the Russian hero Evpaty Kolovrat and the Tatar warrior Hostovrul. Kolovrat splits his opponent in half with his sword and wins the duel. However, Kolovrat is then attacked and killed from a distance by Tatar stone throwers. The Mongol ruler Batu Khan, impressed with his bravery, honours his body.

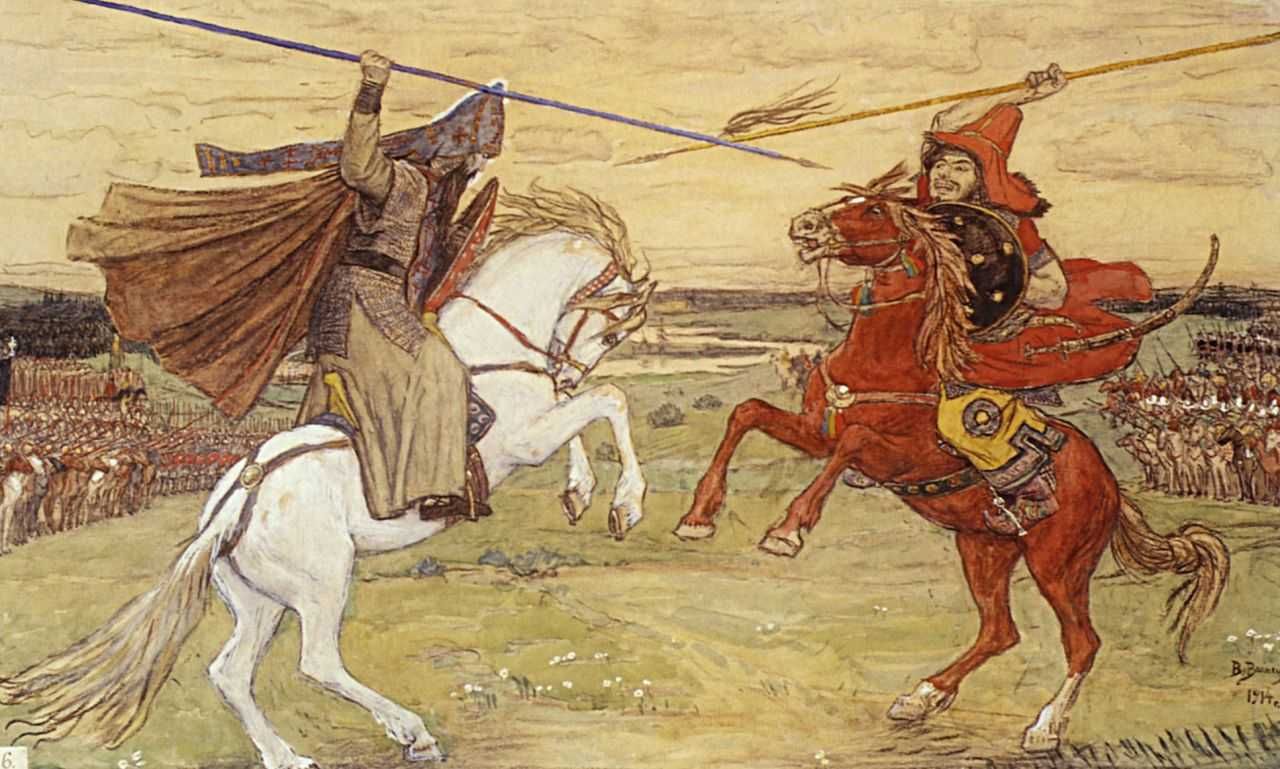
Duel of Peresvet with Chelubei, painting by Viktor Vasnetsov (1914)

Sometimes however, such single combat would merely initiate a battle rather than prevent it. The most famous example of this was the duel between Russian monk Alexander Peresvet and the Golden Horde champion Chelubey or Temir-Murza at the beginning of the Battle of Kulikovo in 1380. The champions killed each other in the first run, though according to Russian legend, Peresvet did not fall from the saddle, while Temir-Murza did.

In the 16th century Horn of Africa, during a confrontation between the armies of the Ethiopian Empire and those of the Adal Sultanate, emir Mahfuz of the Adal Sultanate sent a challenge into the Ethiopian Christian camp, offering to fight any warrior from among the Christians in single combat. This was to be done provided that the victory should be accounted to belong to the army whose champion was victorious, and that both sides should withdraw their troops without further confrontation. The challenge was accepted by the enemy. Gabriel Andreas, a soldier of tried valourterritory. was chosen as the champion of the Christians by general consensus. The two champions met and the fight began. During the ensuing combat, Gabriel struck Mahfuz between his neck and shoulders, nearly cleaving his body in two. The Emir thus fell dead on the ground. Gabriel then cut Mahfuz's head off and took it to the Christian army's ranks. As he threw the severed head at the emperor’s feet, he exclaimed "There is the Goliath of the infidels.", thereby signalling his brothers-in-arms to charge into the Adalite lines. The charging Christinas defeated their enemies and launched a massive raid into Adalite territory.

In the late-16th century, during a succession dispute in the Kingdom of Kongo, Álvaro II and his brother decided to engage in single combat to spare bloodshed, with Alvaro coming out on top.

In Kerala, India, duelling between warriors was used to settle conflicts between local rulers. The prime martial caste of Kerala, Nairs, and some prominent Ezhava families made up the Chekavars (which literally means "those who are prepared to die" in the Malayalam language). Some prominent warriors who took part in such ankam (duels) were Thacholi Othenan, Unniarcha, Aromal Chekavar, whose legends are described in the Vadukkan Pattukal (Northern Ballads). The Mamankam Festival held by the Zamorin ruler in the kingdom of modern-day Kozhikode, was a ritual which glorified the martial traditions of warrior families in the Malabar. The ritual ended after the Zamorin was overthrown. The Kerala practice was discontinued in the 19th century under the British Raj.

In Southeast Asia, formal elephant duels were sometimes contested between opposing army leaders to determine the outcome of a conflict, in lieu of full-on fighting by their armies.

== Modern examples ==
Captain John Smith of Jamestown is reputed in his earlier career as a mercenary in Eastern Europe to have defeated, killed and beheaded Turkish commanders in three single combats, for which he was knighted by the Transylvanian Prince Sigismund Báthory and given a horse and coat of arms showing three Turks' heads.

Dramatist Ben Jonson, in conversations with the poet William Drummond, recounted that when serving in the Low Countries as a volunteer with the regiments of Francis Vere, he had defeated an opponent in single combat "in view of both armies" and stripped him of his weapons.

In more recent times, single combats have become iconic – though often apocryphal – elements of aerial dogfights, with the idea, if not the practice, of single combat in the skies particularly prevalent during the First World War with the air forces' emphasis on a sort of individualism and chivalry. Manfred von Richthofen, the infamous "Red Baron", is recorded as writing "If I am alone with an opponent ... only a jammed gun or an engine problem can prevent me from shooting him down."

== See also ==
- Duel
- Swordsmanship
- Hand-to-hand combat
- History of fencing
- Mard o mard
- Trial by combat
- Champion warfare

== Bibliography ==
- Kaegi, Walter Emil (2003), Heraclius: emperor of Byzantium, Cambridge University Press, ISBN 0-521-81459-6
- Norwich, John Julius (1997), A Short History of Byzantium, Vintage, ISBN 978-0-679-77269-9
