= Viridomarus =

Gallic military leader of the Gaesatae, mercenary commander (died 222 BC)

Viridomarus (or Britomartus as translations vary; died 222 BC) was a Gallic military leader of the Gaesatae. In 222 BC he was hired by the Insubres who were fighting the Romans. Viridomarus led a mercenary army against a Roman army at the Battle of Clastidium. The Romans won the battle, and in the process, Marcus Claudius Marcellus, the Roman leader, earned the spolia opima by killing Viridomarus in single combat.
