= Publius Furius Philus =

Roman senator

Publius Furius Philus was a consul in 223 BC, a praetor in 216, and a censor in 214. He died the following year, before resigning his office.

== Family and background ==
Furius was a member of the patrician gens Furia, an ancient and noble house at Rome. Many members of his gens had previously held the highest offices of the state, most famously Marcus Furius Camillus. However, the branch or stirps of the family known as the Furii Phili had not previously held any curule magistracies. From his filiation, we know that Publius' father was named Spurius and his grandfather Marcus, but nothing is known of them. Publius had a son, likewise named Publius, who was a young man at the time of his father's death. It is not known how they were related to the later Furii Phili.

== Consulship ==
Furius was a consul with Gaius Flaminius in 223 BC, the third year of the Gallic War. Both consuls marched to Northern Italy. However, no sooner had they set out, than the aristocratic party at Rome devised a means for depriving Flaminius, who had earned their ire by passing an agrarian law as tribune of the plebs in 232, of his office.

The aristocrats declared that the consular election was not valid on account of some fault in the auspices; and a letter was forthwith sent to the camp of the consuls, with orders to return to Rome. But, as all preparations had been made for a great battle against the Insubres on the Addua, the letter was left unopened until the battle was gained. Furius obeyed the command of the Senate, and laid down his office. His colleague continued the campaign and celebrated a triumph over the Gauls before laying down his command.

== Praetorship ==
Furius was elected praetor urbanus in the third year of the Second Punic War, 216 BC; and after the fatal Battle of Cannae in this year, he and his colleague Manius Pomponius Matho summoned the senate to take measures for the defense of the city. Shortly afterwards he received the fleet from Marcus Claudius Marcellus, with which he proceeded to Africa, but having been severely wounded in an engagement off the coast he returned to Lilybaeum.

== Censorship ==
In 214 BC, Furius was a censor with Marcus Atilius Regulus, but he died at the beginning of the following year, before the solemn purification (lustrum) of the people had been performed; and Regulus accordingly, as was usual in such cases, resigned his office.

These censors visited with severity all persons who had failed in their duty to their country during the great calamities that Rome had lately experienced. They reduced to the condition of aerarians all the young nobles who had planned to leave Italy after the battle of Cannae, among whom was Lucius Caecilius Metellus, who was a quaestor in the year of their censorship. As, however, Metellus was elected tribune of the plebs for the following year notwithstanding his degradation, he attempted to bring the censors to trial before the people, immediately after entering upon his office, but was prevented by the other tribunes from prosecuting such an unprecedented course.

Furius was also one of the augurs at the time of his death.

== Footnotes ==
Political offices
Preceded by Titus Manlius Torquatus; Quintus Fulvius Flaccus	Roman consul with Gaius Flaminius; 223 BC	Succeeded by Marcus Claudius Marcellus; Gnaeus Cornelius Scipio Calvus
Preceded by Lucius Aemilius Papus; Gaius Flaminius	Roman censor with Marcus Atilius Regulus; 214 BC	Succeeded by Publius Licinius Crassus Dives; Lucius Veturius Philo
