= Gnaeus Cornelius Scipio Calvus =

Roman general and statesman

- Died: 211 BC
- Father: Lucius Cornelius Scipio

Gnaeus Cornelius Scipio Calvus (died 211 BC) was a Roman general and statesman during the third century BC. He played an important role in the war against the Insubres and the Second Punic War. By taking Mediolanum, the capital of the Insubres, he defeated the tribe and established Roman dominance over Cisalpine Gaul. During the Second Punic War he established Roman rule in the east of the Iberian Peninsula and tied up several Carthaginian armies to keep them from reinforcing Hannibal.

== Family ==
Gnaeus Cornelius Scipio Calvus was a member of the patrician family of the Cornelii Scipiones. His father was Lucius Cornelius Scipio, consul of 259 BC, the son of the patrician censor of 280 BC, Lucius Cornelius Scipio Barbatus. His younger brother was Publius Cornelius Scipio, consul of 218 and father of the famous Scipio Africanus (the most famous of the Scipio family). Gnaeus Cornelius Scipio was nicknamed Calvus (the bald) to distinguish him from his uncle, another Gnaeus Cornelius Scipio, who was nicknamed Asina (donkey) and who had been consul twice during the First Punic War.

== Consulship ==
Gnaeus Cornelius was elected consul for 222 BC with Marcus Claudius Marcellus as his co-consul. Both consuls led their armies against the Insubres of Cisalpine Gaul. Scipio laid siege to Acerrae, while Marcellus engaged the Insubres at Clastidium. After Acerrae fell, Scipio marched towards Mediolanum, drawing the Gauls out and routing them. He took that city and thereby forced the Gauls to submit to the Romans.

== The Second Punic War ==
Gnaeus Cornelius Scipio Calvus fought in the Second Punic War. Though he never faced Hannibal himself, he played a major part in defeating him. At the start of the War Gnaeus served as a legate in the army of his younger brother Publius, who was consul at the outbreak of conflict in 218 BC. From then until his death in 211 BC he fought against the Carthaginians in Spain.

=== Marching against Hannibal ===
In 218 BC, Gnaeus and his brother sailed with Publius' consular army to the allied Greek city of Massilia in southern Gaul. From there they planned to start operations against Hannibal and the Carthaginian holdings on the Iberian peninsula. Publius was informed Hannibal was to the north in Gaul, so he sent a cavalry force north up the eastern bank of the Rhone River, which clashed with a similar force of Numidian light cavalry. After a hard-fought skirmish, they managed to drive off the Numidians. Publius then marched his entire force north intending to do battle with Hannibal in Gaul. Meanwhile, Hannibal had marched east towards the Alps. Arriving at the deserted Carthaginian camp, Scipio learned that Hannibal was three days' march away and decided to send his army to the Iberian peninsula under the command of his elder brother Gnaeus, while he himself returned to Northern Italy to organize the defences.

Gnaeus invades the Iberian peninsula, 218 BC

=== Invading the Iberian Peninsula ===
Gnaeus, with 20,000 infantry (2 Roman legions and 2 allied alae), 2,200 cavalry and 60 quinqueremes, sailed from Massilia and landed in eastern Spain at Emporion. The Greek cities of Emporion and Tarraco welcomed the Romans, and Gnaeus began to win over the Iberian tribes north of the Ebro. Hannibal had left a certain Hanno with 10,000 infantry and 1,000 cavalry to garrison the newly conquered territory north of the Ebro, he was seriously outnumbered so Hasdrubal Barca, who had been left in command of the Carthaginian army in southern Spain, decided to reinforce him and marched north with 8,000 infantry and 1,000 cavalry.

=== Battle of Cissa ===
Roman campaign north of the Ebro river, 218 BC

Hanno, afraid he would lose the Iberians and all of the Cartiginian territory north of the Ebro if he waited any longer, marched and attacked the Romans just north of Tarraco, near a place called Cissa or Kissa. He fought a pitched battle, in which there were no brilliant maneuvers or ambushes; the armies just formed up and faced off. Being outnumbered two to one, Hanno was defeated relatively easily, losing 6,000 soldiers in battle. Furthermore, the Romans managed to capture the Carthaginian camp, along with 2,000 soldiers and Hanno himself. The camp contained all the baggage left by Hannibal. The prisoners also included Indibilis, an influential Iberian chieftain. The Romans also stormed the town of Cissa, though to the frustration of the Romans it did not contain any valuable booty.

=== Battle of the Ebro River ===
In spring 217 BC Gnaeus commanded a fleet of 55 warships (probably quinqueremes) during a naval battle near the mouth of the Ebro River. The Carthaginian naval contingent of 40 warships facing him was totally defeated after a surprise attack by the Roman ships. The Carthaginians lost 29 ships and the control of seas around the Iberian peninsula. Furthermore, the victory enhanced Roman prestige among the warlike Iberians.

=== Battle of Dertosa ===
In early 215 BC the Romans, under the joined command of the brothers Gnaeus and Publius Scipio, crossed the Ebro River. Hasdrubal marched north with his field army, and after some maneuvering the two armies faced of on the south bank of the Ebro across from the town of Dertosa. The armies were about similar in size with the Scipio brothers having 30,000 infantry and 2,800 cavalry against Hasdrubal's 25,000 infantry, 4,000 cavalry and 20 elephants. Hasdrubal tried to emulate his brother Hannibal's envelopment tactic (see: Cannae) but failed because the Roman cavalry held out and he could not close the trap. The Scipio brothers continued with their policy of subjugating the Iberian tribes and raiding Carthaginian possessions. After losing most of his field army, Hasdrubal had to be reinforced with the army that was to sail to Italy and reinforce Hannibal. Thus, by winning this battle, the Scipios had indirectly prevented the situation in Italy from getting worse in addition to improving their own situation in Iberia.

=== Battles of the Upper Baetis ===
In 212 BC, the Scipio brothers captured Castulo, a major mining town and the home of Hannibal's wife Imilce. They then wintered at Castulo and Ilugia.

Over the last couple of years the strength of the Scipio brothers' army had been reduced by losses and the need to garrison their recently conquered territories Therefore, the brothers had hired around 20,000 Celt-Iberian mercenaries to supplement their field army to 40,000 men. With a large army at their back and observing that the Carthaginian commanders had deployed separately from each other the Scipio brothers decided to divide their forces. Publius led an army of Roman and allied soldiers to attack Mago Barca near Castulo, while Gnaeus took one-third of the Romans and all of the mercenaries to attack Hasdrubal Barca. This stratagem would lead to two battles which took place within a few days of each other; the Battle of Castulo and the Battle of Ilorca.

==== Battle of Castulo ====
As Publius neared Castulo, he was harassed day and night by Numidian light cavalry under Masinissa. When informed that Indibilis was moving across his line of retreat with 7,500 Iberians, Publius decided not to face Mago but to attack the Iberian chieftain. Leaving 2,000 soldiers in his camp under the legate Tiberius Fonteus, he marched out at night, to evade Masinissa's cavalry, and launched an attack on the Iberians in the early morning. He caught Indibilis and his men by surprise and, with a numerical superiority, began to gain the upper hand in the ensuing action. The Iberians managed to hold off the Romans just long enough for Masinissa to arrive.

With the Numidian horse attacking their flank, the Roman assault on the Iberians began to slacken. Then Mago and Hasdrubal Gisco arrived with their combined armies. The Romans, after a grim struggle, broke and fled, leaving Publius and most of their comrades dead on the field. Mago gave the Numidians enough time to loot the dead before force marching the army towards Hasdrubal Barca's position. A handful of Roman survivors managed to reach Fonteus's camp.

==== Battle of Ilorca ====
Gnaeus Scipio had arrived at his objective first. Hasdrubal Barca decided to refuse battle and stayed within his fortified camp, he then managed to bribe the Celt-Iberian mercenaries to desert Gnaeus. This led to Hasdrubal's army outnumbering that of Gnaeus. Still Hasdrubal bided his time, avoiding any battles with the Romans.

Gnaeus, having lost his numerical advantage, decided to withdraw north after Mago and Hasdrubal Gisco arrived with their armies. The Romans moved out of their camp, leaving their camp fires burning, and made for the Ebro at night. The Numidians located them the following day; their attacks forced the Romans to take position for the night on a hilltop near Ilorca. The combined Carthaginian armies arrived during the night. As the ground was too stony for digging the Romans tried to create a defensive wall with baggage and saddles. The Carthaginians easily overran these makeshift fortification, destroying Gnaeus's army.

== Death ==
Gnaeus died in battle, fighting the Carthaginians who had overrun his makeshift camp during the battle of Ilorca. His death did not end the Scipios’ war against the Carthaginians. His nephew Publius would play an even greater part in bringing down Hannibal and in establishing Roman rule over the Iberian peninsula.

== Descendants ==
His sons were Publius Cornelius Scipio Nasica and Gnaeus Cornelius Scipio Hispallus.

Publius (nicknamed Nasica for his pointed nose), was consul in 191 BC. He was the first Scipio Nasica and founded the Nasica branch of the Scipiades. Scipio Nasica's son, another Scipio Nasica, nicknamed Corculum, married his second cousin Cornelia Africana Major, the eldest daughter of Scipio Africanus, and thus united the two lines. Their descendants in the male line continued until at least 46 BC, in the person of Metellus Scipio (who was adopted into the Caecilii Metelli family).

Hispallus was named Pontiff in 199 BC and elected Praetor in 179 BC. In 176 BC, he was elected consul together with Quintus Petillius Spurinus.

== See also ==
- Scipio-Paullus-Gracchus family tree

Political offices
Preceded by G. Flaminius; P. Furius Philus	Roman consul 222 BC; With: M. Claudius Marcellus	Succeeded by P. Cornelius Scipio Asina; M. Minucius Rufus
