= Insubres =

Ancient Celtic people of Cisalpine Gaul

The Insubres or Insubri were an ancient Celtic people of Cisalpine Gaul, settled in what is now Lombardy in northern Italy, whose chief town was Mediolanum (modern Milan). Polybius names them as the most powerful of the Gauls of the region. Unlike the peoples that ancient writers derived from the trans-Alpine invasion of the 4th century BC, the Insubres are generally taken for the direct continuation of the older, Celtic-speaking population of the Golasecca culture. Their resistance to Rome ended with the fall of Mediolanum in 222 BC and their final submission in the 190s BC, after which they kept a federated status until they were absorbed into Roman Italy.

== Name ==
=== Attestations ===
The people are named in Greek as Ínsombres (Ἴνσομβρες, with the variants Ἰνσόμβρες and Ἴσομβρες) by Polybius in the 2nd century BC, and as Ínsoubroi (Ἴνσουβροι) by Strabo in the early 1st century AD and by Plutarch. The Latin forms Insubri and Insubres appear in Cato's Origines, in Cicero, Livy and Pliny, and later in Tacitus, Florus and Orosius.

In Livy's account of the Gallic migration into Italy, the name of the country the migrants reached, the ager Insubrius, coincided with that of one of their own peoples, a pagus of the Aedui also called Insubres, and the migrants took the coincidence as a favorable omen.

=== Etymology ===
The name is generally regarded as Celtic, but its analysis is unsettled. Livy suggested that their Celtic name Isombres could possibly mean "Lower Umbrians," or inhabitants of the country below Umbria. Karl Horst Schmidt read the initial in- as a regional variant of the Celtic preposition eni-, while allowing that the second element -subres may not be Celtic, and reconstructed a possible *in-su-bro or eni-su-bro. Graham Isaac listed the name, with a query, among formations built on the stem bero- or br(o)- ('bearer', 'judger') preceded by a preposition, and Patrizia de Bernardo Stempel compared it with the Iberian names Antabri and Cantabri, judging it still obscure. A separate suggestion by Pierre-Yves Lambert connects the first element insu- with the Old Irish és, eis ('tracks').

== Geography ==
The Insubres held the western part of the Transpadane plain, in central Lombardy. According to the textual tradition their land lay between the Ticino and the Oglio, the area that had formed the core of the Golasecca culture. Polybius lists them along the Po after the Laevi and Libici and before the Cenomani, and calls them the most powerful of the Cisalpine Gauls. Their frontier with the Cenomani probably ran along the Oglio in the 3rd century BC. After the Roman conquest it was brought back westward to the Adda, to the advantage of the colony of Cremona.

The peoples of Cisalpine Gaul, 391-192 BC.

On the testimony of Ptolemy, several neighboring Gallic and Ligurian communities, the Comenses of Comum, the Laevi and Marici of Ticinum, and the Vertamocori of Novaria, came under Insubrian influence, so that the area the Insubres controlled reached the Po river in the south, the Alpine foothills in the north, the Adda river in the east, and the Ticino river in the west. The extent of any such hegemony is debated. Ralph Haeussler notes that the territory usually assigned to the Insubres is archaeologically very diverse, the Lomellina, the Ticino valley and the area around Comum each yielding distinct assemblages from the region around Mediolanum, which sits awkwardly with the idea of an "Insubrian empire" controlling its neighbors.

Ermanno A. Arslan questions whether the populations of the lower Lake Maggiore and the Varese region were Insubrian at all, treating the area as a frontier rather than Insubrian land proper. He observes that the lake routes and the valleys up to the Alpine passes were held by the Lepontii, and that Roman epigraphy later records the district as a patchwork of vici, the trace of small local communities rather than a single people. On his reading much of what is called Insubrian here may instead be autonomous groups, or populations acculturated under Insubrian dominance, much as the Comenses kept a separate identity while falling under Insubrian influence. He adds that weapons continue to appear in local graves through the 2nd century BC, after Rome had disarmed the Insubres as former allies of Hannibal, which he takes as evidence that these groups stood apart from the Insubres proper.

== History ==
=== Origins and ethnogenesis ===
Polybius reports only that the Insubres seized the western Po plain from the Etruscans and were the most powerful of the Gauls who settled there. Livy gives a fuller legend. A surplus population of Gauls led by Bellovesus crossed the Alps by the passes of the Taurini, defeated the Etruscans near the Ticino, and founded Mediolanum in the ager Insubrius.

Most recent scholarship separates the Insubres from this invasion narrative. Venceslas Kruta holds that they were the only major native Celtic people of Cisalpine Gaul, the direct continuation of the anonymous but Celtic-speaking population of the Golasecca culture, which did not disappear in the 4th century BC but was slowly transformed. No archaeological trace of intrusive groups, of the kind found east of the Oglio and south of the Po, has been identified in their territory. The invasion nonetheless had local effects: an internal restructuring, a contraction of settlement, and the economic decline of Comum, perhaps to the benefit of Mediolanum, whose role as the central place of the Insubres is first attested by Polybius in connection with the war of 222 BC. The earliest La Tène material known from Insubrian territory post-dates the early 3rd century BC and sits within a context still strongly marked by Golasecca tradition, which Kruta takes as evidence of continuity.

The same continuity underlies the reconstruction of Ermanno A. Arslan, who treats the La Tène migration into Italy as selective. The incoming Celts took over depopulated districts and lands held by non-Celtic peoples, but settled beside the Golasecca-period populations already in place, whom he, with most current scholarship, counts as Celtic-speaking. The Insubres, an old Golaseccan stock, were therefore acculturated rather than displaced, which for Arslan explains why La Tène material spread only slowly through their territory and that of their neighbours.

The equation of the Insubres with the Golasecca culture has been questioned on method. J. H. C. Williams argues that it rests on aggregating Celtic linguistic evidence, trans-Alpine Hallstatt artifact styles and literary narratives about Gauls, and that it conflates externally imposed categories such as "Celtic" with the real human communities they do not necessarily match.

=== Wars with Rome ===
After Rome distributed the former territory of the Senones in 232 BC, a Gallic coalition formed around the Boii and their northern neighbors the Insubres. To strengthen their forces they hired Gaesatae, mercenaries from the Rhône valley. At the Battle of Telamon in 225 BC the Cenomani and Veneti sided with Rome, which obliged the Insubres and Boii to leave part of their men to defend their own land. The coalition army, some 50,000 foot and 20,000 horse and chariots, was caught between two Roman forces and destroyed.

In 223 BC the Romans attacked the Insubres directly, crossing the Po from the territory of the Anares. A first setback drove them back onto the land of their Cenomani allies, from which they resumed the campaign. The Insubres concentrated their forces, withdrew from the temple of a war goddess the golden standards reserved for war, and gave battle on a river, probably the Oglio, then their frontier with the Cenomani. They were defeated. The following year their request for peace was refused by the consuls Marcus Claudius Marcellus and Gnaeus Cornelius Scipio, and they hired a further 30,000 Gaesatae. The Romans opened the campaign of 222 BC with the siege of Acerrae, a stronghold near the confluence of the Adda and the Po. To draw them off, the Insubres and their allies crossed the Po and besieged Clastidium (Casteggio) in Anares territory. In the ensuing battle Marcellus relieved the place, killing the Gaesatic commander Britomartus in single combat and winning the spolia opima. (Note: The name of the slain commander is also transmitted as Viridomarus.) Acerrae and then Mediolanum fell, which forced the Insubres to surrender.

=== Second Punic War and conquest ===
Polybius treated the surrender of 222 BC as the end of the Gallic wars, but the resentment of the Insubres and Boii fed Hannibal's plan for an Italian campaign. When Hannibal crossed the Alps in 218 BC, the Taurini, who were at odds with the Insubres, resisted him, and he had to storm their chief place, Taurasia (modern Turin). The Insubres went over to Hannibal, and Gallic troops became a major and frequently replenished component of the Carthaginian army. Rome meanwhile founded the colonies of Placentia and Cremona in 218 BC to control the Po where it divided the two great Gallic peoples.

After the Battle of the Metaurus in 207 BC, the struggle for the Po plain went on for a decade. The Cenomani, until then loyal to Rome, now joined the Insubres and Boii, provoked by the planting of Cremona in a strategically important part of Insubrian territory. Led by the Carthaginian officer Hamilcar, they took Placentia and Cremona in 201 BC but were defeated before the latter the next year. The Insubres submitted in 197 BC, and the coalition was finally broken after two battles fought near Mediolanum in 194 BC.

The Insubres were treated more leniently than the Boii, who were exterminated, enslaved or driven out. They kept a formal independence as a federated state, though their eastern frontier was probably brought back from the Oglio to the Adda for the benefit of Cremona. Kruta attributes the difference to their native roots, the elimination of the Boii amounting to a return to the situation before the invasion of the early 4th century BC. After the northern wars Rome bound the Insubres, like the Cenomani, by a treaty (foedus): they retained their territory and their traditional social and political order but owed tribute and, when required, military contingents.

=== Under Roman rule ===
A clause of the treaty, recorded by Cicero, barred any member of the Insubres from being granted Roman citizenship. Following Emilio Gabba, J. H. C. Williams argues that this exclusion helped preserve the existing social structure and so encouraged the survival of the Insubres as a community into the late Republic. In his reading, the legal use of these Roman categories in turn gave the Transpadane peoples a new sense of ethnic identity. Like the other Transpadane peoples the Insubres passed through a Gallo-Roman period in the 2nd and 1st centuries BC. The lex Pompeia of 89 BC granted Latin rights to the Transpadani, full Roman citizenship followed in 49 BC, and after the province was dissolved the area was organized as Regio XI Transpadana, in which the Insubres ceased to exist as a distinct people.

Cato, writing in the mid-2nd century BC, knew the region at first hand. He credited the Insubres with a large annual export of cured pork into Italy (Note: The fragment of Cato's Origines is corrupt, and the reference to the Insubres rests on an emendation of the transmitted in scrobes to Insubres, adopted by editors from Turnèbe onward.) and measured Lake Como at sixty Roman miles. In the funerary record, weaponry disappeared as grave goods earliest among the Insubres, while new status markers such as the vaso a trottola, a locally produced wine vessel, spread through their territory.

== Settlement and material culture ==
=== Mediolanum and the urban network ===
The name Mediolanum combines the Celtic elements medio- and lāno-, 'the middle of the plain'. The town stood on a site already occupied in the Golasecca period. Its role as the center of the Insubres is first recorded by Polybius for the events of 222 BC, while Livy ties its foundation to the formation of the people. Polybius mentions a federal sanctuary of a war goddess, whom he equates with Athena, in which the gold standards called immovable were kept in peacetime, and which the context places at Mediolanum. Excavations beneath Milan have revealed, several meters down, an Iron Age ditch filled in about the middle of the 2nd century BC, when the oppidum was rebuilt as a Roman town, together with a locally minted silver coin.

Ancient writers credit the Insubres with founding cities, which sets them apart from the peoples of the 4th-century invasion, who inherited an existing urban network but do not appear to have created such centers. The sieges of Acerrae and Mediolanum show that both were fortified places of some size. In the Transpadane plain the political unity of a Gallic people rested on a capital such as Mediolanum and on strategic centers such as Acerrae, a pattern that contrasts with the dispersed, village-based settlement of the plain south of the Po.

=== Coinage ===
From the 3rd century BC the western Cisalpine peoples used a silver coinage modeled on the drachma of Massalia, the so-called Padane drachma, and Mediolanum was probably one of its mints. From about 100 BC the coins carry legends in the Lepontic alphabet, among them rikos (from rix, 'king') and toutiopouos, concentrated in Insubrian territory. A hoard from Manerbio contained some 1,400 toutiopouos coins.

=== Writing ===
The Insubres used an alphabet of Etruscan origin, the so-called Lepontic or Lugano script, adopted in the 6th century BC and current among them down to the 1st century BC, a usage that distinguished them from their eastern neighbors. Their epigraphy, on stone, on pottery and on coins, is the richest body of texts directly recorded by a Celtic people before the 1st century BC. It includes the bilingual inscription of Vercellae (modern Vercelli) and the funerary stele of San Bernardino di Briona, which names a Quintus Legatos, son of Dannotalos, and so documents the progress of Romanization.
