= Marcus Claudius Marcellus =

Roman general and politician (c. 270–208 BC)

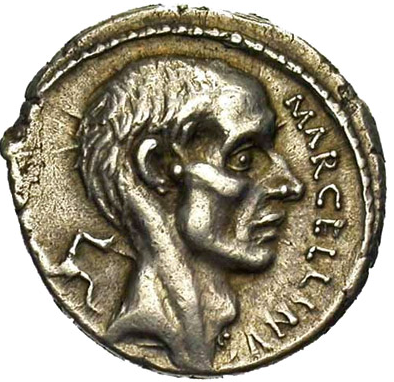
- Coin depicting Marcellus, 55 BC

Consul
- In office 208 BC
- In office 210 BC
- In office 214 BC
- In office 215 BC
- In office 222 BC

Aedile
- In office 226 BC

Personal details
- Born: c. 270 BC
- Died: 208 BC near Venusia, Italy
- Cause of death: Killed in action (impaled by a spear)
- Children: Marcellus
- Occupation: General; politician
Marcus Claudius Marcellus
- Military career
- Allegiance: Roman Republic
- Conflicts: First Punic War; Roman–Gallic War of 225 BC; Battle of Clastidium; Second Punic War; Siege of Syracuse; Battle of Numistro
- Awards: Spolia opima

Marcus Claudius Marcellus (/mɑːrˈsɛləs/; c. 270 – 208 BC) was a Roman general and politician in the 3rd century BC who was elected consul of the Roman Republic five times (222, 215, 214, 210, and 208 BC). Marcellus gained the most prestigious award a Roman general could earn, the spolia opima, for killing the Gallic king Viridomarus in single combat in 222 BC at the Battle of Clastidium. Furthermore, he is noted for having conquered the fortified city of Syracuse in a protracted siege during which Archimedes, the famous mathematician, scientist, and inventor, was killed, despite Marcellus ordering the soldiers under his command not to harm him. Marcus Claudius Marcellus died in battle in 208 BC, leaving behind a legacy of military conquests and a reinvigorated Roman legend of the spolia opima.

== Early life ==
Little is known of Marcus Claudius Marcellus' early years, since ancient historians and biographers were more concerned with the military exploits which came at the apex of his career. The fullest extant account is Plutarch's "Life of Marcellus", which focuses on warfare and political attainments and largely skips over events before 225 BC, beyond some general information about Marcellus' youth. Marcellus' exact birth date is unknown, yet scholars are certain he was born prior to 268 BC because he had to be over 42 when elected consul in 222 BC and he was elected to a fifth (and final) consulship for 208 BC, after he was 60. He was said by Poseidonius to have been the first in his family to take on the cognomen of Marcellus, yet there are genealogical records of his family line tracing the cognomen back to 331 BC. According to Plutarch, Marcellus was a skilled fighter in his youth and was raised with the purpose of entering military service. In his youth, Marcellus quickly distinguished himself as an ambitious warrior, known for his skill in hand-to-hand combat. He is noted for having saved the life of his brother, Otacilius, when the two were surrounded by enemy soldiers in Italy.

During his time as a Roman soldier, which included service in the First Punic War, Marcellus was praised by his superiors for his skill and valor. As a result of his fine reputation, in 226 BC he was elected to the position of curule aedile. Aediles were overseers of public buildings and festivals and enforcers of public order, and the office generally served as the first step in a Roman nobleman's political career. Around the same time that he became an aedile, Marcellus was also awarded the position of augur, which Plutarch describes as being an interpreter of omens. By about the age of 40, Marcellus had already become an acclaimed soldier and public official. His early career came to a close in 222 BC with his election as consul, the highest political and military office in the Roman Republic.

== Middle life ==
Led by the Insubrians, the Gauls of northern Italy declared war on Rome in 225 BC. Marcellus participated, initially as a soldier, in the ensuing conflict, which saw the Insubrians pushed all the way back to the Po River. They attempted to surrender, but Marcellus persuaded the two acting consuls not to accept the terms of peace. In the fourth and final year of the war, Marcellus himself was elected consul, with Gnaeus Cornelius Scipio Calvus as his colleague. As the new consuls were ushered into office, the Insubrians mustered 30,000 of their Gallic allies, the Gaesatae, to fight the Romans. Marcellus invaded Insubrian lands up to the Po River, just as the previous consuls had done. From here, the Gauls sent 10,000 men across the Po and attacked Clastidium, a Roman stronghold, to divert the Roman attacks. This battlefield was the stage for Marcellus’ confrontation with the Gallic king, Viridomarus, which cemented his place in history.

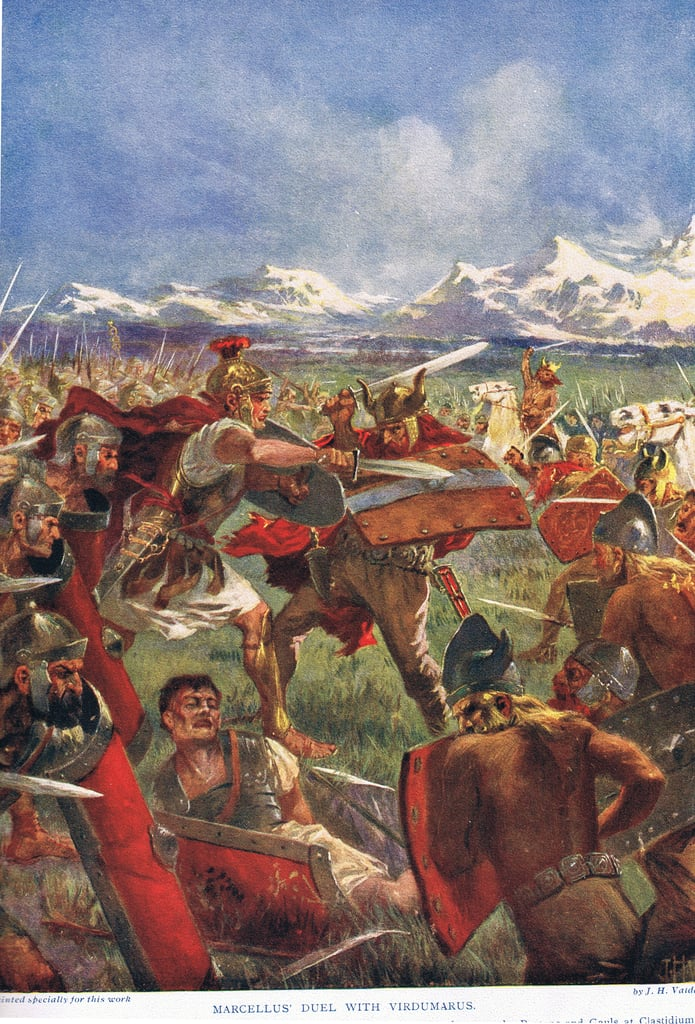
Marcus Claudius Marcellus fights Viridomarus in single combat, as envisaged by painter John Harris Valda.

The confrontation, as told by Plutarch, is so heavy in detail that one might question the veracity of his narration. Plutarch recounts that, prior to the battle, Viridomarus spotted Marcellus, who wore commander's insignia, and rode out to meet him. Marcellus did not recognize the king, but nonetheless wanted to fight: he had prayed to the gods to give him the finest armor possessed by the enemy, and the armor worn by Viridomarus seemed to fit this description. The two engaged in single combat, which concluded when Marcellus, “by a thrust of his spear which pierced his adversary's breastplate, and by the impact of his horse in full career, threw him, still living, upon the ground, where, with a second and third blow, he promptly killed him.” Marcellus carried away the armor of his fallen foe, calling it the spolia opima, or richest spoils, and dedicated it to Jupiter Feretrius, as he had promised before the battle. In Roman tradition, spolia opima was considered the most prestigious and honorable prize that a general could earn. To deserve the title, the spoils must be taken from the leader of the opposing army, whom the general had killed in single combat.

Herein lies a wrinkle in Plutarch's retelling of the event. Marcellus allegedly did not recognize his opponent, but his prayer to Jupiter Feretrius, employing the term spolia opima, implies an intention to kill a king or ruler. This inconsistency indicates that Plutarch's story may have been exaggerated for dramatic effect, causing discrepancies. Furthermore, Plutarch had probably written the account to glorify Marcellus as a hero of Rome, instead of as a record of history. The considerably earlier account of Polybius (Polyb. 2.34) does not at all mention the spolia opima in relation to Marcellus.

Following the death of Viridomarus, the outnumbered Romans broke the siege of Clastidium, won the battle and proceeded to push the Gallic army all the way back to their primary headquarters at Mediolanum. Here, following another defeat, the Gauls surrendered to the Romans. This time the terms of peace were acceptable to the Romans, and the Gallic war ended. Polybius, a client to the Scipiones, states that much of the overall success in the Gallic War belongs to Marcellus’ colleague, Scipio, but we know from other sources that, having won the spolia opima, Marcellus was awarded a triumph. Following the Gallic wars, Marcellus seems to drop below the historical radar until the year 216 BC, ushering in the latter part of his life.

== Later life ==
Hannibal and Marcellus maneuver in Campania, 216 BC

Marcus Claudius Marcellus re-emerged onto both the political and military scene during the Second Punic War, in which he took part in important battles. In 216 BC, the third year of the Second Punic War, Marcellus was elected as a praetor. A praetor served either as an elected magistrate or as the commander of an army, the latter of which duties Marcellus was selected to fulfil in Sicily. Unfortunately, as Marcellus and his men were preparing to ship to Sicily, his army was recalled to Rome owing to the devastating losses at Cannae, one of the worst defeats in Roman history. By the orders of the Senate, Marcellus was forced to dispatch 1,500 of his men to Rome to protect the city after the terrible defeat by Hannibal of Carthage. With his remaining army, along with remnants of the army from Cannae (who were considered to have been disgraced by the defeat and by surviving it), Marcellus camped near Suessula, a city in the region of Campania in southern Italy. At this point, part of the Carthaginian army began to make a move for the city of Nola. Marcellus repelled the attacks and managed to keep the city from the grasp of Hannibal. Although the battle at Nola was rather unimportant in regards to the Second Punic War as a whole, the victory was “important from its moral effect, as the first check, however slight, that Hannibal had yet received.”

Then, in 215 BC, Marcellus was summoned to Rome by the Dictator Marcus Junius Pera, who wanted to consult with him about the future conduct of the war. After this meeting, Marcellus was made proconsul. In the same year, when the consul Lucius Postumius Albinus was killed in battle, Marcellus was unanimously chosen by the Roman people to be his successor. Livy and Plutarch tell us a bad omen occurred, allegedly because the other consul was also a plebeian. Marcellus stepped aside and Quintus Fabius Maximus Verrucosus took his place. Supposedly, the senate (interpreting the gods) disapproved of having two plebeian consuls. Marcellus was appointed proconsul, whereupon, he defended the city of Nola, once again, from the rear guard of Hannibal's army. The following year, 214 BC, Marcellus was elected consul yet again, this time with Fabius Maximus. For a third time, Marcellus defended Nola from Hannibal and even captured the small but significant town of Casilinum.

=== Sicily and Syracuse ===
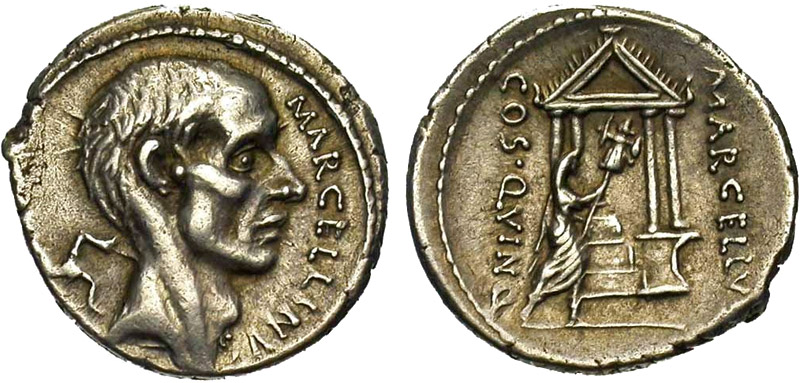
Coin of 55 BC, posthumously honoring Marcellus: the reverse shows him dedicating the spolia opima to Jupiter, while the triskelion on the obverse celebrates his victory in Sicily

Following his victory at Casilinum, Marcellus was sent to Sicily, upon which Hannibal had set his sights. Upon arrival, Marcellus found the island in disarray. Hieronymus, the new ruler of the Roman-ally Kingdom of Syracuse, had recently come to the throne on his grandfather's death and fallen under the influence of the Carthaginian agents Hippocrates and Epicydes. He then declared war against the Romans after the Carthaginian victory at the Battle of Cannae. However, Hieronymus was soon deposed; the new Syracusan leaders attempted a reconciliation with Rome, but could not quell their suspicions and then aligned themselves with the Carthaginians. In 214 BC, the same year that he was sent to Sicily, Marcellus attacked the city of Leontini, where the two Syracusan rulers were residing. After successfully storming the city, Marcellus had 2,000 Roman deserters (who had been hiding in the city) killed, and moved to lay siege to Syracuse itself. At this point, several cities in the province of Sicily rose in rebellion against Roman rule. The siege lasted for two years, partly because the Roman effort was thwarted by the military machines of the famous inventor Archimedes. Meanwhile, leaving the bulk of the Roman legion in the command of Appius Claudius at Syracuse, Marcellus and a small army roamed Sicily, conquering opponents and taking such rebellious cities as Helorus, Megara, and Herbessus.

After Marcellus returned and continued the siege, the Carthaginians attempted to relieve the city, but were driven back. Overcoming formidable resistance and the ingenious devices of Archimedes, the Romans finally took the city in the summer of 212 BC. Plutarch wrote that Marcellus, when he had previously entered the city for a diplomatic meeting with the Syracusans, had noticed a weak point in its fortifications. He made his attack at this fragile spot, using a night attack by a small group of hand-picked soldiers to storm the walls and open the gates. During the fighting, Archimedes was killed, an act Marcellus regretted. Plutarch writes that the Romans rampaged through the city, taking much of the plunder and artwork they could find. This has significance because Syracuse was a Greek city filled with Greek culture, art and architecture. Much of this Greek art was taken to Rome, where it was one of the first major impacts of Greek influence on Roman culture.

Following his victory at Syracuse, Marcellus remained in Sicily, where he defeated more Carthaginians and rebels. The important city of Agrigentum was still under Carthaginian control, though there was now little the Carthaginian leadership could do to support it, as the campaigns against the Romans in Spain and Italy now took precedence. At the end of 211 BC, Marcellus resigned from command of the Sicilian province, thereby putting the praetor of the region, Marcus Cornelius Cethegus, in charge. On his return to Rome, Marcellus did not receive the triumphal honours that would be expected for such a feat, as his political enemies objected that he had not fully eradicated the threats in Sicily.

== Death ==
The final period of Marcus Claudius Marcellus’ life began with his fourth election to Roman consul in 210 BC. Marcellus’ election to office sparked much controversy and resentment towards Marcellus because of accusations by political opponents that his actions in Sicily were excessively brutal. Representatives of Sicilian cities presented themselves before the senate to complain about Marcellus' past actions. The complaints prevailed and Marcellus was forced to switch control of provinces with his colleague, so that Marcellus was not the consul in control of Sicily. On switching provinces, Marcellus took command of the Roman army in Apulia, leading it to many decisive victories against the Carthaginians. First, Marcellus took the city of Salapia and then continued along his way by conquering two cities in the region of Samnium. Next, when the army of Gnaeus Fulvius, another Roman general, was completely dismantled by Hannibal, Marcellus and his army stepped in to check the progress of the Carthaginian leader. Then Marcellus and Hannibal fought a battle at Numistro, where a clear victory could not be decided, although Rome claimed a victory. Following this battle, Marcellus continued to keep Hannibal in check, yet the two armies never met in a decisive battle. This can be seen as the result of a deliberate strategy of attrition warfare on Marcellus' part. (Attrition warfare as a strategy against Hannibal was originally pioneered by Marcellus's friend, Fabius Maximus, who was given the (originally derogatory) nickname "Cunctator", or "the delayer".) Livy reports Marcellus describing the Carthaginians as "the men whom you wore down in skirmishes...whose tracks you have dogged".

In 209 BC, Marcellus was named as a proconsul and retained control of his army. During that year, the Roman army under Marcellus faced Hannibal's forces in a series of skirmishes and raids, without being drawn into open battle - Marcellus' particular strategy. Marcellus defended his actions and tactics in front of the senate and he was named a consul for the fifth time for the year 208 BC. After entering his fifth consulship Marcellus re-entered the field and took command of the army at Venusia. While on a reconnaissance mission with his colleagues Titus Quinctius Crispinus and Manius Aulius, and a small band of 220 horsemen, the group was ambushed and nearly completely slaughtered by a much larger Carthaginian force of Numidian horsemen. Marcellus was impaled by a spear and died on the field. In the following days, Crispinus died of his wounds.

When Hannibal heard of Marcellus' death he travelled to see the body, allowed Marcellus a proper funeral, and even sent the ashes back to Marcellus’ son in a silver urn with a golden wreath. According to Cornelius Nepos and Valerius Maximus the ashes never made it to his son but Augustus Caesar stated that the urn was delivered. The loss of both consuls was a major blow to Roman morale, as the Republic had lost its two senior military commanders in a single battle, while the formidable Carthaginian army was still at large in Italy.

== Historical significance ==
Marcus Claudius Marcellus' winning of the spolia opima earned him great fame in his lifetime. The spolia opima was one of the highest honors that could be bestowed on a Roman general. Plutarch informs us how the spolia opima was acquired, stating that, "only those spoils are ‘opima’ which are taken first, in a pitched battle, where general slays general." Only two others in Roman history, Romulus, the founder of Rome, and Aulus Cornelius Cossus, were allegedly honored with this prize. Marcellus is the only one of the three whose achievement has been historically confirmed. In terms of the history of the spolia opima, Marcellus holds great significance because he reinvigorated the meaning of the honored prize. Prior to Marcellus, the spolia opima was not of special importance in the minds of Romans because it had happened only twice before, if at all. Furthermore, the actual ritual of the spolia opima was not confirmed until Marcellus made it customary to dedicate the armor to Jupiter Feretrius. No one else accomplished the same feat to continue the tradition. In this way, Marcellus publicized the winning of the spolia opima and turned it into a legend.

Marcellus was an important general during the Second Punic War and his five-time election as a consul has its place in Roman history. His decisive victories in Sicily were of history-altering proportions, while his campaigns in Italy itself gave Hannibal himself pause and reinvigorated the Roman Senate. But it is Marcellus’ triumph as a warrior and winner of a spolia opima that confirmed his place in ancient Roman history. Due to all of this, he is known as the Sword of Rome. Plutarch also emphasized the service of Marcellus as "the civilizer of Rome," one of the first to bring Greek art and learning to the Italian city.

== Bibliography ==
- Flower, Harriet I., "The Tradition of the Spolia Opima: M. Claudius Marcellus and Augustus", Classical Antiquity, Apr. 2000: 37.
- Lendering, Jona. "Marcus Claudius Marcellus", Livius: Articles on Ancient History Archived 2013-12-21 at the Wayback Machine, 26 Nov. 2008.
- McCall, Jeremiah (2012).The Sword of Rome: A Biography of Marcus Claudius Marcellus. Pen&Sword 2012.
- Plutarch's "Life of Marcellus", The Parallel Lives, 30 Apr. 2008, 26 Nov. 2008 (Plutarch's "Life of Marcellus" Mirror at Massachusetts Institute of Technology)
- Chisholm, Hugh, ed. (1911). "Marcellus" . Encyclopædia Britannica. Vol. 17 (11th ed.). Cambridge University Press. p. 685.
- This article incorporates text from a publication now in the public domain: Smith, William, ed. (1870). "Marcellus Claudius (4)". Dictionary of Greek and Roman Biography and Mythology. Vol. 2. pp. 927–31.

Preceded by Gaius Flaminius; Publius Furius Philus	Roman consul 222 BC with Gnaeus Cornelius Scipio Calvus	Succeeded by Publius Cornelius Scipio Asina; Marcus Minucius Rufus
Preceded by Lucius Postumius Albinus	Roman consul II; 215 BC (suffect, abdicated) with Tiberius Sempronius Gracchus	Succeeded by Quintus Fabius Maximus Verrucosus
Preceded by Tiberius Sempronius Gracchus; Quintus Fabius Maximus Verrucosus	Roman consul III; 214 BC with Quintus Fabius Maximus Verrucosus	Succeeded by Quintus Fabius Maximus; Tiberius Sempronius Gracchus
Preceded by Gnaeus Fulvius Centumalus Maximus; Publius Sulpicius Galba Maximus	Roman consul IV; 210 BC with Marcus Valerius Laevinus	Succeeded by Quintus Fabius Maximus Verrucosus; Quintus Fulvius Flaccus
Preceded by Quintus Fabius Maximus Verrucosus; Quintus Fulvius Flaccus	Roman consul V 208 BC with Titus Quinctius Crispinus	Succeeded by Gaius Claudius Nero; Marcus Livius Salinator
