= Spolia opima =

Highest war trophy for an Ancient Roman

The spolia opima (Latin for 'rich spoils') were the armour, arms, and other effects that an ancient Roman general stripped from the body of an opposing commander slain in single combat. The spolia opima were regarded as the most honourable of the several types of war trophies a commander could obtain, including enemy military standards and the beaks of warships.

== Royal and Republican periods ==
For the majority of the city's existence, the Romans recognized only three instances when spolia opima were taken. The precedent was imagined in Rome's mythical history, which tells that in 752 BC Romulus defeated and stripped Acron, king of the Caeninenses, following the Rape of the Sabine Women. In the second instance, Aulus Cornelius Cossus obtained the spolia opima from Lars Tolumnius, king of the Veientes, during Rome's semi-legendary fifth century BC.

The third and most historically grounded occurred before the Second Punic War, when Marcus Claudius Marcellus (consul 222 BC) galloped forward beyond his battle line and speared the Celtic warrior Viridomarus, a king of the Gaesatae, before stripping him of his armour on the battlefield.

The ceremony of the spolia opima was a ritual of state religion that was supposed to emulate the archaic ceremonies carried out by the founder Romulus. The victor affixed the stripped armor to the trunk of an oak tree, carried it himself in a procession to the Capitoline, and dedicated it at the Temple of Jupiter Feretrius.

To dedicate the spoils to Jupiter Feretrius, one needed be the commander of a Roman army. Thus, Titus Manlius Torquatus, Valerius Corvus and Scipio Aemilianus, though they all slew enemy leaders in single combat (the first two against Gauls and Aemilianus against a king in Hispania), were not considered to have won the spolia opima.

== Imperial period ==
During the early years of the imperial regime, in 27 BC, M Licinius Crassus (grandson of the triumvir) after victories in Macedonia requested a triumph and right to dedicate spolia opima due to his slaying of an enemy chieftain in hand-to-hand combat. Dedication rights were denied by Augustus. Crassus' illustrious political lineage made him a potential rival to Augustus. While Crassus' triumph was granted, it was required to be a joint triumph with Augustus who may have argued he deserved it due to his also holding imperium in Macedonia.

Nero Claudius Drusus, Augustus’s stepson, sought out Germanic chieftains to face in single combat during his campaigns. Sources suggest that he eventually may have been able to take the spolia opima.

== See also ==
Media related to Spolia opima at Wikimedia Commons

- Tropaion
- Roman triumph
