= Sardinia and Corsica =

Ancient Roman province

Provincia Sardinia et Corsica
- Province of the Roman Empire
- 238 BC–AD 455
- Province of Sardinia and Corsica within the Empire (125 AD)
- Capital: Carales
- Area
  - Coordinates: 39°15′N 09°03′E
- History
  - Roman annexation: 238 BC
  - Split into two provinces: AD 6
  - Capture by Vandals: AD 455
Preceded by	Succeeded by
Carthaginian Empire	Vandal Kingdom
- Today part of: France; Italy

The Province of Sardinia and Corsica (Latin: Provincia Sardinia et Corsica) was an ancient Roman province that encompassed the Mediterranean islands of Sardinia and Corsica. It was created after the Roman conquest of the islands during the First Punic War (264–241 BC), and existed up to the administrative reforms of Augustus in the year 6 AD, when it was split into two separate provinces, Sardinia and Corsica. Both provinces continued to exist until the Vandal conquest of the 5th century.

== Pre-Roman times ==
The Roman Empire in the time of Hadrian (ruled AD 117–138), showing the senatorial province of Sardinia and Corsica, two islands in the central Mediterranean Sea

The Nuragic civilization flourished in Sardinia from 1800 to 500 BC. The ancient Sardinians, also known as Nuragics, traded with many different Mediterranean peoples during the Bronze Age and early Iron Age, especially with the Myceneans and the Cypriots. Sardinians also built many coastal settlements, like Nora and Tharros, and the characteristic tower buildings the island is known for, the nuraghes. The similar Torrean civilization also developed in Southern Corsica, where several torri were built. The ancient Sardinians had reached a high level of cultural complexity, building large federal sanctuaries, where the Nuragic communities gathered to participate in the same rituals during festivities. The Nuragic people were able to organize themselves and accomplish several complex projects, such as building refined temples, hydraulic implants like fountains and aqueducts, and creating life sized statues despite the lack of an elite and lacking virtually any degree of social stratification.

The Phoenicians later established several commercial stations in the coast of Sardinia, the Sardinians and Phoenicians coexisted in urban centers across the coasts. Along with them went the Greeks, who founded the colonies of Alalia in Corsica, and Olbia in Sardinia. The Carthaginians, then a Phoenician dependency, conquered Alalia in 535 BC with the Etruscans' help. After Corsica, even part of Sardinia came under the control of the Carthaginians.

== History ==
While Carthage was occupied with the Mercenary War, Rome broke the terms of a treaty made after the First Punic War and annexed Sardinia and Corsica by force. In 238 BC the Carthaginians surrendered their claim to the islands, which together became a province of Rome. This marked the beginning of Roman domination in the Western Mediterranean. The Romans ruled the area for 694 years.

The Nuragic Sardinians and Corsicans, however, often rebelled against the Roman rulers. A revolt broke out in 235 BC, but it was violently suppressed by Manlius Torquatus, who celebrated a triumph over the Sardinians. Other revolts arose in 233 BC and were repressed as well by the consul Spurius Carvilius Maximus Ruga, who celebrated with a triumph the same year. In 232 BC, the Sardinians were defeated again, this time by the consul Manlus Pompilus who was granted the honor of celebrating a triumph. In 231 BC, in light of the widespread tensions, a consular army was sent to deal with each island: one against the Corsicans, commanded by Gaius Papirius Maso, and the other one against the Sardinians, led by Marcus Pomponius Matho. However, the consuls did not manage to report a triumph since both campaigns failed. A mass revolt, known as Bellum Sardum, broke out during the Second Punic War in 216 BC: a massive Sardinian rebellion led by the landowner Hampsicora, a native of the city of Cornus, who commanded an army of natives and allied Carthaginians with the title of Dux Sardorum, and aided the Sardinian army with 15,000 foot soldiers and 1,500 knights. The Roman and the Sardo-Punic army fought at the Battle of Decimomannu; however, the Romans prevailed, and the rebellion ended with Hampsicora's suicide and the sack of the city of Cornus at the hands of the Roman Army, commanded by Manlius Torquatus.

The 2nd century BC was a period of turmoil in the province. In 181 BC the Corsi, a population living in Southern Corsica and North East Sardinia, rebelled against the Romans. The revolt was stopped by Marcus Pinarius Posca, who killed 2,000 rebels and enslaved a number of them. In 177/176 BC, to quell the rebellion of the Sardinian tribes known as the Balares and the Ilienses, the Senate sent the consul Tiberius Sempronius Gracchus to be in charge of two legions; each was composed of 5,200 common soldiers and 300 knights, with another 1,200 infantrymen and 600 knights among allies and Latins. It is estimated that around 27,000 Sardinians died in this revolt (12,000 in 177 and 15,000 in 176); following the defeat, the tax burden was doubled on the islanders, and Gracchus obtained a triumph. Livy reports the inscription on the temple of the goddess Mater Matuta, in Rome, in which the winners exhibited a commemorative plaque that said:

Under the command and the auspices of the consul Tiberius Sempronius Gracchus, the legion and the army of the Roman people subjugated Sardinia. More than 80,000 enemies were killed or captured in the province. Conducting things in the happiest way for the Roman State, freeing the friends, restoring the income, he brought back the army safe and sound and rich in booty; for the second time he entered Rome triumphant. In memory of these events, he dedicated this panel to Jupiter.

In 174 BC, another revolt broke out in Sardinia, resulting in a Roman victory by Titus Manlius Torquatus with a strage et fuga Sardorum, leaving an estimated 80,000 Sardinians dead on the battlefield. The following year another uprising occurred in Sardinia, the island's praetor Atilius Servatus was defeated and forced to take refuge on the other island. Atilius asked Rome for reinforcements, which were provided by Gaius Cicerius. Vowing to Juno Moneta to build a temple in case of success, Cicerius reported a victory, killing 7,000 Corsi and enslaving 1,700 of them. In 163 BC, Marcus Juventhius Thalna quashed another revolt without further details about the expedition. It is recorded that upon hearing of the mission accomplished in Sardinia, the Roman Senate announced public prayers and that Thalna himself, being aware of the Roman universal acclaim for the success, experienced such powerful emotions that he died. However, the rebellion must have resumed shortly afterward since Scipio Nasica was later sent to pacify the island.

Two other revolts broke out in 126 and 122 BC and were put down by Lucius Aurelius who celebrated his victory over the Sardinians, and celebrated a triumph afterward. The last major uprising happened in 111 BC, and was repressed by the consul Marcus Caecilius Metellus, who was able to defeat the armies of the coastal and highland Sardinians. He was allowed the honor of celebrating a triumph, the last recorded Roman triumph against the Sardinians. From then on, the Sardinians living on the coastal areas and the lowlands definitely ceased to revolt, but the highland populations continued to rebel from time to time, coming to be known as civitates Barbariae.

In the late Republic, Gaius Marius and Lucius Cornelius Sulla Felix settled their veterans on Corsica and used the islands' grain supply to support their war efforts. Julius Caesar had his delegates capture the islands from Pompey and gained control of the grain supply in the process. The wheat supply fed his army and ensured its victory in the civil war of 49 BC. During the Second Triumvirate, Octavian received the islands as part of his share and used its grain supply to feed his armies against Brutus and Cassius. Between 40 and 38 BC, Sextus Pompey, son of Pompey, and his legate Menas occupied Corsica and terrorised Sardinia, Sicily and even the Italian peninsula with a great pirate fleet. Along with the three Triumvirs, Sextus Pompey was one of the four most significant contenders in the warfare after Julius Caesar's death. His fleet largely consisted of thousands of slaves and he also held many strongholds on Corsica. With it, he so seriously threatened the Roman grain supply that Octavian had to make peace with Sextus Pompey since it was then not possible to beat him. In the Pact of Misenum (39 BC), Sextus Pompey was assigned Corsica and Sardinia, as well as Sicily and Achaia, in return for ending the blockade of the mainland and remaining neutral in the conflict between Octavian and Marc Antony. However, Octavian was not satisfied with the area assigned to him and conflict erupted anew in 38 BC. Pompey again blockaded the Italian mainland, leading to famine. Later that year, Octavian gathered a fleet that was so powerful that defeated Sextus Pompey and became ruler of the area again.

In Augustus's provincial reforms in 27 BC, Sardinia et Corsica became a senatorial province. The province was administered by a proconsul with the rank of a praetor.

=== Division in two provinces ===
In AD 6, the province was divided. Thus, a separate senatorial province of Corsica was established since Augustus had appropriated the island of Sardinia, where a large garrison was kept under arms, as one of his personal provinces. Even after the return of Sardinia to the Senate in AD 67, the two islands remained separate provinces. Sardinia was always ruled by a praefectus (provinciae) Sardiniae and from Claudius on, the main and official title was enriched by the attribute procurator Augusti.

The provinces of Corsica and Sardinia were incorporated into the Diocese of Italy by Diocletian in 292 AD, along with Sicily and Malta. Both provinces continued to exist within the Western Roman Empire, until Vandal conquest in the 5th century.

== Roman opinion of the province ==
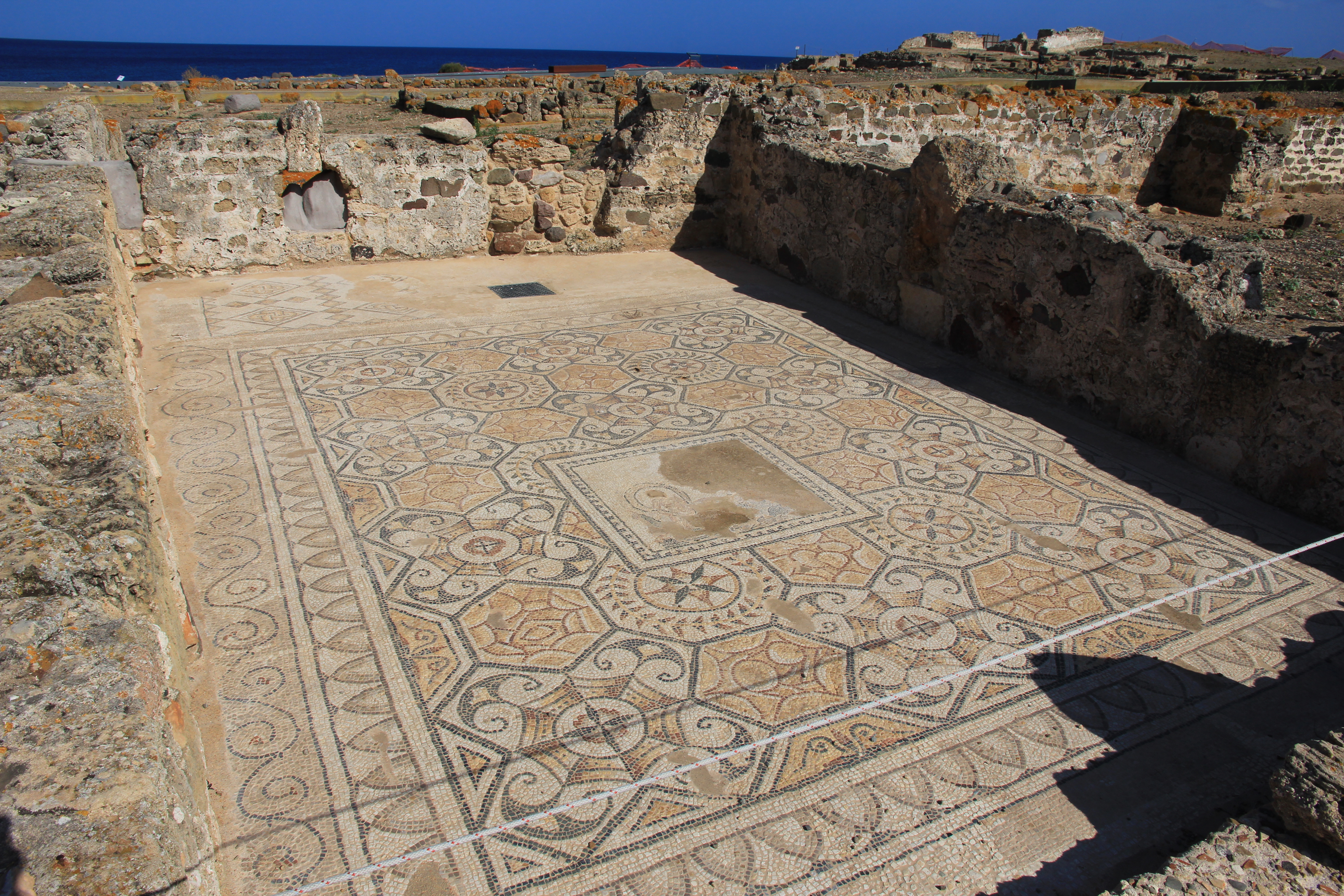
Mosaics from Nora

The coastal regions of both islands were settled by Romans and adopted the Latin language and culture; however, the interior areas of Sardinia and Corsica resisted the invaders. A variety of revolts and uprisings occurred: however, since the interior areas were densely forested, the Romans avoided them and set them aside as Barbaria, i.e. the “land of the barbarians”.

Overall, Corsica and Sardinia became trivial gains compared to the Roman Empire's eastern gains like Roman Egypt. The Romans regarded both the islands and their peoples as backward and unhealthy, in all likelihood due to the long-standing presence of malaria. A 2017 study has in fact demonstrated that malaria was already endemic at least to Sardinia over 2000 years ago, as proven by the presence of beta thalassemia in the DNA of a Sardinian individual buried in the Punic necropolis of Carales.

From Corsica, the Romans did not receive much spoil nor were the prisoners willing to bow to foreign rule, and to learn anything Roman; Strabo, depicting the Corsicans as bestial people resorting to live by plunder, said that “whoever has bought one, aggravating their purchasers by their apathy and insensibility, regrets the waste of his money”. The same went for Sardinian slaves, who acquired an infamous reputation for being untrustworthy and killing their masters if they had the chance.

Since Sardinian captives once flooded the Roman slave markets after a Roman victory over a serious rebellion from the mountain tribes, the proverb Sardi venales ("Sardinians for cheap") became a common Latin expression to indicate anything cheap and worthless, as Livius reported.

Cicero referred to the Sardinians, reportedly ill-disposed as no other towards the Roman people, as "every one worse than his fellow" (alius alio nequior), and to their rebels from the highlands, who kept fighting the Romans in guerrilla-style, as "thieves with rough wool cloaks" (latrones mastrucati). The Roman orator likened the Sardinians to the ancient Berbers of North Africa (A Poenis admixto Afrorum genere Sardi "from the Punics, mixed with [North] African blood, originated the Sardinians", Africa ipsa parens illa Sardiniae "[North] Africa itself is Sardinia's progenitor"), using also the name Afer ([North] African) and Sardus (Sardinian) as interchangeable, to prove their supposed cunning and hideous nature inherited by the former Carthaginian masters. Cicero stated that no Sardinian city had ever been friendly to the Romans.

Varro, following the tradition set by Cicero, used to compare the Sardinians to the Berber tribe of the Getuli, stating that quaedam nationes harum pellibus sunt vestitae, ut in Gaetulia et in Sardinia ("Some barbarous nations use [goat] skins for clothing, like, for instance, in Getulia and Sardinia").

Many of the negative stereotypes were fueled by the Sardinians' deep-seated hostility towards Rome and their frequent rebellions which would last for centuries: even during the 1st century BC, while the rest of the island was mostly brought to the Roman order, the Sardinian highlands were often in turmoil. Strabo mentioned that the populations residing in the mountains were still not completely pacified during his time and eventually resorted to living off plunder, pillaging other Sardinian communities and sailing with their ships to raid the Etrurian shores; in particular, they often committed acts of piracy against the city of Pisa.

However, some Romans held a positive opinion of the Sardinians; Caesar, for instance, memorized his uncle's oration Pro Sardis, an oration in favor of the Sardinians, and he was a close friend of the Sardinian singer Tigellius. The city of Carales was in fact a supporter of Caesar and the populares as well, and aided him with some troops during the battle of Thapsus.

== Relationship to Rome ==
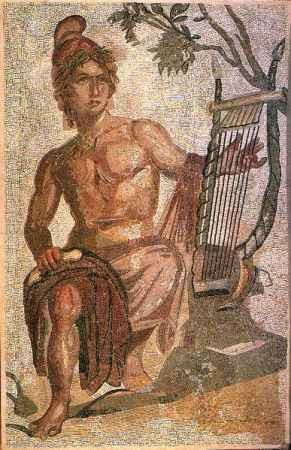
Mosaic from Carales depicting Orpheus

Corsica and Sardinia were kept in a scarcely urbanised state and came mostly to be used as places of exile. Gaius Cassius Longinus, the lawyer accused of conspiracy by Nero, was sent to the province, while Anicentus, murderer of the elder Agrippina, was specifically sent to Sardinia. Many Jews and Christians were also sent to the islands under Tiberius. Christians were often exiled to Sardinia, so that they would be forced to work in its rich mines or in the quarries (damnatio ad metalla).

Entrenched indigenous resistance to cultural and political assimilation emerges in inscriptional evidence from former Carthaginian settlements. Punic-style magistrates, the sufetes, wielded local control in Nora and Tharros through the end of the first century BCE, although two sufetes existed in Bithia as late as the mid-second century CE.

While neglected, the islands nonetheless ended up playing a significant role in the Empire's happenings. While Sardinia provided Rome with much of the grain supply during the times of the Roman Republic, Corsica did as well with wax to the Empire. Moreover, among all the Western Roman provinces, Sardinia provided the biggest number of sailors to the Roman military fleets. Sardinia was also one of the main metal suppliers of the Roman world; thanks to its rich silver, lead and copper mines, Sardinia ranked third among all the Roman provinces in quantity of metals produced next to Britain and Hispania. Mining production during the Roman rule was estimated at about six hundred thousand tons of lead and one thousand tons of silver.

Only a few Sardinians are known to have obtained the rank of senator or equites during the imperial era. The Sardinian Marcus Erennius Severus became legatus of Judea and obtained the rank of praetor during the middle of the second century AD. Quintus Aurelius Symmachus mentions some senators of Sardinian origins in his epistles such as Ampelius, who were accused of having sided with Magnus Maximus against Theodosius.

== Major cities ==
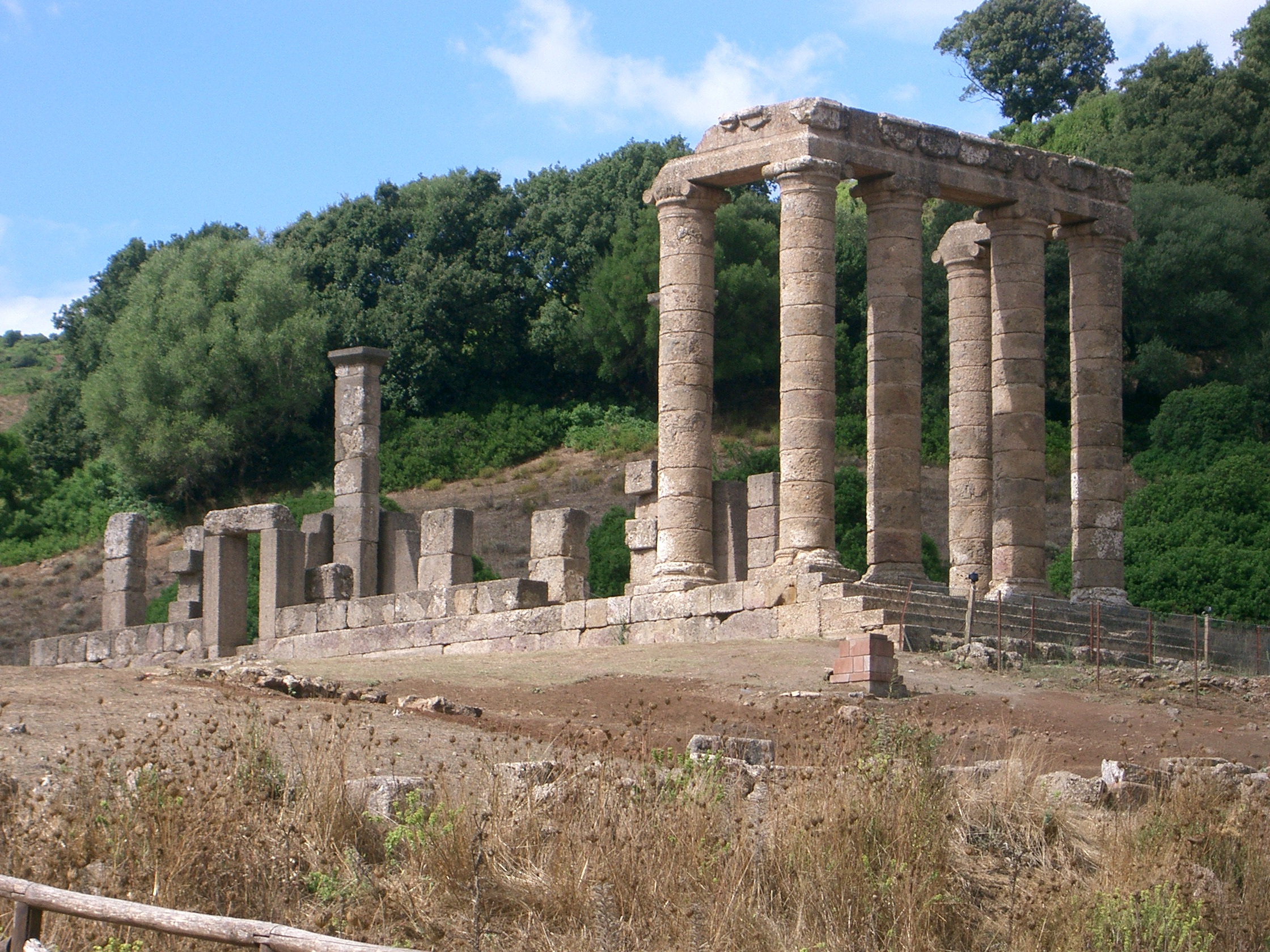
Antas Temple

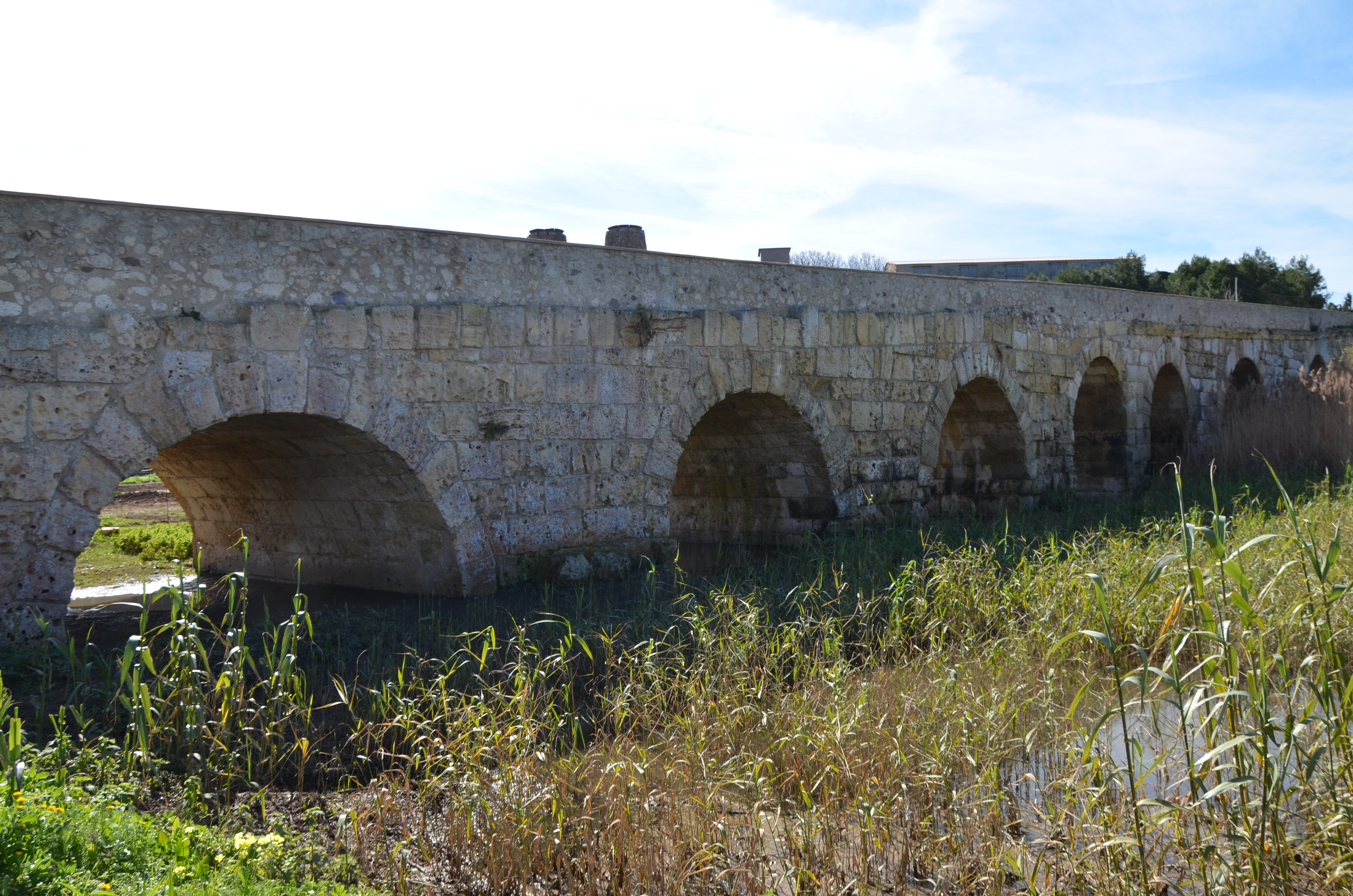
Roman bridge of Turris Libisonis, Porto Torres, Sardinia

Carales was the biggest city in the entire province, reaching a population of 30,000 inhabitants. Its existence as an urban center went back to at least the 8th century BC, with Florus calling it urbs urbium, the city among the cities. Sardinia and Carales came under Roman rule in 238 BC, shortly after the First Punic War, when the Romans defeated the Carthaginians. No mention of it is found on the occasion of the Roman conquest of the island, but during the Second Punic War it served as headquarters to the praetor Titus Manlius Torquatus as he conducted his operations against Hampsicora and the Sardo-Carthaginian army. The most important monuments left of the Roman era are its amphitheater, capable of seating as many as 10,000 spectators, and the ruins of the Roman Villa known as Tigellius' villa.

Sulci was also one of the biggest cities in Sardinia. Its foundation dates back to the 9th century BC. Annexed by the Carthaginians during the 6th century BC, it became one of the largest cities under Carthaginian control, as testified by its massive necropolis which contained more than 1,500 hypogea; by the 5th century BC the city had already reached a population of about 10,000 inhabitants. In 258 BC, a naval battle occurred between the Carthaginian and the Roman forces near the city: after his defeat the commander Hannibal Gisco took refuge in Sulci, but was captured and crucified by his own men. By the Second Punic War the city had come under Roman control. Sulci grew wealthy due to its proximity to the rich lead mines of the Sulcis region, so much so that Caesar was able to exact from it a fine of 10 million sestertii for its having sided with Pompey during the civil war.

Nora, located nearby the modern city of Pula, was instead regarded by the ancient authors as the oldest city in Sardinia. Indeed, the Nora stone, an ancient Phoenician text that was found in the city, testifies the site's significance as a port already in the 9th century BC. Many beautiful Roman mosaics can still be spotted to this day, and its theater is one of the best preserved Roman monuments on the island.

The city of Tharros, located on the western side of the island on the Sinis peninsula, was one of the main producers of jewels in the Punic world, as testified by the rich funerary kits found in the Punic necropolis. It was one of the cities that rebelled against Roman rule during the Second Punic War and supported Hampsicora's revolt.

Located on the northeastern side of Sardinia, Olbia was a rich port town. Although its name seems to be of Greek origin, the city was already under Carthaginian control by the 5th century BC. Its massive walls, still visible today, date back to the 4th century BC. Its strategic position in the Mediterranean trade routes was indisputable, so much that when the Romans occupied the island in 238 BC, the city became an important military base for the Roman navy. Like the other major Roman cities on the island, Olbia was provided with public baths and a forum. Other noteworthy cities were Othoca, Neapolis, Bithia and finally Cornus, the native city of Hampsicora. Bosa was also likely settled since ancient times as an inscription dating to the 8th century BC testifies.

In addition to the aforementioned cities, the Romans founded a few colonies, the two major ones being Turris Libisonis and Forum Traiani. Turris Libisonis, situated in the northwest of the island, prospered thanks to the rich plains of the Nurra and its ideal position as a port; its majestic baths and mosaics are well preserved even today. Forum Traiani was situated in the fertile plains of the Campidano area and became famous for its baths, which were believed to have therapeutic properties.

The most important city in Corsica was Aleria, founded in the 7th century BC by the Phocaean Greeks and later conquered by the Etruscans after the battle of Alalia. Aiacium also began as a Phocaean port. Gaius Marius founded Mariana in the north of Corsica in 93 BC.
