= Asdrubal =

Asdrubal or Asdrúbal is a Spanish masculine given name which may refer to:

- Asdrubal Bentes (1939–2020), Brazilian politician and lawyer
- Asdrúbal Cabrera (born 1985), Major League Baseball player from Venezuela
- Asdrúbal Chávez, Venezuelan chemical engineer and politician
- Asdrubal Colmenarez (born 1936), Venezuelan artist
- Asdrúbal Fontes Bayardo (1922–2006), Uruguayan racing driver
- Asdrúbal Padrón (born 1991), Spanish footballer
- Asdrúbal Paniagua (born 1951), Costa Rican retired footballer
- Asdrúbal Sánchez (born 1958), Venezuelan footballer

== See also ==
- Hasdrubal, the original Latin form of the name, chiefly used for Carthaginian leaders
