= Aquae Calidae =

Aquae Calidae, Latin for "hot waters", may refer to:

- Aquae Calidae, ancient name of Caldas de Reis, Spain
- Aquae Calidae, ancient name of Çiftehan, Turkey
- Aquae Calidae, ancient name of Vichy, France
- Aquae Calidae, Algeria
- Aquae Calidae, Bulgaria
- Aquae Calidae Neapolitanorum, Italy
- Aquae Sulis, called "Aquae Calidae" in Ptolemy's Geographia
