= Decimomannu =

Decimomannu Deximumannu / Déximu Mannu (Sardinian)
- Comune
- Comune di Decimomannu
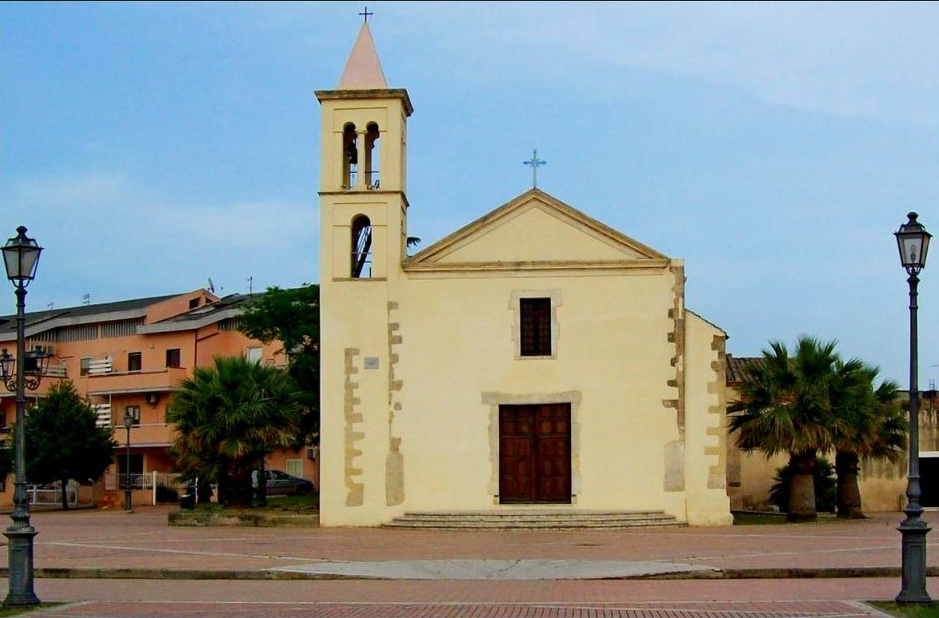
- Church of Santa Greca

- Coat of arms

- Location within Sardinia
- Coordinates: 39°19′N 8°58′E
- Country: Italy
- Region: Sardinia
- Metropolitan city: Cagliari (CA)

Government
  - Mayor: Anna Paola Marongiu

Area
  - Total: 28.1 km^{2} (10.8 sq mi)
- Elevation: 12 m (39 ft)

Population (2025)
  - Total: 8,355
  - Density: 297/km^{2} (770/sq mi)
- Demonym: Decimanamesi
- Time zone: UTC+1 (CET)
  - Summer (DST): UTC+2 (CEST)
- Postal code: 09033
- Dialing code: 070

Decimomannu (Sardinian: Deximumannu or Déximu Mannu [ˌdeʒimuˈmanːu]) is a comune (municipality) in the Metropolitan City of Cagliari in the region of Sardinia in Italy, located about 17 km (11 mi) northwest of central Cagliari. It has 8,355 inhabitants.

== History ==
Decimomannu's origins date back at least to Roman times, as attested by its Latin name, meaning "the biggest town located ten miles from Cagliari". Its earlier history was revealed when a necropolis from Phoenician-Punic times was found in 1879–80. It was the location of the battle of Decimomannu during the revolt of Hampsicora.

After belonging to the Byzantine Empire, in the Middle Ages it became part of the Giudicato of Cagliari. Several giudici (from Latin iudice, literally "judge") established their residences in Decimomannu. After the fall of the Giudicato of Cagliari, Decimomannu belonged to the Della Gherardesca family from Pisa. The Battle of Lucocisterna, fought between the Pisane and the Aragonese, took place here in 1324, and after it the town belonged to the latter (with the exception of a short period under the Giudicato of Arborea in 1353–1355).

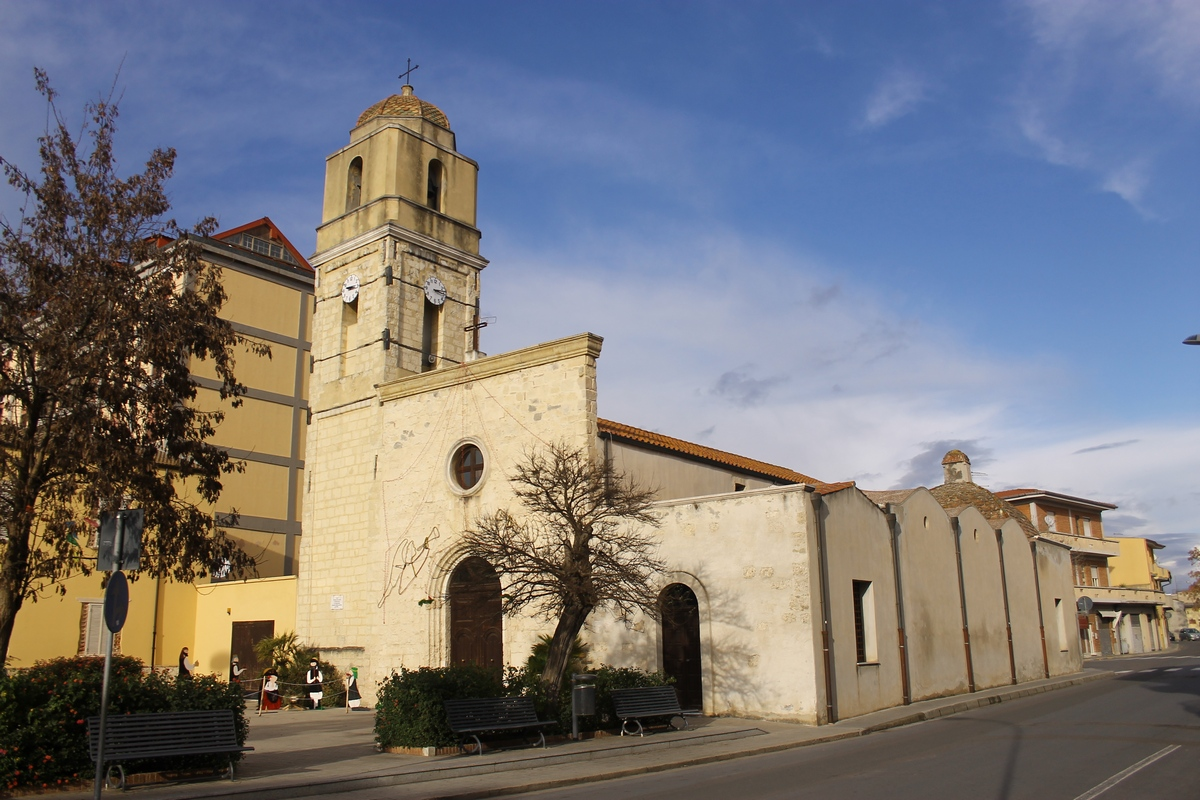
Church of Sant'Antonio Abate

Decimomannu was part of the Kingdom of Sardinia in the Spanish Empire until 1708, when, together with the whole Sardinia, came under Piedmontese rule in 1720.

On December 18, 2020, it was announced the institution of the International Flight Training School within the local military airport. It is a long-term collaboration between the Italian Air Force and Finmeccanica to train military pilots on modern flight simulators.

== Geography ==
Decimomannu borders the municipalities of Assemini, Decimoputzu, San Sperate, Siliqua, Uta, Villasor, and Villaspeciosa. It is served by a railway station connecting it to Iglesias, Golfo Aranci, and Cagliari.

=== Climate ===
The climate is hot-summer Mediterranean (Köppen: Csa), similar to the rest of the south-central coast of Italy.

Climate data for Decimomannu (Decimomannu Air Base), elevation: 28 m or 92 ft, 1991-2020 normals, 1991-2020 extremes
Month	Jan	Feb	Mar	Apr	May	Jun	Jul	Aug	Sep	Oct	Nov	Dec	Year
Record high °C (°F)	21.4 (70.5)	24.4 (75.9)	31.8 (89.2)	29.4 (84.9)	36.4 (97.5)	41.6 (106.9)	45.0 (113.0)	42.4 (108.3)	39.6 (103.3)	33.4 (92.1)	28.2 (82.8)	24.8 (76.6)	45.0 (113.0)
Mean daily maximum °C (°F)	14.7 (58.5)	15.1 (59.2)	17.7 (63.9)	20.7 (69.3)	25.1 (77.2)	30.0 (86.0)	33.3 (91.9)	33.7 (92.7)	29.0 (84.2)	24.9 (76.8)	19.3 (66.7)	15.8 (60.4)	23.3 (73.9)
Mean daily minimum °C (°F)	4.6 (40.3)	4.4 (39.9)	6.2 (43.2)	8.7 (47.7)	12.2 (54.0)	16.4 (61.5)	19.5 (67.1)	20.0 (68.0)	17.0 (62.6)	13.7 (56.7)	9.5 (49.1)	6.1 (43.0)	11.5 (52.8)
Record low °C (°F)	−4.0 (24.8)	−5.0 (23.0)	−2.2 (28.0)	−1.6 (29.1)	0.0 (32.0)	8.4 (47.1)	11.4 (52.5)	13.8 (56.8)	7.6 (45.7)	4.0 (39.2)	−1.4 (29.5)	−4.0 (24.8)	−5.0 (23.0)
Average precipitation mm (inches)	48.0 (1.89)	51.7 (2.04)	50.6 (1.99)	87.4 (3.44)	31.5 (1.24)	17.0 (0.67)	4.4 (0.17)	10.4 (0.41)	37.4 (1.47)	57.0 (2.24)	107.6 (4.24)	107.5 (4.23)	610.5 (24.03)
Average precipitation days (≥ 1.0 mm)	6.8	7.1	7.0	6.9	4.6	2.0	0.6	1.4	4.2	5.5	9.2	8.6	63.9
Average relative humidity (%)	77	74	72	69	66	63	61	62	66	71	76	78	70
Source: NOAA

== Demographics ==
Historical population

Year	Pop.	±%
1861	1,375	—
1871	1,455	+5.8%
1881	1,438	−1.2%
1901	1,446	+0.6%
1911	1,643	+13.6%
1921	1,685	+2.6%
1931	1,943	+15.3%
1936	2,144	+10.3%

Year	Pop.	±%
1951	3,181	+48.4%
1961	4,534	+42.5%
1971	4,823	+6.4%
1981	5,587	+15.8%
1991	6,332	+13.3%
2001	6,836	+8.0%
2011	7,831	+14.6%
2021	8,336	+6.4%

Source: ISTAT

== Main sights ==
- Church of Sant'Antonio Abate (16th century), in Gothic-Catalan style
- Church of Santa Greca, built in 1777 above a pre-existing one dating perhaps from around 1500.
- Roman Bridge, crossing the Rio Mannu river
