= Punic people =

People from Ancient Carthage

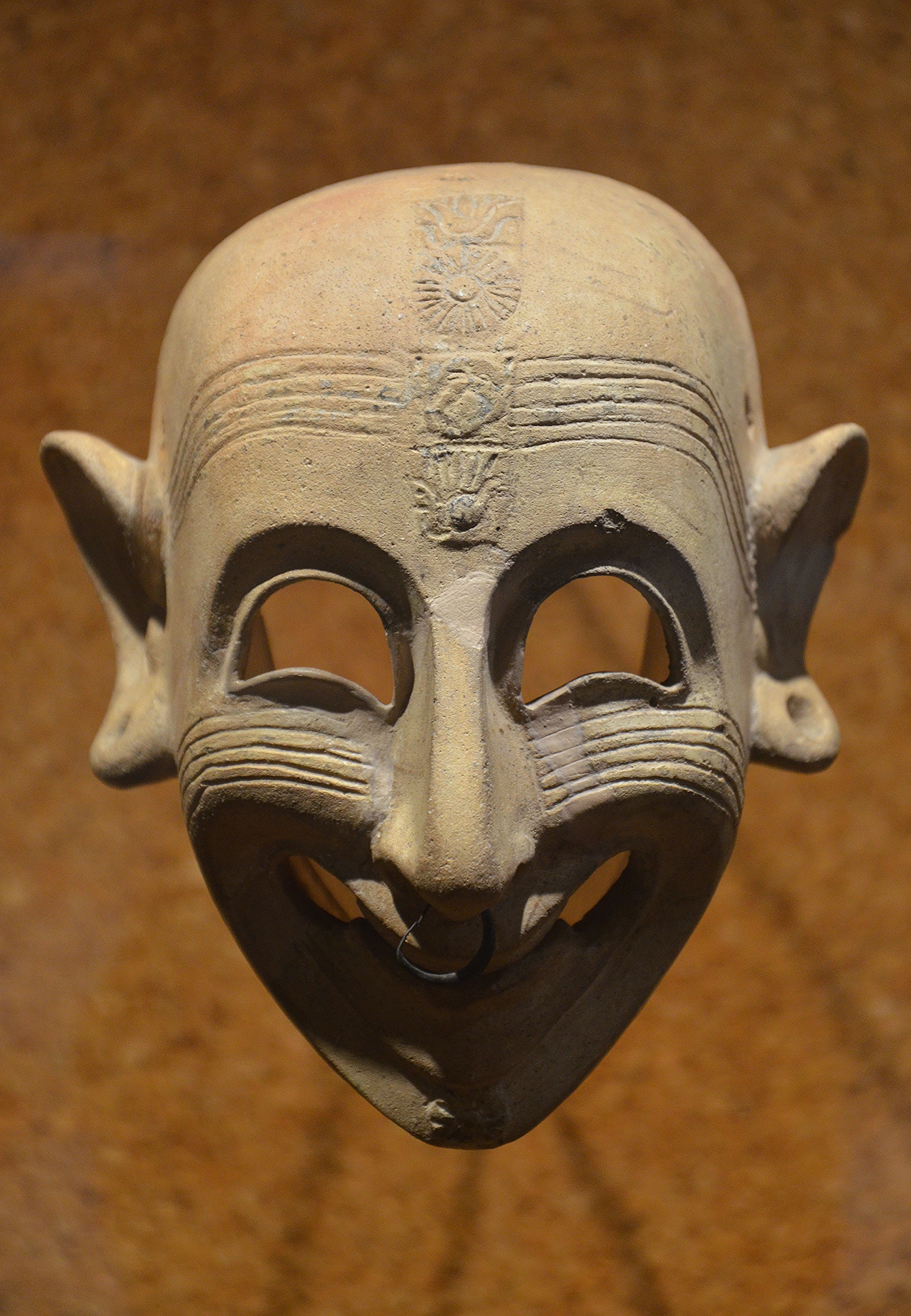
Phoenician grinning mask from Sardinia

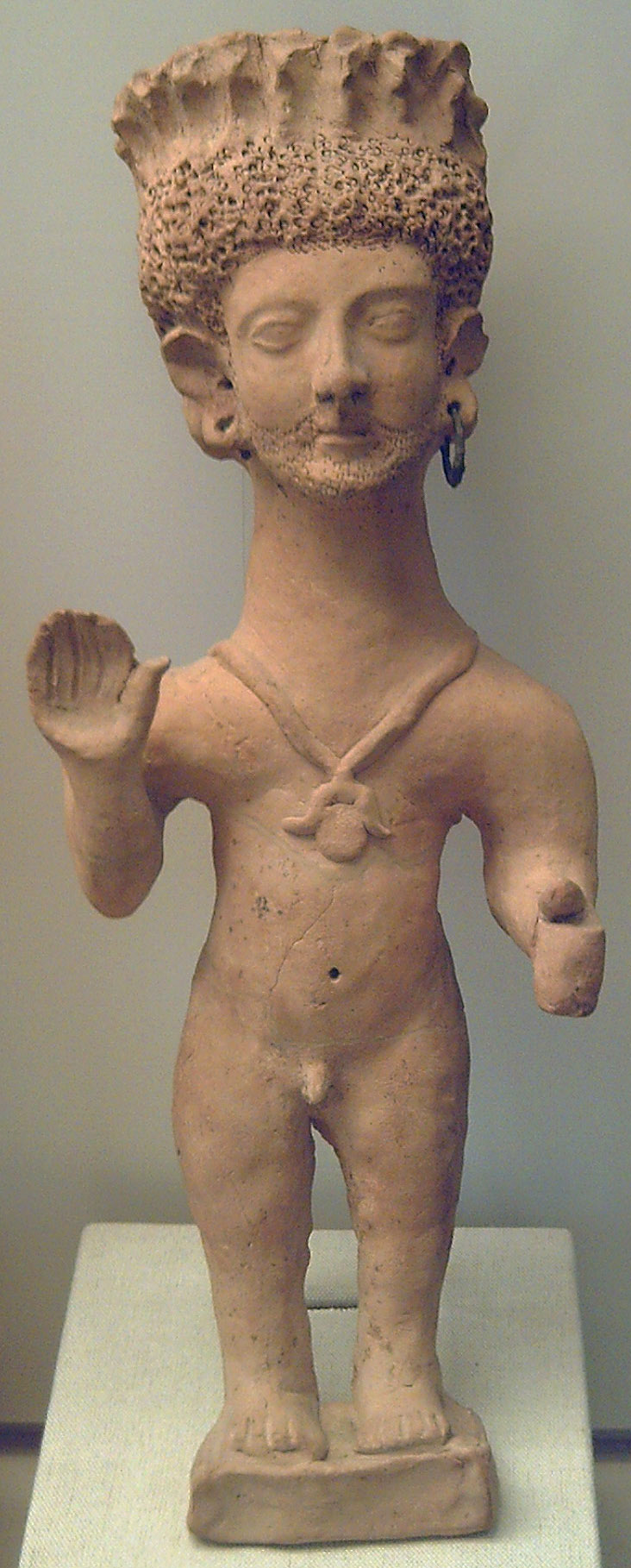
Punic praying statuette, c. 3rd century BC

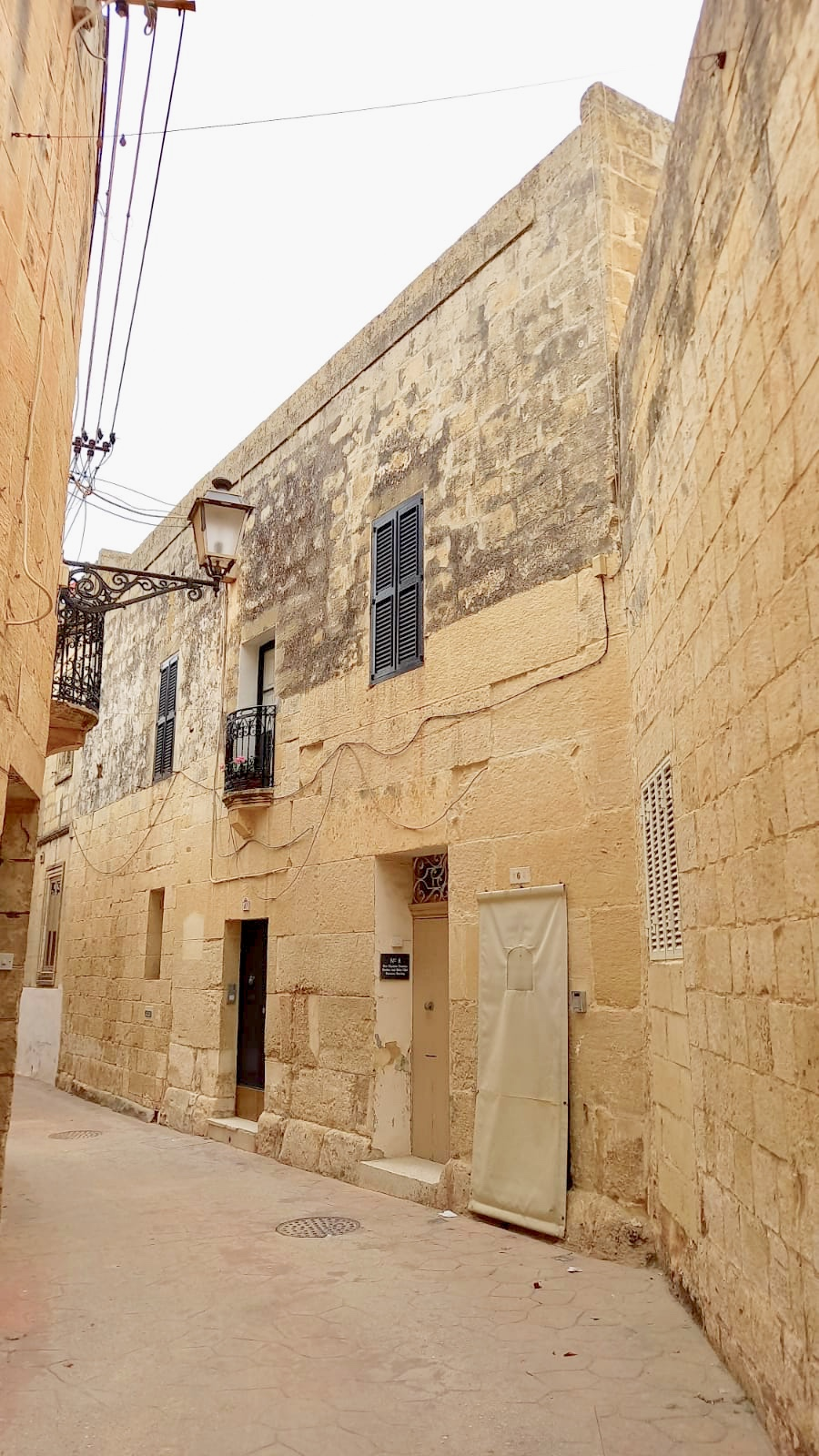
The Punic Building in Żurrieq, Malta, a modern structure incorporating Punic ruins

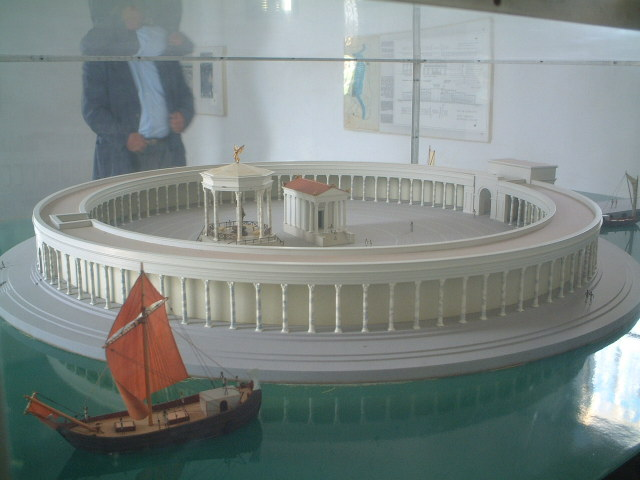
Model of the Punic military port, Carthage

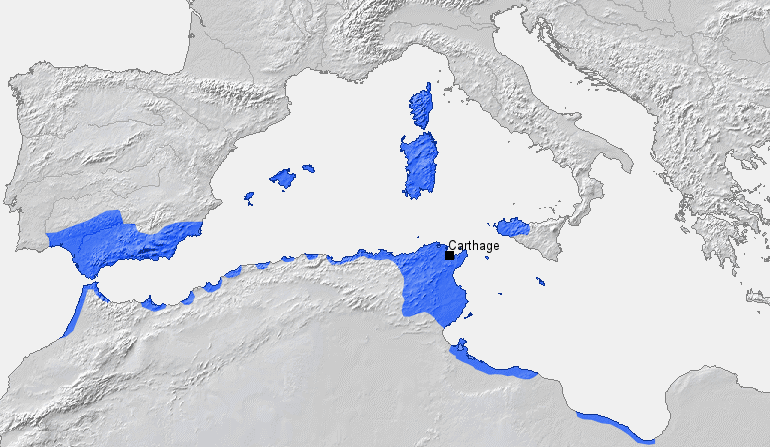
Carthaginian sphere of influence 264 BC

The Punic people, usually known as the Carthaginians (and sometimes as Western Phoenicians), were a Semitic people who migrated from Phoenicia to the western Mediterranean during the Early Iron Age. In modern scholarship, the term Punic, the Latin equivalent of the Greek-derived term Phoenician, is exclusively used to refer to Phoenicians in the western Mediterranean, following the line of the Greek East and Latin West. The largest Punic settlement was Ancient Carthage, but there were 300 other settlements along the North African coast from Leptis Magna in Libya to Mogador in Morocco, as well as western Sicily, southern Sardinia, the southern and eastern coasts of the Iberian Peninsula, Malta, and Ibiza. Their language, Punic, was a variety of Phoenician, one of the Northwest Semitic languages originating in the Levant.

Literary sources report two moments of Tyrian settlements in the west, the first in the 12th century BC (the cities Utica, Lixus, and Gadir) that hasn't been confirmed by archaeology, and a second at the end of the 9th century BC, documented in written references in both east and west, which culminated in the foundation of colonies in northwest Africa (the cities Auza, Carthage) and on the southern coast of Cyprus (Kition) and formed part of trading networks linked to Tyre, Arvad, Byblos, Berytus, Ekron, and Sidon in the Phoenician homeland. Although links with Phoenicia were retained throughout their history, they also developed close trading relations with other peoples of the western Mediterranean, such as Sicilians, Sardinians, Berbers, Greeks, and Iberians, and developed some cultural traits distinct from those of their Phoenician homeland. Some of these were shared by all western Phoenicians, while others were restricted to individual regions within the Punic sphere.

The western Phoenicians were arranged into a multitude of self-governing city-states. Carthage had grown to be the largest and most powerful of these city-states by the 5th century BC and gained increasingly close control over Punic Sicily and Sardinia in the 4th century BC, but communities in Iberia remained outside their control until the second half of the 3rd century BC. In the course of the Punic Wars (264–146 BC), the Romans challenged Carthaginian hegemony in the western Mediterranean, culminating in the destruction of Carthage in 146 BC, but the Punic language and Punic culture endured under Roman rule, surviving in some places until late antiquity.

== Terminology ==
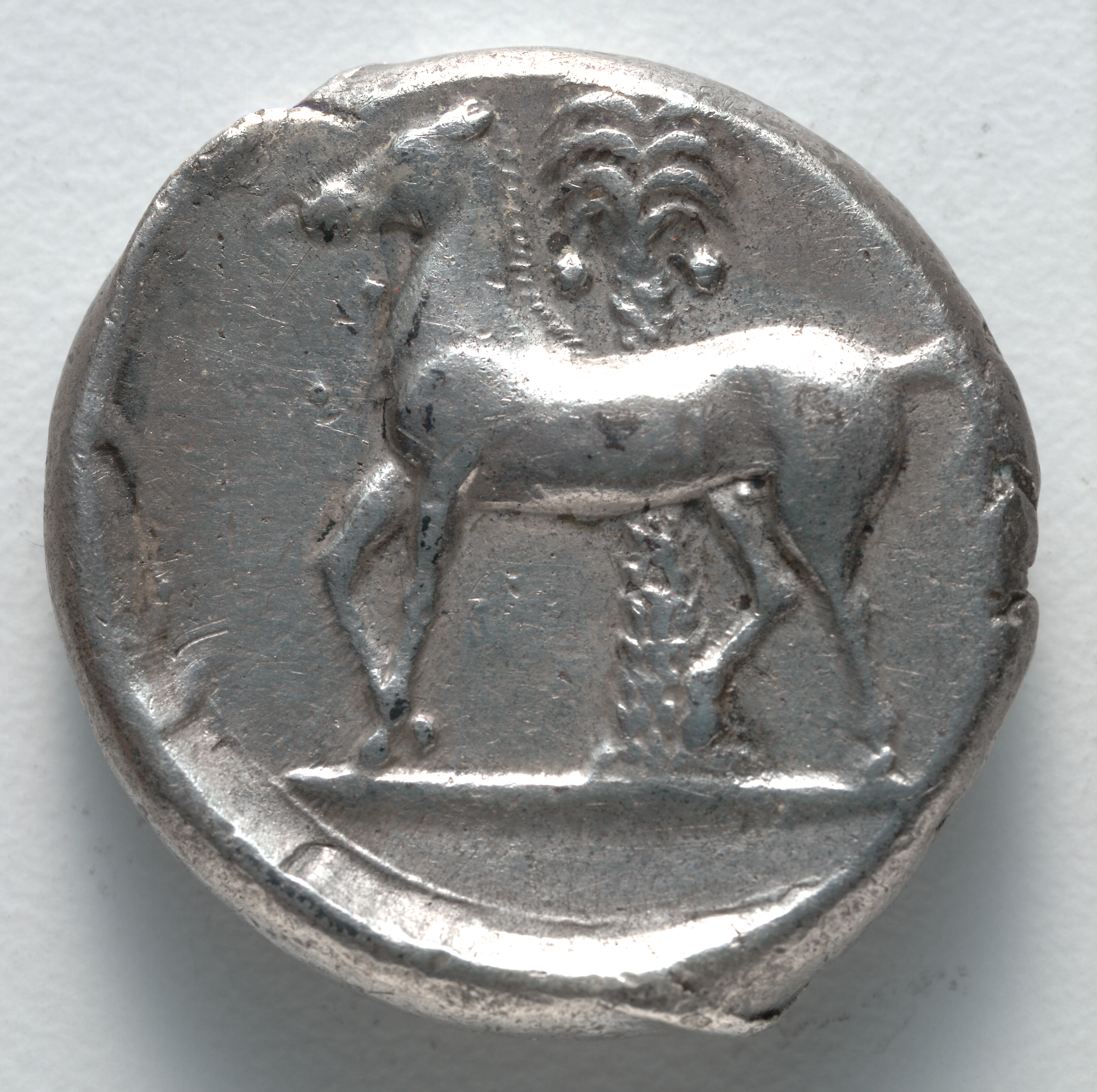
A Carthaginian coin from Sicily depicting a horse in front of a palm tree (called "Phoinix" in Greek), 4th century BC

The English adjective "Punic" is used in modern academic writing to refer to the western Phoenicians. The proper nouns "Punics" and "Punes" were used in the 16th century, but are obsolete and there is no proper noun in current use. "Punic" derives from the Latin poenus and punicus, which were used mostly to refer to the Carthaginians and other western Phoenicians. These terms derived from the Ancient Greek word Φοῖνιξ "Phoinix", plural Φοίνικες "Phoinikes", which was used indiscriminately to refer to both western and eastern Phoenicians. Latin later borrowed the Greek term a second time as "Phoenix", plural form "Phoenices", also used indiscriminately.

Numismatic evidence from Sicily shows that some western Phoenicians made use of the term "Phoinix", but it is not clear if they used that term for themselves; they may have called themselves 𐤊𐤍𐤏𐤍𐤌 (knʿnm, "Canaanites"). A passage from Augustine has often been interpreted as indicating that they called themselves Canaanites (Chanani in Latin), Augustine writes:

When our rural peasants are asked what they are, they reply, in Punic, "Chanani", which is only a corruption by one letter of the alphabet of what we would expect: What else should they reply except that they are "Chananei"?

It has been argued by J.C. Quinn that this is a misreading, since although this term is "applied to Levantine people" in the Hebrew Bible, "there is no other evidence for self-identification as Canaanite, and so we might suspect him of learned optimism."

However, this opinion is not shared by all scholars. Classicist Carolina López-Ruiz stresses that Phoenician identity existed as a recognizable collective, despite city-state fragmentation and limited internal literary sources. She argues against deconstructionist claims by "Phoenicoskeptics" that rely on "silence" in emic narratives. Archaeological, epigraphic, and external evidence (Greek, Roman and others) shows Phoenicians shared language, rituals, dress, occupations, commercial networks, and cultural practices. They used self-referents such as " Canaan/Canaanite", recognized ancestral bonds (e.g., Tyre refusing to attack Carthage as "sons"), and projected collective identity externally (e.g., palm tree/phoenix symbols on Carthaginian coins). Like the Greeks, they organized as independent city-states without a unified polity, yet this did not preclude a broader ethnic/cultural sense of kinship and shared heritage. External observers treated them as a distinct group, and internal evidence supports that they did the same.

In modern academic writing, the term Punic exclusively refers to Phoenicians in the western Mediterranean. Specific Punic groups are often referred to with hyphenated names, like Siculo-Punic or Sardo-Punic. (This practice has ancient roots: Hellenistic Greek authors sometimes referred to the Punic inhabitants of central northern Africa (Libya) as Liby-Phoenicians.)

== Overview ==
Like other Phoenician people, their urbanized culture and economy were strongly linked to the sea. They settled over Northwest Africa in what is now Algeria, Morocco, Tunisia and Libya and established some colonies in Southern Iberia, Sardinia, Sicily, Ebusus, Malta and other small islands of the western Mediterranean. In Sardinia and Sicily, they had strong economic and political ties to the independent natives in the hinterland. Their naval presence and trade extended throughout the Mediterranean and beyond, to Atlantic Iberia, the British Isles, the Canaries.

Technical achievements of the Punic people of Carthage include the development of uncolored glass and the use of limestone from lakeside deposits to improve the purity of smelted iron.

=== Religion ===
The Punic religion was a direct continuation of the Phoenician variety of the polytheistic ancient Canaanite religion. At Carthage, the chief gods were Baal Hammon (purportedly "Lord of the Brazier") and his consort Tanit, but other deities are attested, such as Eshmun, Melqart, Ashtart, Reshef, Sakon, and Shamash. The Carthaginians also adopted the Greek goddesses Demeter and Kore in 396 BC, as well as the Egyptian deities Bes, Bastet, Isis, Osiris, and Ra. Different Punic centres had their own distinct pantheons; in Punic Sardinia, for example, Sid or Sid Babi (known to the Romans as Sardus Pater and apparently an indigenous deity) received worship as the son of Melqart and was particularly associated with the island.

The Carthaginians appear to have had both part-time and full-time priests, the latter called khnm (singular khn, cognate with the Hebrew term kohen), led by high priests called rb khnm, as well as lower-ranking religious officials, called "servants" or "slaves" of the sanctuary (male: ˤbd, female: ˤbdt or mt), and functionaries like cooks, butchers, singers, and barbers. Sanctuaries had associations, referred to as mrzḥ in Punic and Neo-Punic inscriptions, who held ritual banquets. Some Phoenician communities practiced sacred prostitution; in the Punic sphere this is archeologically attested at Sicca Veneria (El Kef) in western Tunisia and the sanctuary of Venus Erycina at Eryx in western Sicily. Punic sacred prostitution is mentioned by Latin author Valerius Maximus, who describes how Carthaginian women gained gifts by engaging in prostitution with visitors at Sicca Veneria.

Various Greek and Roman sources describe and criticize the Carthaginian practice of sacrificing children by burning. Many ancient Greek and Latin authors describe some version of child sacrifice to "Cronos" (Baal Hammon). These descriptions were compared to those found in the Hebrew Bible describing the sacrifice of children by burning to Baal and Moloch at a place called Tophet. The ancient descriptions were seemingly confirmed by the discovering of the so-called Tophet of Salammbô in Carthage in 1921, which contained the urns of cremated children. However, modern historians and archaeologists debate the reality and extent of this practice. Some scholars propose that all remains at the tophet were sacrificed, whereas others propose that only some were.

== Distribution ==
=== Tunisia ===
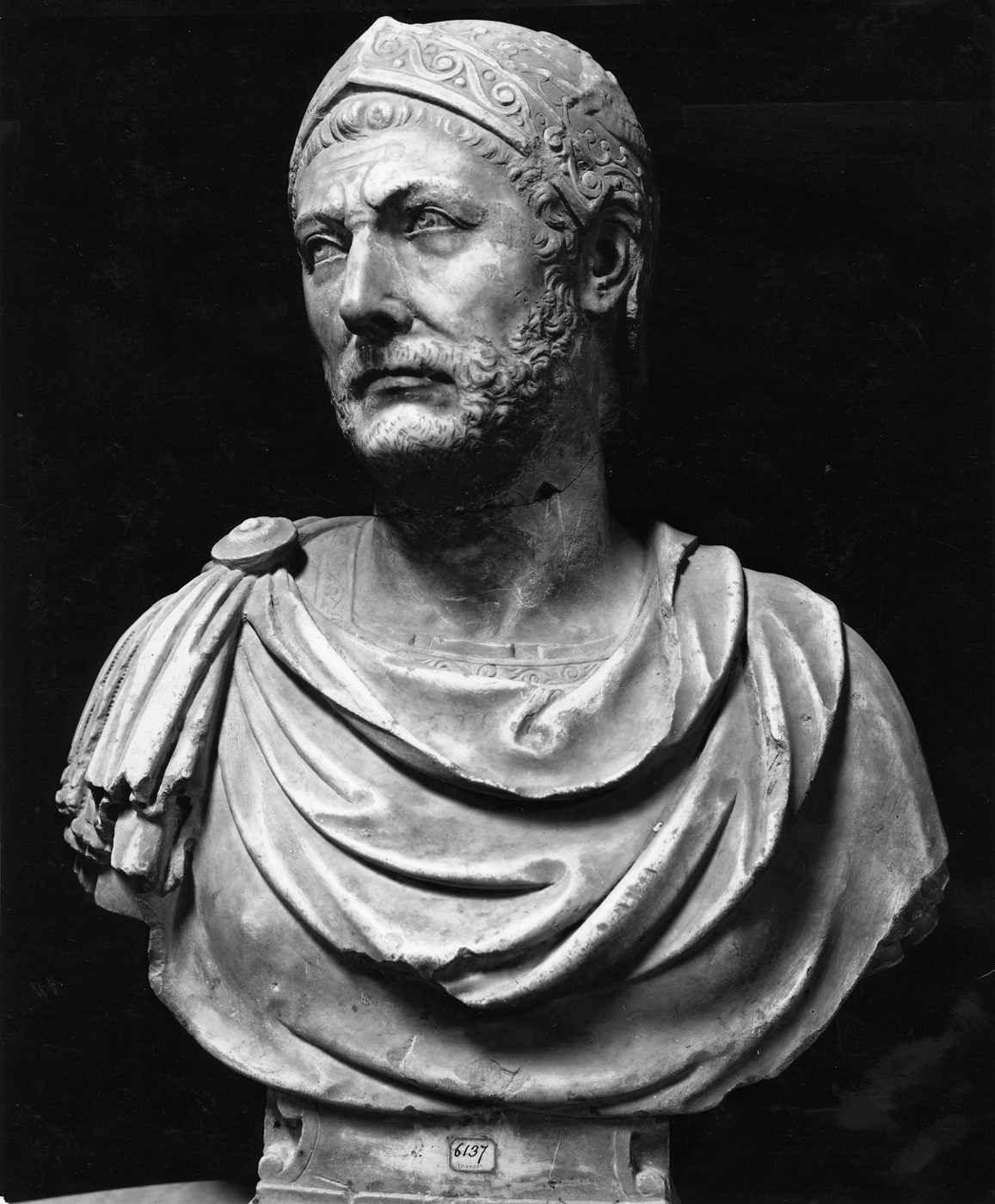
The Capuan bust, reputedly of Hannibal

Tunisia was among the areas settled during the first wave of Phoenician expansion into the west, with the foundation of Utica and Hippo Regius taking place around the end of the twelfth century. Further Phoenician settlements, were established in the following centuries, including Hippo Diarrhytus and Hadrumetum.

The foundation of Carthage on the site of modern Tunis is dated to the late 9th century BC by Greek literary sources and archaeological evidence. The literary sources attribute the foundation to a group of Tyrian refugees led by Dido and accompanied by Cypriots. Archaeologically, the new foundation is characterised by the focus of religious cult on the gods Tanit and Baal Hammon, by the development of a new religious structure, the tophet, and by a marked degree of cosmopolitanism.

Carthage gained direct control over the Cap Bon peninsula, operating a sandstone quarry at El Haouaria from the middle of the seventh city and establishing the city of Kerkouane in the early sixth century. The region was very fertile and allowed Carthage to be economically self-sufficient. The site of Kerkouane has been extensively excavated and provides the best-known example of a Punic city from North Africa.

Punic control also extended inland over the Libyans. Punic influence on inland regions is seen from the early 6th century, notably at Althiburos, where Punic construction techniques and red-slip pottery appear at the time. Armed conflicts with the Libyans are first attested in the early 5th century, with several revolts attested in the fourth century (398, 370s, 310-307 BC). In the late 4th century, Aristotle reports that the Carthaginians dealt with local discontent by resettling poor citizens in cities in Libya. These settlements had to provide tribute and military manpower when required, but remained self-governing. There is some evidence for intermarriage between Punic people and Libyans.

=== Sardo-Punics ===
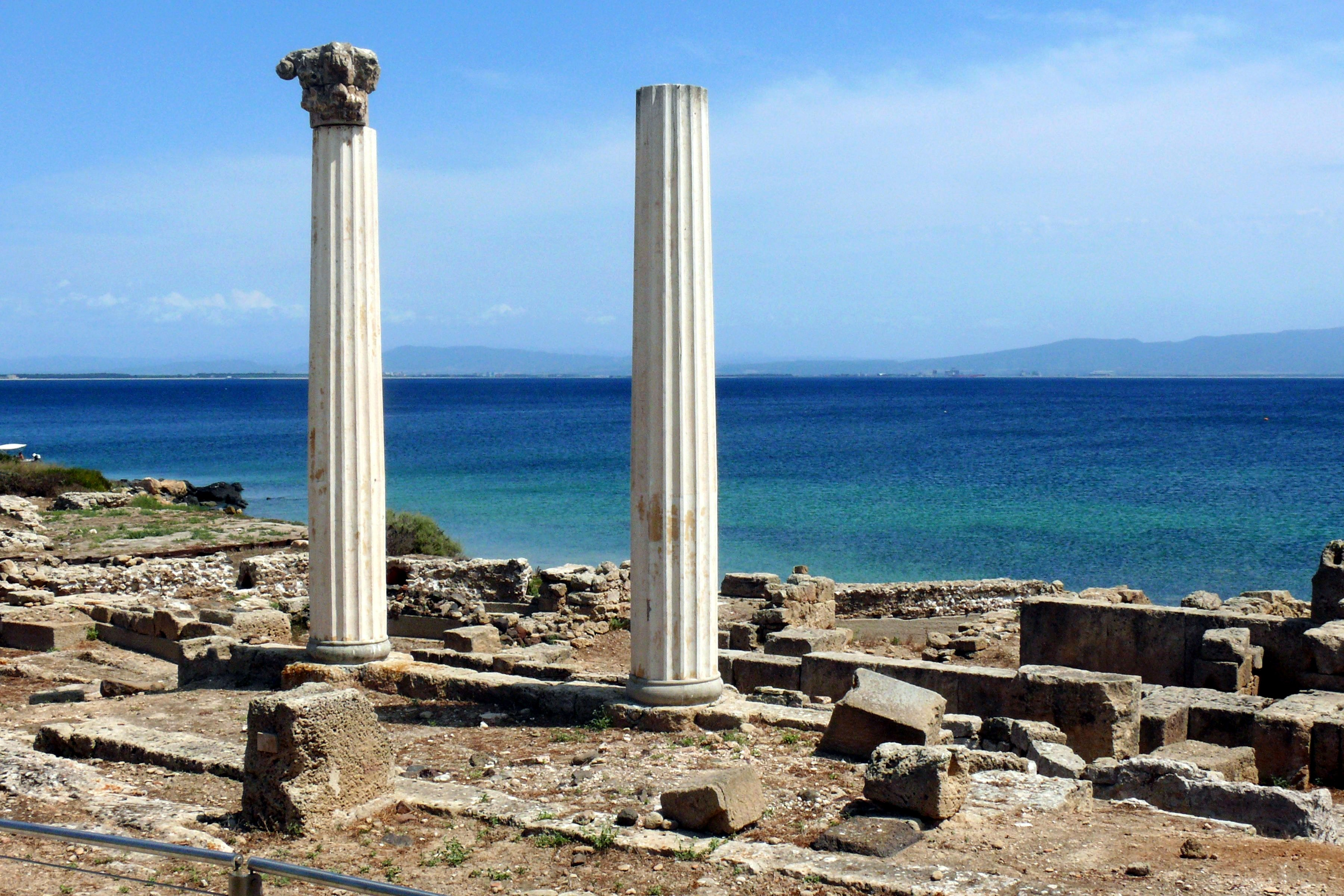
Ruins of the Punic and then Roman town of Tharros

From the 8th century BC, Phoenicians founded several cities and strongholds on strategic points in the south and west of Sardinia, often peninsulas or islands near estuaries, easy to defend and natural harbours, such as Tharros, Bithia, Sulci, Nora and Caralis (Cagliari). The north, the eastern coast and the interior of the island continued to be dominated by the indigenous Nuragic civilization, whose relations with the Sardo-Punic cities were mixed, including both trade and military conflict. Intermarriage and cultural mixing took place on a large scale. The inhabitants of the Sardo-Punic cities were a mixture of Phoenician and Nuragic stock, with the latter forming the majority of the population. Sardinia had a special position because it was central in the western Mediterranean between Carthage, Spain, the river Rhône, and Etruria. Iglesiente was an important mining area for the metals lead and zinc.

The island came under Carthaginian dominance around 510 BC, after that a first attempt at conquest in 540 BC that ended in failure. They expanded their influence to the western and southern coast from Bosa to Caralis, consolidating the existing Phoenician settlements, administered by plenipotentiaries called Suffetes, and founding new ones such as Olbia, Cornus, and Neapolis; Tharros was probably the main centre. Carthage encouraged the cultivation of grain and cereals and prohibited fruit trees. Tharros, Nora, Bithia, Monte Sirai etc. are now important archaeological sites where Punic architecture and city planning can be studied.

In 238 BC, following the First Punic War the Romans took over the whole island, incorporating it into the province of Corsica et Sardinia, under a praetor. The existing power structures, infrastructure, and urbanized culture continued largely unchanged. In 216 BC, two Sardo-Punic notables from Cornus and Tharros, Hampsicora and Hanno, led a revolt against the Romans. Punic culture remained strong during the first centuries of the Roman domination, but over time the civic elites adopted Roman cultural practices and Latin became first the prestige language, and later the speech of the majority of the inhabitants.

=== Ibiza ===
The island of Ibiza derives its name from Phoenician: 𐤀𐤁𐤔𐤌, ʾbšm, "Dedicated to Bes". (Latin Ebusus). A city, the Sa Caleta Phoenician Settlement, which has been excavated, was established in the mid-seventh century. Diodorus dates this foundation to 654 BC and attributes it to the Carthaginians.

=== Sicily ===
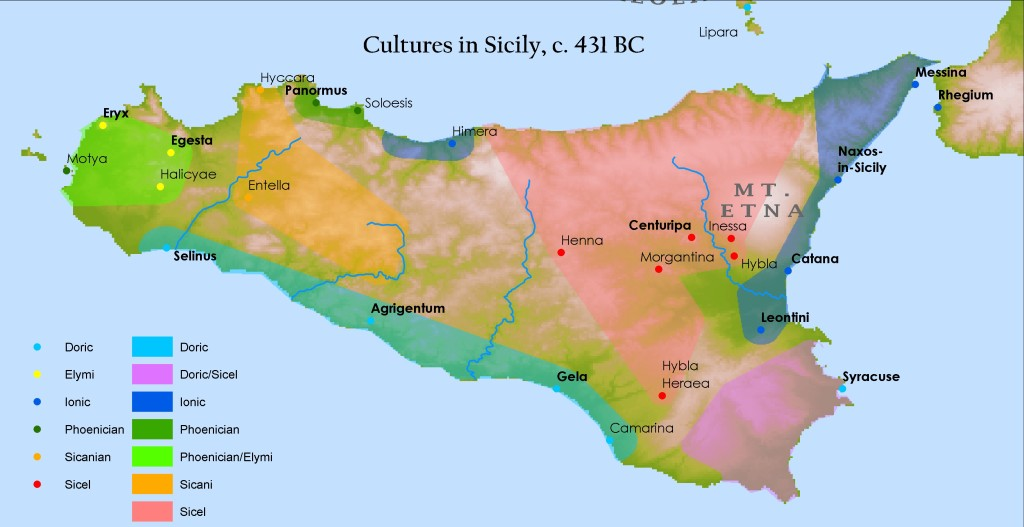
Sicily at the beginning of the Peloponnesian War

From the 11th century BC, Phoenician merchants, sailors, and artisans begin to settle in western Sicily, having already started colonies on the nearby parts of North Africa. Within a century, they established major Phoenician settlements at Soloeis (Solunto), present day Palermo and Motya (an island near present-day Marsala). Others included Drepana (Trapani) and Mazara del Vallo.

As Carthage later grew in power, these settlements sometimes came into conflict with them, such as Motya, and Phoenician city-states in western Sicily were eventually fully integrated into Carthage by the 6th century BC.

The Phoenicians integrated with the local Elymian population as shown in archaeology as a distinctive "West Phoenician cultural identity".

== History ==
=== Origins ===
Map of Phoenicia, trade routes and the Phoenician colony of Carthage

It is unclear when the Phoenicians began to seriously colonize North Africa. Writers in antiquity, such as Pliny the Elder, dated the beginning of the colonization efforts to the 12th and 11th centuries BC, as several legends describe interactions between Phoenician colonists and famous figures from the Trojan War, such as Aeneas. Archaeological evidence, on the other hand, generally implies that the colonies began in the 8th century BC as, barring a few exceptional sites, any material evidence of Phoenician habitation before this time period is lacking.

The Phoenician colonial system was motivated by economic opportunity, not expansionist ideology, and as such, the Phoenicians lacked the numbers or even the desire to establish an "empire" overseas. The colonies were therefore independent city-states, though most were relatively small, probably having a population of less than 1,000. Some colonies, such as Carthage, were able to grow much larger. Effectively establishing a monopoly on the continent's natural resources, the colonies' wealth exploded, which was compounded by an influx of Phoenician traders fleeing from increasing tributary obligations to foreign powers and trade interference.

Within a century, the population of Carthage rose to 30,000, meanwhile, the "mother city" of Tyre, once the economic and political capital of Phoenicia, began to lose its status in the seventh century BC. Phoenicia was eventually conquered by the Neo-Assyrian Empire, by which point Carthage had become the wealthiest and most powerful of all the Phoenician colonies. Around this time, a distinct culture began to emerge from the admixture of local customs with Phoenician traditions, which also gave rise to a nascent sense of national identity. Tyre's status and power continued to diminish under Neo-Assyrian, and subsequently Neo-Babylonian, vassalage, and by the sixth century BC, its voluntary submission to the Achaemenid Empire had severely circumscribed what little power it retained. Its status as the pre-eminent Phoenician city was then usurped by its rival city-state, Sidon – but Sidon too was under Persian subjugation, leading the way for Carthage to fill the power vacuum as the leading Phoenician political power.

=== 650–146 BC ===
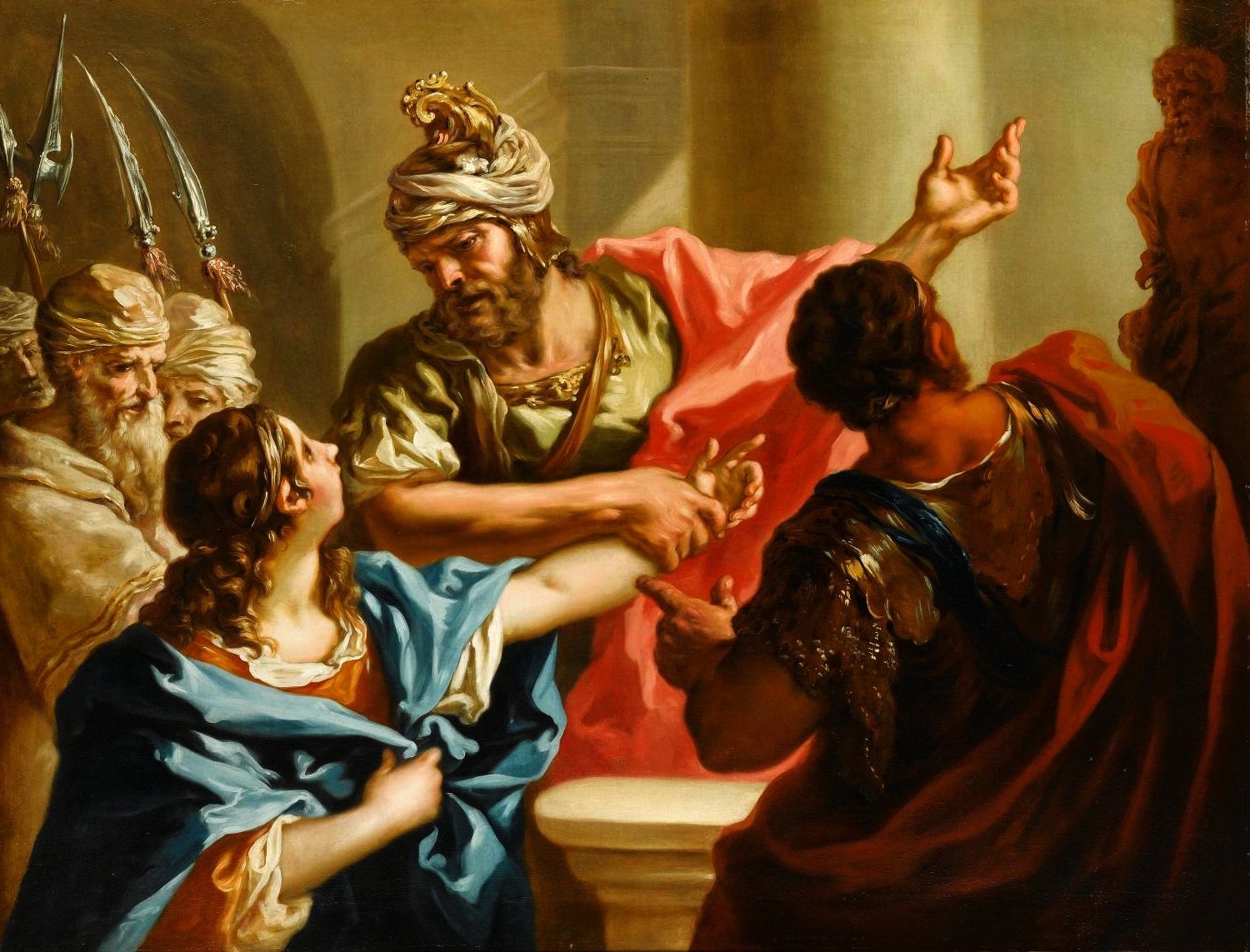
Young Hannibal Swears Enmity to Rome by Giovanni Antonio Pellegrini (1731)

With Phoenicia's decline, Carthage had become effectively independent from Tyre by 650 BC. Carthaginians carried out significant sea explorations around Africa and elsewhere from their base in Carthage. In the 5th century BC, Hanno the Navigator played a significant role in exploring coastal areas of present-day Morocco and other parts of the African coast, specifically noting details of indigenous peoples, such as at Essaouira. Carthaginians pushed westerly into the Atlantic and established important settlements in Lixus, Volubilis, Chellah, and Mogador, among other locations.

Being trade rivals with Magna Graecia, the Carthaginians had several clashes with the Greeks over the island of Sicily in the Sicilian Wars from 600 to 265 BC. The Carthaginians eventually also fought Rome in three Punic Wars between 265 and 146 BC but they were defeated in each one. In the First Punic War, they lost control of Sicily. In the Second Punic War, an invasion of Italy by Hannibal was unsuccessful in forcing the Romans to surrender and the Carthaginians were subsequently defeated by Scipio Africanus in Spain and at the Battle of Zama in northern Africa in 202 BC, marking the end of Carthage's position as a major Mediterranean power. Finally, in the Third Punic War, Carthage was destroyed in 146 BC. Victory in the Punic Wars enabled Roman settlement of Africa and eventual domination of the entire Mediterranean Sea.

=== 146 BC–700 AD ===
The destruction of Carthage did not mean the end of the Punic people. After the wars, the city of Carthage was completely razed and the land around it was turned into farmland for Roman citizens. There were, however, other Punic cities in northwest Africa, and Carthage itself was rebuilt and regained some importance, if a shadow of its ancient influence. Although the area was partially romanized and some of the population adopted the Roman religion, while fusing it with aspects of their beliefs and customs, the language and the ethnicity persisted for some time.

The cult to Baal Hammon, and the consequent sacrifice of children, though banned by Rome, continued openly under the guise of worshipping Saturn until at least the proconsulate of Tiberius Iulius Secundus in Africa (131–132). This is attested by Tertullian in his Apologeticus, where he reports that Tiberius crucified the priests of "Saturn" on the same trees they consecrated to the god. Tertullian also mentions the goddess Juno Caelestis as a romanization of Tanit.

Carthage was rebuilt about 46 BC by Julius Caesar, and settlements in the surrounding area were granted to soldiers who had retired from the Roman army. People of Punic origin prospered again as traders, merchants and even politicians of the Roman Empire. The emperor Septimius Severus had Punic ancestry.

As Christianity spread in the Roman Empire, it was especially successful in northwest Africa, and Carthage became a Christian city even before Christianity was legal. Saint Augustine, born in Thagaste (modern-day Algeria), considered himself Punic, and left some important reflections on Punic cultural history in his writing. One of his more well known passages reads:

It is an excellent thing that the Punic Christians call baptism itself nothing else but 'salvation', and the sacrament of Christ's body nothing else but 'life'.

Augustine is the last ancient writer to indicate that the Punic language was widely spoken. The last remains of a distinct Punic culture probably disappeared somewhere in the chaos during the fall of the Western Roman Empire. The demographic and cultural characteristics of the region were thoroughly transformed by turbulent events such as the Vandals' wars with Byzantines and the population movements that followed, as well as the Muslim conquest of North Africa in the 7th century AD. After the Muslim conquest of the Maghreb, the geographer al-Bakri described a people who spoke a language which was not Berber, Latin, or Coptic, living in Sirte, where spoken Punic survived well past written use. Whether this refers to some remnant Punic population is uncertain; if it does, it represents the last known record of the people's existence.

== Genetics ==
=== mtDNA ===
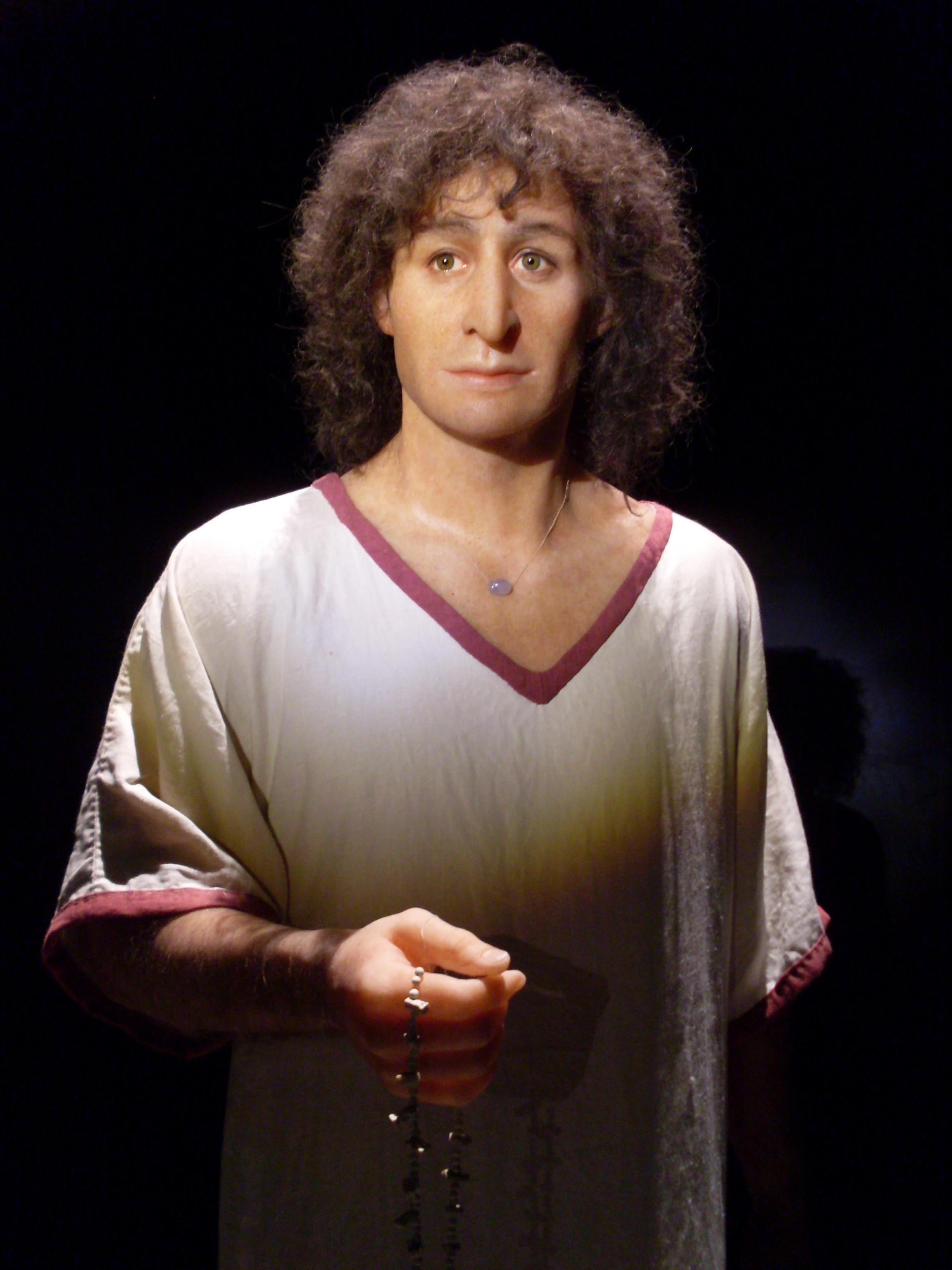
Reconstruction of the Young Man of Byrsa

In 1994, a Punic burial crypt was discovered on Byrsa Hill, near the entry to the National Museum of Carthage in Tunisia. Inside this crypt were the remains of a young man along with a range of burial goods, all dating to the late 6th century BCE. An osteological analysis of the young man from Byrsa, or Ariche, as he has become known, determined that he was approximately 1.7 m tall and aged between 19 and 24 years, and a craniometric analysis indicated likely Mediterranean/European ancestry as opposed to African or Asian. In 2016, it was revealed that the individual belonged to the rare U5b2c1 (found in Spain), which is the earliest evidence of this European lineage in North Africa.

Sarno et al. (2021) analysed ancient Punic individuals from the necropolis of Tharros in Sardinia (5th – 3rd century BC). The study demonstrates that Punic-related individuals from Tharros fall in an intermediate position between modern Southern European Iberians and North African populations, while present-day Sardinians form a clade with pre-Phoenician Sardinian populations dated between the Neolithic and the Nuragic periods. The results shows that female mobility from Iberia and North Africa to Sardinia was associated with Punic communities.

A 2022 analysis of maternal haplogroups from ancient samples from Punic sites of Motya and Lilibeo in Sicily, indicates that the Sicilian Phoenicians shared genetic similarities with Bronze Age samples from the Iberian Peninsula, Sardinia and Italy, and were not particularly close to other Phoenicians from Sardinia and the Iberian islands. The Phoenicians in Motya shared lesser genetic similarities with samples from Bronze Age Levant.

=== Y-DNA ===
A recent genetic study has linked haplogroups E-M81, E-FGC18960 and E-V65 to the diffusion of the Phoenician language in the Western Mediterranean. According to Penninx (2019):

"When the Phoenicians migrated over the Mediterranean to the west and established their the city of Carthage, they had people with Y-DNA E-M81, and some people with E-FGC18960 and E-V65.".

=== auDNA ===
Recent genetic studies based on ancient DNA have shown that the Punic populations of Sardinia, Ibiza, southern Iberia, Italy, and Tunisia had predominantly Southern European ancestry — notably linked to Aegean, Italic, and Sicilian regions — combined with a significant but minor North African component. In contrast, Levantine genetic ancestry, historically associated with the Phoenician founders of Carthage, appears marginal, suggesting that local assimilation and early Mediterranean admixture played a greater role than large-scale migration from the Levant.

Zalloua, P., Collins, C.J., Gosling, A. et al. in 2018 showed that Eastern Mediterranean and North African influence in the Punic population of Ibiza was primarily male dominated.

According to Olalde et al. (2018):

"In the southeast [Spain], we recovered genomic data from 45 individuals dated between the 3rd and 16th centuries CE. All analyzed individuals fell outside the genetic variation of preceding Iberian Iron Age populations and harbored ancestry from both Southern European and North African populations, as well as additional Levantine-related ancestry that could potentially reflect ancestry from Jewish groups. These results demonstrate that by the Roman period, southern Iberia had experienced a major influx of North African ancestry, probably related to the well-known mobility patterns during the Roman Empire or to the earlier Phoenician-Punic presence; the latter is also supported by the observation of the Phoenician-associated Y-chromosome J2."

According to Fernandes et al. (2020):

"Phoenician colonies were established in the Balearic Islands during the Iron Age. The Ibiza individual published previously from a collective burial in a Punic hypogeum and dated to 361–178 cal. BC is not consistent with forming a clade with any of the Bronze Age Balearic individuals and has a qualitatively different ancestry profile; for example, a north African source of ancestry is required to obtain a fit (our model is 10.8 ± 2.7% Iran_Ganj_Dareh_Neolithic and 89.2 ± 2.7% Morocco_LN ancestry)."

According to Marcus et al. (2020):

"All six individuals from the Punic Villamar site were inferred to have substantial levels of ancient north African ancestry (point estimates ranging 20–35%) ... Beyond our focal interest in Sardinia, the results from individuals from the Phoenician-Punic sites Monte Sirai and Villamar shed some light on the ancestry of a historically impactful Mediterranean population. Notably, they show strong genetic relationships to ancient North-African and eastern Mediterranean sources.
These results mirror other emerging ancient DNA studies and are not unexpected given that the Punic center of Carthage, on the north African coast itself, has roots in the eastern Mediterranean. Interestingly, the Monte Sirai individuals, predating the Villamar individuals by several centuries, show less north African ancestry. This could be because they harbor earlier Phoenician ancestry and north African admixture may have been unique to the later Punic context, or because they were individuals from a different ancestral background altogether. Estimated north African admixture fractions were much lower in later ancient individuals and present-day Sardinian individuals, in line with previous studies that have observed small but significant African admixture in several present-day south European populations, including Sardinia."

Two other studies also show a certain degree of similarity of several individuals from the suburbs of Imperial Rome (1st–3rd cent. CE) with North African and Middle Eastern populations. Archaeological and isotopic evidences indicate that these individuals were primarily slaves and freedmen.

Accorging to De Angelis et al. (2021) published in Annals of Human Biology:

"The genomic legacy with the south-eastern shores of the Mediterranean Sea and the Central and Western Northern-African coast funerary influence pave the way for considering people buried in QCP [Quarto Cappello del Prete, Italy] as resembling a Punic-derived human group."

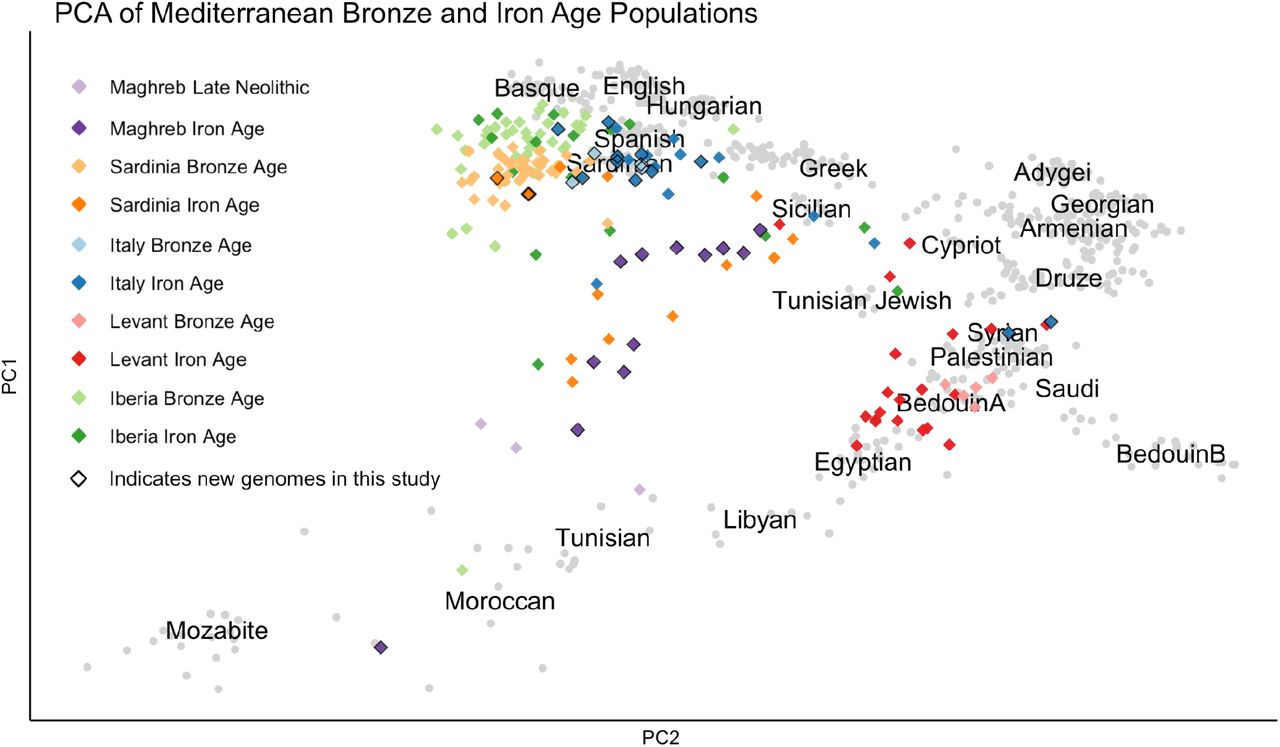
aDNA of ancient Mediterranean (incl. 30 Punic) samples clustering with contemporary populations

In 2022, 30 ancient individuals from Carthaginian and Etruscan port cities around the central Mediterranean, in Tunisia, Sardinia, and central Italy were sequenced. In Tunisia a highly heterogeneous population was observed in Kerkouane, spanning from modern Mozabite populations to modern Sicilian populations, consisting of three primary genetic clusters. One of the genetic groups includes four individuals who have genetic continuity with preceding Maghrebi Neolithic farmers, suggesting that these individuals represent an autochthonous North African population. One individual can be modeled with 100% Morocco Late Neolithic farmer ancestry, while three individuals can be modeled predominantly with this component, along with the addition of Steppe-related ancestry. A second cluster contains seven individuals who are genetically similar to Bronze Age Sicilian and central Italian populations, as well as some individuals from the Hellenistic Iberian Greek colony of Empúries. A last individual, who projects near modern Mozabite and Moroccan populations in PCA space can be modelled with a combination Morocco Early Neolithic and Anatolia Neolithic ancestry. When compared to other ancient individuals, this individual forms a clade with ancient Canary Island inhabitants thought to be representative of the original founding population. Surprisingly, no individuals with large amounts of Levantine ancestry were detected in this group of Tunisian Punics. One possible explanation is that the colonial expansion of Phoenician city-states at the start of the Iron Age did not involve large amounts of population mobility, and may have been based on trade relationships rather than occupation. According to the authors:

"These results indicate that autochthonous North African populations contributed substantially to the genetic makeup of Kerkouane. The contribution of autochthonous North African populations in Carthaginian history is obscured by the use of terms like "Western Phoenicians", and even to an extent, "Punic", in the literature to refer to Carthaginians, as it implies a primarily colonial population and diminishes indigenous involvement in the Carthaginian Empire. As a result, the role of autochthonous populations has been largely overlooked in studies of Carthage and its empire. Genetic approaches are well suited to examine such assumptions, and here we show that North African populations contributed substantially to the genetic makeup of Carthaginian cities."

A genetic study published in April 2025 by an international team of researchers from the Max Planck Institute for Evolutionary Anthropology and Harvard University has offered new insight into the origins of the Carthaginians. By analyzing ancient DNA from about 200 individuals across 14 archaeological sites around the Mediterranean (including North Africa, the Iberian Peninsula, Sicily, Sardinia, and the Levant), the researchers found that Punic populations were genetically diverse, with little to no direct ancestry from the Levant—traditionally considered the homeland of the Phoenicians.

Instead, according to the authors "these inheritors of Levantine Phoenician culture derived most of their ancestry from a genetic profile similar to that of populations in Sicily and the Aegean. Much of the remaining ancestry originated from North Africa, reflecting the growing regional influence of Carthage". In Carthage itself, "in 14 out of the 17 sampled individuals, we inferred less than 15% North African ancestry, and the remaining three individuals were inferred to have 20%–50% North African ancestry. As in Kerkouane, the primary source of ancestry is Sicilian-Aegean".

These findings suggest that Phoenician expansion occurred primarily through cultural exchange, maritime networks, and local assimilation, rather than through large-scale migration. Carthage likely developed as a cosmopolitan center within a dynamic Mediterranean world, shaped by continuous interactions between indigenous populations and eastern influences.

== Notable Punic people ==
- Hannibal, Carthaginian general
- Hanno the Navigator, Carthaginian navigator and explorer
- Hamilcar Barca, Carthaginian general, father of Hannibal
- Hasdrubal Barca, Carthaginian admiral, brother of Hannibal
- Hampsicora, Sardinian rebel
- Hasdrubal the Boetharch, the main Carthaginian leader during the Third Punic War
- Himilco, Carthaginian navigator and explorer
- Mago, agricultural writer

== See also ==
- History of Tunisia
- Carthaginian coinage
- Poenulus ("The Puny Punic") – a comedy by Plautus, shows the vision the Romans had of Carthaginians. A number of lines are in the Punic language.
- Punica – the genus of pomegranates, known to Romans as mala punica ("the Punic apple")
- Phoenician–Punic literature

== Bibliography ==
- Casula, Francesco Cesare (1994). La storia di Sardegna. Sassari: Delfino Editore. ISBN 88-7138-063-0.
- Davis, Nathan (1985). Carthage and Her Remains. London, UK: Draf Publishers. ISBN 978-1-85077-033-6.
- Dorey, Thomas Alan; Dudley, D. R. (1971). Rome Against Carthage. New York, NY: Vintage. ISBN 978-0-436-13130-1.
- Dridi, Hédi (2019). "Early Carthage: From its foundation to the battle of Himera (ca. 814–480 BC)". In Doak, Brian R.; López-Ruiz, Carolina (eds.). The Oxford Handbook of the Phoenician and Punic Mediterranean. Oxford University Press. pp. 141–152. ISBN 978-0-19-049934-1.
- Fantar, Mhamed Hassine (2001). "Le fait religieux à Carthage". Pallas (56): 59–66. ISSN 0031-0387.
- Head, Barclay V. (1911). Historia Numorum: A Manual of Greek Numismatics. Oxford: Clarendon Press.
- Holm, Tawny L. (2005). "Phoenician Religion [Further Considerations]". In Jones, Lindsay (ed.). Encyclopedia of Religion. Vol. 10 (2 ed.). Macmillan Reference. pp. 7134–7135.
- Hoyos, Dexter (2021). Carthage: A Biography. London and New York: Routledge. ISBN 978-1-003-11968-5.
- Hoyos, Dexter (2019). Carthage's Other Wars: Carthaginian Warfare Outside the 'Punic Wars' Against Rome. Pen & Sword Military. ISBN 978-1-78159-357-8.
- Miles, Richard (2010). Carthage must be destroyed: the rise and fall of an ancient Mediterranean civilization. London: A. Lane. ISBN 978-0-7139-9793-4.
- Quinn, Josephine C. (2011). "Cultural Identity in the Ancient Mediterranean". In Gruen, Erich S. (ed.). Cultural Identity in the Ancient Mediterranean. Los Angeles: Getty Research Institute. pp. 388–413. ISBN 978-0-89236-969-0.
- Schwartz, J.H.; Houghton, F.D.; Bondioli, L.; Macchiarelli, R. (April 2017). "Two tales of one city: data, inference and Carthaginian infant sacrifice". Antiquity. 91 (356): 442–454. doi:10.15184/aqy.2016.270.
- Stager, Lawrence E.; Wolff, Sam (1984). "Child Sacrifice at Carthage - Religious Rite or Population Control ?". Biblical Archaeology Review.
- Warmington, B. H. (1969). Carthage (2d ed.). Praeger.
- Zucca, Raimondo (2006). "La Sardegna e le Grandi Civilità Mediterranee". In Brigaglia, Manlio; Mastino, Attilio; Ortu, Gian Giacomo (eds.). Storia della Sardegna. 1: Dalle origini al Settecento (in Italian). Rome: Editori Laterza. pp. 21–32. ISBN 978-88-420-7839-5.
