= Sardegna and Corsica =

Sardegna and Corsica may refer to:

- Kingdom of Sardinia, a country in Southern Europe from the late 13th until the mid-19th century
- Sardinia and Corsica, an ancient Roman province including the islands of Sardinia and Corsica
