= 215 BC =

215 BC in various calendars
| Gregorian calendar | 215 BC; CCXV BC |
| Ab urbe condita | 539 |
| Ancient Egypt era | XXXIII dynasty, 109 |
| Pharaoh | Ptolemy IV Philopator, 7 |
| Ancient Greek Olympiad (summer) | 141st Olympiad, year 2 |
| Assyrian calendar | 4536 |
| Balinese saka calendar | N/A |
| Bengali calendar | −808 – −807 |
| Berber calendar | 736 |
| Buddhist calendar | 330 |
| Burmese calendar | −852 |
| Byzantine calendar | 5294–5295 |
| Chinese calendar | 乙酉年 (Wood Rooster); 2483 or 2276 — to — 丙戌年 (Fire Dog); 2484 or 2277 |
| Coptic calendar | −498 – −497 |
| Discordian calendar | 952 |
| Ethiopian calendar | −222 – −221 |
| Hebrew calendar | 3546–3547 |
- Hindu calendars
| Vikram Samvat | −158 – −157 |
| Shaka Samvat | N/A |
| Kali Yuga | 2886–2887 |
| Holocene calendar | 9786 |
| Iranian calendar | 836 BP – 835 BP |
| Islamic calendar | 862 BH – 861 BH |
| Javanese calendar | N/A |
| Julian calendar | N/A |
| Korean calendar | 2119 |
| Minguo calendar | 2126 before ROC 民前2126年 |
| Nanakshahi calendar | −1682 |
| Seleucid era | 97/98 AG |
| Thai solar calendar | 328–329 |
| Tibetan calendar | ཤིང་མོ་བྱ་ལོ་ (female Wood-Bird) −88 or −469 or −1241 — to — མེ་ཕོ་ཁྱི་ལོ་ (male Fire-Dog) −87 or −468 or −1240 |

Year 215 BC was a year of the pre-Julian Roman calendar. At the time it was known as the Year of the Consulship of Albinus/Marcellus/Verrucosus and Gracchus (or, less frequently, year 539 Ab urbe condita). The denomination 215 BC for this year has been used since the early medieval period, when the Anno Domini calendar era became the prevalent method in Europe for naming years.

== Events ==
=== By place ===
==== Sardinia ====
- A Carthaginian invasion fleet bound for Sardinia is delayed by bad weather giving the Romans the time to organize an intervention; the Roman general Titus Manlius Torquatus, one of it original conquerors, is sent to Sardinia with an army.
- Battle of Decimomannu, the Romans led by Torquatus defeat a combined Sardinian/Carthaginian army ending the Sardinian rebellion and driving off the Carthaginians.
- On its return journey the Carthaginian invasion fleet is harassed by Roman squadrons operating from Sicily.

==== Spain ====
- The Carthaginian general, Hannibal, is denied any reinforcements from Spain for his forces now based in Italy by the activities of the Roman general Publius Cornelius Scipio and his brother Gnaeus Cornelius Scipio Calvus, who, in a battle at Dertosa near the Ebro River effectively stop the Carthaginian general, Hasdrubal's attempt to break through to Italy.

==== Roman Republic ====
- The Roman law, Lex Oppia, is instituted by Gaius Oppius, a tribune of the plebs during the consulship of Quintus Fabius Maximus Verrucosus and Tiberius Sempronius Gracchus. The Lex Oppia is the first of a series of sumptuary laws introduced in Rome. It not only restricts women's wealth, but also their displaying it.
- The Roman general, Marcus Claudius Marcellus, again repulses an attack by Hannibal on the city of Nola.
- Hannibal's forces occupy the cities of Heraclea and Thurii. However, Hannibal is unable to prevent the Romans from besieging Capua.

==== Greece ====
- Philip V of Macedon and Hannibal negotiate an alliance under which they pledge mutual support and defence. Specifically, they agree to support each other against Rome, and that Hannibal shall have the right to make peace with Rome, but that any peace would include Philip and that Rome would be forced to give up control of Corcyra, Apollonia, Epidamnus, Pharos, Dimale, Parthini and Atintania and to restore to Demetrius of Pharos all his lands currently controlled by Rome.

==== Seleucid Empire ====
- The Seleucid king, Antiochus III, crosses the Taurus Mountains, uniting his forces with Attalus of Pergamum and, in one campaign, deprives his rebel general, Achaeus, of all his dominions and takes Sardis (with the exception of the citadel).

==== China ====
- Emperor Qin Shi Huang orders the construction of his mausoleum to begin(source?), including the famous Terracotta Army.
- In what is claimed to be a preemptive strike, Qin forces under Meng Tian drive the Xiongnu and other northern peoples from their homeland on the Ordos Plateau.

== Births ==
- Antiochus IV Epiphanes, king of the Seleucid Empire (d. 164 BC) (approximate date)

== Deaths ==
- Apollonius of Rhodes, Greek author (b. 295 BC)
- Hiero II, tyrant of Syracuse from 270 BC (b. c. 308 BC)
- Hieronymus, grandson of Hiero II of Syracuse and tyrant (assassinated) (b. c. 231 BC)
- Samprati, Mauryan emperor of Magadha
- Emperor Kōrei of Japan, according to legend
