= Tigellius =

Lyric poet from the time of Julius Caesar

- Born: Tigellius Hermogenes; 1st century BC; Sardinia, Province of Corsica and Sardinia, Roman Republic
- Died: 40 BC; Rome
- Resting place: Rome
- Occupations: Singer, poet
- Writing career
- Language: Latin
- Genre: Lyric poetry

Tigellius (1st century BC – 40 BC), was a lyric poet during the time of Julius Caesar. The little information we have about him derives from the Satires of Horace and some letters of Cicero. From them we know that he was a Sardinian, a fine singer and a close friend of Julius Caesar.

== Identification ==
Some scholia identified Tigellius with Tigellius Hermogenes mentioned in other parts of the Satires. Such identification was rejected by André Dacier, in his edition of the works of Horace, but few scholars agreed with him until Karl Kirchner presented a detailed argument for the interpretation of Dacier. According to Berthold Ullman however, the version of the scholiasts cannot be excluded, nor are Kirchner's arguments irrefutable. The Tigellius mentioned in some verses of Satires is in fact the same mentioned by Cicero in some of his letters.

Cicero, Horace and Licinius Macer Calvus used to call him either Tigellius or Sardus Tigellius ("Tigellius the Sardinian"), and never Hermogenes. Cicero spoke ill of Tigellius, stating "it is a clear gain to be free from the society of this Sardinian, who is even more pestiferous than his own homeland (pestilentiorem patria sua)". Nevertheless, it is very likely that Hermogenes is the name of the Sardinian Tigellius. The combination of a Roman name and a Greek surname also reveals that he is a freedman.

== Bibliography ==
- Karl Kirchner, Questiones horatianae, Leipzig, 1834
- Berthold Ullman, Horace, Catullus, and Tigellius, Classical Philology Vol. 10, No. 3, The University of Chicago Press, Chicago Jul. 1915, pp. 270–296
