= Hasdrubal the Bald =

Carthaginian general in the Second Punic War

Hasdrubal the Bald (Latin: Hasdrubal Calvus; Punic: 𐤏𐤆𐤓𐤁𐤏𐤋, ʿAzrubaʿal, "Help of Baal") was a Carthaginian general in the Second Punic War. In 215 BCE, Hasdrubal was sent by Carthage to take the restive Roman territory of Sardinia, but his fleet was wrecked en route in a storm off the Balearic Islands. By the time he regrouped and arrived, Manlius Torquatus had largely pacified the territory, defeating Hiostus, son of the Sardinian leader Hampsicora, and was well-prepared against Hasdrubal's arrival. Manlius handily defeated the combined Carthaginian and Sardinian forces in the Battle of Decimomannu, in which Hasdrubal the Bald was captured.

== See also ==
- Other Hasdrubals in Carthaginian history
