= Hasdrubal =

Hasdrubal (Ancient Greek: Ἀσδρούβας, romanized: Hasdroúbas) is the Latinized form of the Carthaginian name ʿAzrubaʿal (Punic: 𐤏𐤆𐤓𐤁𐤏𐤋, romanized: ʿAzrōbaʿl, lit. 'Help of Baal').

It may refer to:

== Historic Carthaginian people ==
- Hasdrubal I of Carthage was the Magonid king of Ancient Carthage from 530 to 510 BC.
- Hasdrubal, son of Hanno (fl. 250 BC), a Carthaginian commander during the First Punic War
- Hasdrubal the Fair (c. 270 BC – 221 BC), son-in-law of Hamilcar Barca
- Hasdrubal Barca (245–207 BC), son of Hamilcar Barca and brother of Hannibal and Mago
- Hasdrubal Gisco (died 202 BC), another commander in the Second Punic War
- Hasdrubal the Bald, a Carthaginian general in the Second Punic War
- Hasdrubal the Boetharch, the general of Punic forces in the Third Punic War c. 146 BC
- Hasdrubal (quartermaster), a Carthaginian officer in the Second Punic War c. 218 BC
- original name of Carthaginian Clitomachus (philosopher) (187/6–110/09 BC)

== The name in modern times ==
- Asdrubal, a list of people with the modern given name

== Other uses ==
- The name has also been used for the Hasdrubal gas field off the Tunisian coast
