= Hampsicora =

Sardo-Carthaginian soldier

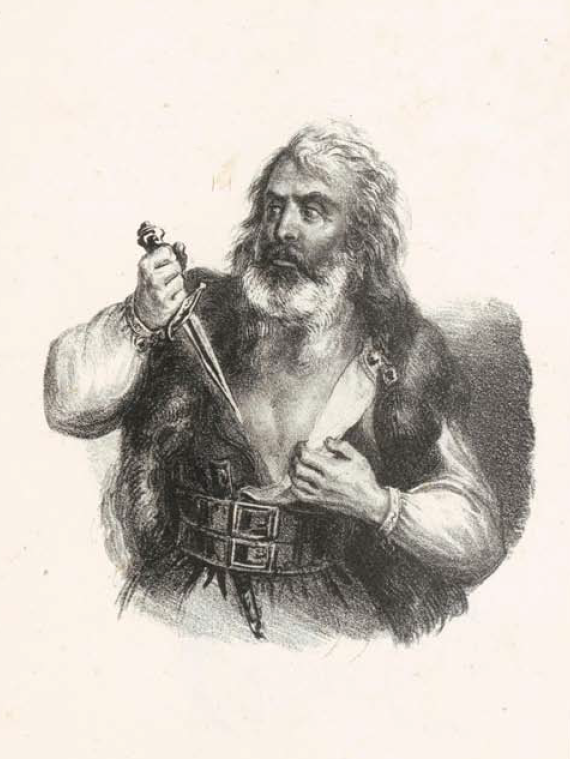
- Imaginary 1837 portrait
- Died: 215 BC; Cornus
- Known for: Anti-Roman revolt in Sardinia
- Children: 1 son

Hampsicora (died 215 BC) was a Sardo-Punic political leader and landowner of Sardinia, and the leader of the major anti-Roman revolt (Bellum Sardum) in the province of 215 BC.

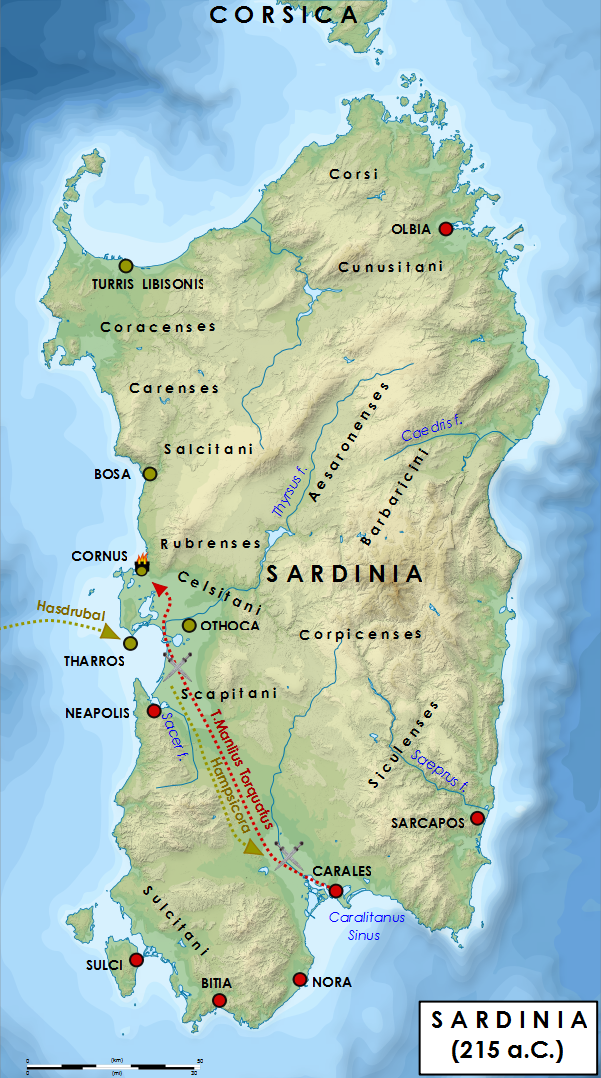
Map of the revolt

The sources describe Hampsicora as the richest among the landowners of Sardinia, which at that time appeared to be split into two entities: the Carthaginian-dominated Southern and Western agricultural coastline, including the vast Campidano plain, and the more inland areas that maintained their independence and, while being eventually tolerant of the Carthaginians after many skirmishes, were nonetheless hostile to the Roman conquest. Ever since the late Nuragic era, the Sardinians and Carthaginians had been on good terms with each other, finding a common ground on their resentment against the Romans.

In conjunction with Hannibal's victories in Italy, Hampsicora led, along with Hanno of Tharros, the revolts of the Sardinian coastal cities against the Romans in 215 BC, succeeding in gaining the support of the Nuragic Sardinians (Sardi Pelliti), especially the Ilienses tribes. Also, the senators of Cornus, the city of which Hampsicora was the chief magistrate, sent ambassadors to Carthage asking aid for the Sardinians who were aware of what was happening in Sardinia and the Italian peninsula. Carthage then sent Hasdrubal the Bald, with an army of about ten thousand soldiers.

Meanwhile, Titus Manlius Torquatus, the Roman consul, gathered four legions in Caralis and went to Cornus. Manlius surprised the few troops of Cornus, led by Hiostus, son of Hampsicora, who was defeated, having made the mistake of facing the enemy in the open field without waiting for further reinforcements. In fact, Hampsicora was asking for reinforcements for the Sardinians.

Shortly after Hasdrubal the Bald finally arrived at Tharros with his army. When Manlius heard about the arrival of the Carthaginians, he preferred to withdraw to Caralis, while Hasdrubal mingled with Hampsicora. Hampsicora's plan was to march on Calaris in order to cut off the supply routes of the other cities of the western coast that had fallen into Roman hands.

The pitched battle between the two armies took place near Decimomannu, according to Francesco Cesare Casula, between the two rivers in the area, a few miles north of Caralis and saw the defeat of the rebels and the death of Hiostus.

Hampsicora fled to safety, taking refuge among the inland tribes. However, according to Livy and Silius Italicus, saddened by the death of his son Hiostus and eager not to fall into Roman hands, killed himself.

== Origin of the name ==
The name of Hampsicora is thought to have Berber origin. There are some ancient toponyms related to the name of Hampsicora in contemporary Algeria and Tunisia, like the river Ampsaga (today's Rhummel in Algerian Arabic), bordering with the Numidian Massylii in the vicinity of Cirta. However, some linguists have questioned such connection, linking the origin of the personal name to the ancient Aegeo-Anatolian region.

== See also ==
- Nuragic civilization
- Ancient Carthage
- Sardinia and Corsica

== Bibliography ==
- Piero Meloni, La Sardegna romana, Chiarella, Sassari, 1975; new edition extended in 1990.
- Attilio Mastino, editor, Storia della Sardegna antica, Il maestrale, Nuoro, 2005; available at Sardegna Cultura, the cultural portal of the Autonomous Region of Sardinia.
- Maurizio Corona, La rivolta di Ampsicora: cronaca della prima grande insurrezione sarda (215 BC), Akademeia, Cagliari, 2005.
- Massimo Pittau, L'eroe Hampsicora era sardo, non cartaginese, available at the website of the author, former professor of Sardinian linguistics at the University of Sassari.
- Frantziscu Casula - Amos Cardia, Amsicora, Alfa Editrice, Quartu, 2007.
- Francesco Casula, Uomini e donne di Sardegna, pp. 9–30, Alfa editrice, Quartu 2010.
- Casula, Francesco Cesare (1994). La storia di Sardegna. Sassari: Delfino Editore. ISBN 88-7138-063-0.
- Tonino Oppes, Ampsicora Eroe sardo, Condaghes, Cagliari 2014.
- Onnis, Omar; Mureddu, Manuelle (2019). Illustres. Vita, morte e miracoli di quaranta personalità sarde (in Italian). Sestu: Domus de Janas. ISBN 978-88-97084-90-7. OCLC 1124656644.
