= Aquae Neapolitanae =

Coordinates: 39°36′50″N 8°47′11″E

The Aquae Neapolitanae or Aquae Calidae Neapolitanorum are springs and their adjoining population nucleus mentioned by Ptolemy as well as in the Antonine Itinerary, which places them at a considerable distance inland from Neapolis, on the road from Othoca (near Oristano) to Caralis (modern Cagliari), Sardinia, Italy. They are identified with the mineral sources now known as the Bagni di Sardara, on the high road from Cagliari to Oristano. (Itin. Ant. p. 82; Ptol. iii. 3. § 7; Geogr. Rav. v. 26; De la Marmora, Voy. en Sardaigne, vol. ii. p. 406.)
