= Battle of Decimomannu =

Roman victory during the Second Punic War

- Part of the Second Punic War
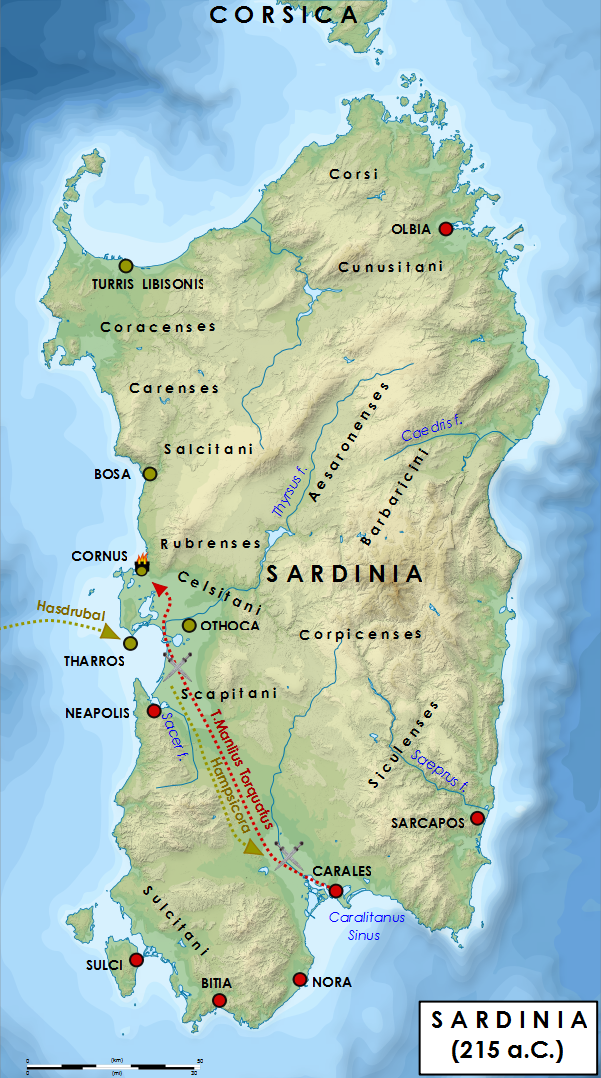
- Map of the campaign
Date	Fall 215 BC
Location	Decimomannu, Sardinia 40°05′36″N 8°30′29″E
Result	Roman victory: Sack of Cornus

Belligerents
Roman Republic	Carthage; Nuragic Sardinians

Commanders and leaders
Titus Manlius Torquatus	Hasdrubal the Bald (POW); Hampsicora †

Strength
22,000 infantry 1,200 cavalry	15,000 infantry 1,500 cavalry + Sardinians (?) + Elephants (?)

Casualties and losses
unknown	13,500 casualties; 12,000 killed and 1,500 captured.

The Battle of Decimomannu, Battle of Cornus or Battle of Caralis was fought 215 BC on the island of Sardinia when a Carthaginian army sailed to the island to support a local revolt against Roman rule. The army, led by Hasdrubal the Bald, fought a Roman army of similar size under the praetor Titus Manlius Torquatus in the Fall of 215 BC somewhere between Sestu and Decimomannu, just north of Caralis. The Romans destroyed the Carthaginian army and then scattered their fleet in a sea battle south of Sardinia.

== Strategic situation ==
The Romans were hard pressed after the Battle of Cannae, with several South Italian cities deserting to Carthage. Hannibal Barca and his army were active in Campania, while a second Carthaginian army under Hanno, son of Bomilcar had become active in Bruttium. The Romans fielded several armies, which avoided attacking Hannibal but struck at his allies whenever possible.

In Iberia, Hasdrubal Barca, brother of Hannibal, had been fighting skirmishes with the Scipio brothers (Publius and Gnaeus) since his defeat in the Battle of Ebro River. In 216 BC, the Carthaginian Senate sent him reinforcements with orders to march to Italy. In Africa, Mago Barca was put in command of an army of 12,000 infantry, 1,500 horse, and 20 elephants with orders to join Hannibal.

The Romans had been fighting the native Sardinians from time to time, ever since they obtained Sardinia through blackmail in 237 BC. By 216 BC, the situation on the island was ripe for revolt. The single Roman Legion posted there was understrength from sickness. The praetor, Q. Mucius Scavola, was also sick. Payment and provisions from Rome were irregular. Hampsicora, a Punic-Sardinian landowner, asked for aid from Carthage. Carthage sent an officer named Hanno to finance the revolt and then raised an army similar to that of Mago's for an expedition to Sardinia. Hasdrubal the Bald and another Mago was in charge of the expedition.

Before the Carthaginian expedition sailed for Sardinia, the strategic situation changed. Hanno the Elder was defeated by Tiberius Sempronius Longus in Lucania, and Hasdrubal Barca lost most of his field army in the Battle of Dertosa in Iberia. The Carthaginian senate ordered Mago to Iberia, but the Sardinian expedition sailed as planned. However, a storm blew the fleet off course to the Balearic Islands, where many ships had to be hauled ashore and repaired (Livy xxiii 36, Lazenby J.F p96-98). This delayed the Carthaginian arrival in Sardinia.

== Prelude ==
Hampsicora was busy raising an army and collecting provisions near the city of Cornus (near Cuglieri on the western coast of Sardinia). The Carthaginian delay gave the Romans the opportunity to send fresh forces under the praetor Titus Manlius Torquatus, who had served as consul in Sardinia in 235 BC. Total Roman forces in Sardinia rose to 20,000 infantry and 1,200 horse with his arrival.

Manlius managed to draw Hiostus, Hampsicora's son, into a rash attack on the Romans while Hampsicora was away on a recruiting mission. In the ensuing battle, 5,700 Sardinians were killed and the rebel army was scattered.

Hasdrubal the Bald arrived in Sardinia in the fall of 215. He landed at Tharros, and gathered what Sardinian forces he could find, and marched towards Caralis. In response, Manlius marched out with the army.

== Battle ==
Campaigns in Sardinia, 215 BC

The opponents did not immediately engage with each other. They encamped close to each other and spent some days skirmishing. When neither side gained any advantage, the respective commanders decided on battle.

The armies formed up traditionally, with cavalry on the wings and infantry in the centre. It is not known if the Carthaginians had elephants with them. The battle was hotly contested for four hours, with neither side gaining an advantage. The decisive moment came when the Roman detachment facing the Sardinians on one of the wings of the Carthaginian line managed to drive them from the field. The victorious Roman wing then wheeled inward and attacked the Carthaginian line, which gave way and was slaughtered. Hasdrubal, Mago, and Hanno were captured and Hiostus killed. Hampsicora fled the field, and then committed suicide. The survivors took refuge in Cornus, which was taken by assault a few days later as a result of a battle fought on a plateau known as Su campu de Corra ("Horns field"). The Punic fleet managed to extricate some of the survivors.

== Battle of Sardinia Sea ==
The expedition was carried by an unknown number of transports and escorted by 60 quinqueremes. These took the remnants of the expedition and sailed to Africa. On the way, they encountered the Sicilian contingent of the Roman fleet returning from a raiding mission in Africa. The Roman fleet, 100 quinqueremes strong and commanded by Titus Ocatilius Crassus, attacked and captured seven Carthaginian ships, while the rest scattered and made for Africa. Roman losses are not known (Livy xiii 46).

== Aftermath and importance ==
Campaigns in Sicily and North Africa, 215 BC

The Sardinian rebel cities surrendered to the Romans, enabling Manlius to send part of the Roman forces back to Italy. The grain supply from Sardinia remained uninterrupted and the Carthaginian navy was denied bases nearer to Italy. With the damage to Roman agriculture, the protection of the overseas grain supply was crucial. Aside from naval raids on Sardinia in 210 BC, Carthage did not threaten Roman domination in Sardinia again.

While the Sicilian contingent of the Roman fleet was busy off Sardinia, the admiral of the main Punic fleet, Bomilcar, managed to sail to Locri in Bruttium and land a force of 4,000 Numidian horse and 40 elephants for Hannibal. Given the fact that the lack of proper support from Carthage was one of the reasons for Hannibal's failure, the impact of this reinforcement has not been properly explained.
