= Neapolis (Sardinia) =

Ancient city on Sardinia

Neapolis, Sardinia
- Location within Sardinia
- 39.6875°N 8.5552°E
- Location: Sardinia, Italy
- Region: Province of South Sardinia

Neapolis (Ancient Greek: Νεάπολις; Punic: 𐤒𐤓𐤕𐤇𐤃𐤔𐤕, romanized: Qart Ḥadašt; Sardinian: Nabui; lit. 'New City') was an ancient city of Sardinia founded by the Carthaginians in the sixth century BC, and apparently one of its most important places. It was situated on the west coast, at the southern end of the Gulf of Oristano, at the present-day località of Santa Maria di Nabui, in the comune of Guspini, Province of South Sardinia.

The Antonine itineraries place Neapolis 60 miles from Sulci (in modern Sant'Antioco) and 18 from Othoca (modern Santa Giusta near Oristano), both also Phoenician settlements. (Itin. Ant. p. 84.) Pliny calls it one of the most important towns in Sardinia, and its name is found also in Ptolemy and the Itineraries. (Plin. iii. 7. s. 13; Ptol. iii. 3. § 2; Itin. Ant. l. c.; Tab. Peut.; Geogr. Rav. v. 26.) Its ruins are still visible at the mouth of the river Pabillonis, where it forms the estuary or lagoon, Stagno di Marceddi, and present many remains of ancient buildings as well as the vestiges of a Roman road and aqueduct. The spot is marked by an ancient church called Santa Maria di Nabui. (De la Marmora, Voy. en Sardaigne, vol. ii. p. 357.)

The Aquae Neapolitanae mentioned by Ptolemy as well as in the Itinerary, which places them at a considerable distance inland, on the road from Othoca to Caralis (modern Cagliari), are certainly the mineral sources now known as the Bagni di Sardara, on the high road from Cagliari to Oristano. (Itin. Ant. p. 82; Ptol. iii. 3. § 7; Geogr. Rav. v. 26; De la Marmora, l. c. p. 406.)

== See also ==
- List of Phoenician cities
