= Asdrúbal Colmenarez =

Venezuelan-French artist (1936–2025)

Asdrúbal Colmenárez (1 August 1936 – 12 April 2025) was a Venezuelan-born French contemporary artist. He was first invited to represent Venezuela at the Paris Art Biennale in 1969. In 1970 he won a fellowship from the Guggenheim Foundation in New York City. Besides being an artist, Colmenárez was professor of Contemporary Art at the Université de Vincennes, Paris beginning in 1973. Colmenarez represented his country at the Havana Art Biennale in 1983 and 1985.

For more than 40 years, Colmenárez based his investigations around the "event". An art piece acquires exponential magnitude when the spectator has been stimulated and provided with certain tools to create and manipulate. These works are mostly "Psycho-magnetic Tactiles" (started in 1970) and "Psychorelatives" (begun in 1972).

Colmenarez lived and worked in Paris from May 1968 until his death in 12 April 2025, at the age of 88.

== Sources ==
- Museo de arte Contemporaneo de Caracas Sofia Imber, book 1998, legal deposition If25219987002034
- John Simon Guggenheim Memorial Foundation
- Banco Central de Venezuela, Collection of Art List
