= Titus Manlius Torquatus (consul 235 BC) =

Roman senator and general (before 279 BC – 202 BC)

Titus Manlius Torquatus (before 279 BC – 202 BC) was a politician of the Roman Republic. He had a long and distinguished career, being consul in 235 BC and 224 BC, censor in 231 BC, and dictator in 208 BC. He was an ally of Fabius Maximus "Cunctator".

== Family background ==
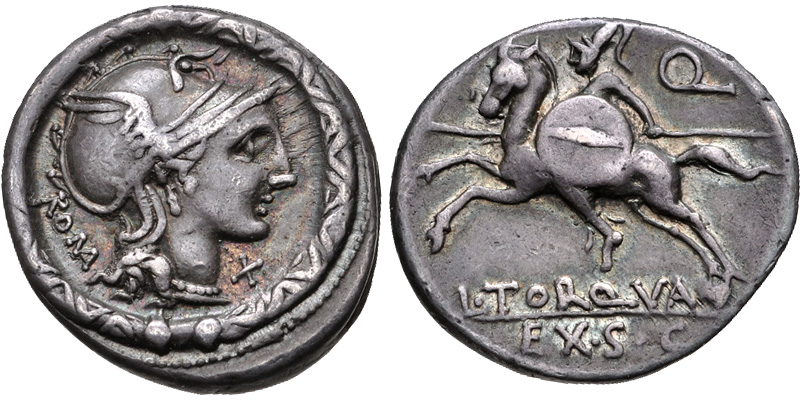
Denarius of Lucius Manlius Torquatus, Titus' great-great-grandson, 113–112 BC. The obverse depicts the head of Roma within a torque, the emblem of the Manlii Torquati. The reverse depicts a warrior charging into battle on horseback, beneath the letter 'Q', signifying Torquatus' quaestorship.

Titus belonged to the patrician gens Manlia, one of the most important gentes of the Republic. It already counted 13 consulships, and 14 consular tribuneships before him. Titus' ancestry is a bit uncertain as the Fasti Consulares list him with the same filiation ("son of Titus, grandson of Titus") as Aulus Manlius Torquatus Atticus, who was consul two times in 244 BC and 241 BC, as well as censor in 247 BC, and possibly princeps senatus. Münzer tentatively supposed that Aulus was Titus' uncle. Titus' father and grandfather are not known, but his great-grandfather—also named Titus—was consul in 299 BC.

The cognomen Torquatus was first received by Titus' ancestor Titus Manlius Imperiosus in 361 BC after he had defeated a Gaul in single combat, and took his torque as a trophy. The torque then became the emblem of the family, whose members proudly put it on the coins they minted. Imperiosus Torquatus was famous for his severity; he famously killed his own son after he had disobeyed him during a battle.

== Political career ==
=== Consul (235 BC) ===
Titus' early career is not known because Livy's books on years 292 BC – 220 BC are lost. However, Broughton guessed that he entered the college of pontiffs in his youth, since he tried to be pontifex maximus in 212 BC and was therefore one of its senior members.

His first recorded mention was his election as consul in 235 BC, alongside Gaius Atilius Bulbus, a plebeian who had already been consul in 245 BC. Eutropius and Cassiodorus—who relied on Livy—described Titus as the consul prior, which means the Centuriate Assembly elected him before Atilius.

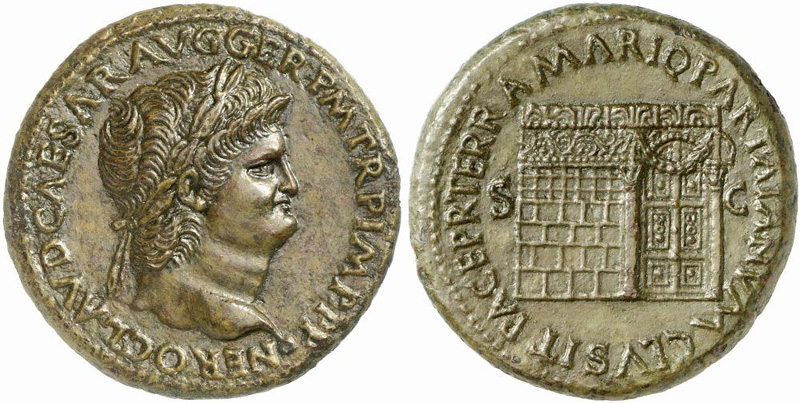
Sestertius of Nero, circa AD 65, showing on the reverse the Temple of Janus with its gates closed.

Titus was sent to Sardinia, which had just come under Roman control in the aftermath of the First Punic War (264 BC – 241 BC). The war indemnity demanded by Rome was so high that Carthage could not pay its mercenaries, who rebelled. While Carthage was fighting the mercenaries in Africa, its mercenaries stationed in Sardinia decided to rebel as well. Rome initially refused to support the Sardinian rebels, but in 237 BC Rome prevented Carthage from reclaiming the island on the pretext that its army had actually turned against Rome. Titus' mission was therefore to pacify the island, which he did successfully. He received a triumph for his victory over the rebels as a result. Several ancient authors tell that after his victory, Titus closed the doors of the Temple of Janus, symbolically meaning that Rome and its neighbours were at peace. It was only the first time that the temple was closed since the reign of Numa Pompilius—the legendary second king of Rome—and remained so for eight years; its gates then stayed open until Augustus closed them again after the Battle of Actium in 31 BC. However, Livy says that this event took place "after the First Punic War", so some modern scholars place it in 241 BC, when Aulus Manlius Torquatus—Titus' uncle—was consul in order to celebrate the end of the First Punic War. This view has however been contested.

Titus' consulship marks a return to normal after the aggressive foreign policy of his predecessors, Lucius and Publius Cornelius Lentulus Caudinus, proponents of an expansionist strategy against Carthage and the Celts in Northern Italy. This policy lasted until 232 BC and the first consulship of Fabius Maximus, the most important Roman statesman of the second half of the third century, and the leader of the "peace faction" at Rome. The very powerful gens Fabia was also allied with the Manlii since at least the fourth century.

=== Censor and consul for the second time (231–224 BC) ===
In 231 BC, Titus was elected censor prior with Quintus Fulvius Flaccus, who had already been consul in 237 BC. Because of a flaw in their election, they had to resign and could not complete the lustrum (the ritual purification of the Roman people). They were replaced the next year by Fabius Cunctator and Marcus Sempronius Tuditanus.

In 224 BC, Titus was elected consul for a second time, with his former short-term colleague Fulvius Flaccus, and was once again described as consul prior. Titus and Fulvius were sent north against the Boii, a Celtic tribe at war with Rome since 225. The consuls led the first Roman army to cross the Po river, then defeated the Boii there. The Celts lost 23,000 men and 5,000 of them were captured, but the consuls had to retreat because of poor weather and deaths among their troops.

De Sanctis thought this victory as well as the crossing of the Po were later inventions, since the Fasti Triumphales do not record this victory, which should normally have won a triumph for the consuls. He adds that Polybius tells little about it, just that the consuls headed a strong army and terrified the Boii, who submitted as a result.

=== Role during the Second Punic War (218–202 BC) ===
In 216 BC, as a senior senator, Titus successfully opposed the ransoming of the Romans taken prisoner at the Battle of Cannae, on the grounds that they had made no effort to break out of the Carthaginian lines.

In 215 BC, as praetor, Titus was sent to Sardinia with an army, after Quintus Mucius Scaevola, Sardinia's governor, became ill and the Senate found out the Carthaginians were planning an attempt to take back the island. He defeated a combined army of Carthaginians and Sardinian rebels under Hasdrubal the Bald and Hampsicora at the Battle of Decimomannu and secured Sardinia for Rome.

However, he also suffered a number of reverses. In 212 BC, he and Flaccus contested for the position of Pontifex Maximus (chief priest of Rome), and both lost to a younger and less distinguished man, Publius Licinius Crassus. It is unclear from Livy's account if Licinius Crassus benefited from the inevitable division of votes between the two ex-censors, or whether he was always favoured for the role.

In 210 BC, he was the oldest living patrician senator, but he was not chosen Princeps Senatus. The censor Publius Sempronius Tuditanus preferred that the honour go to the most distinguished senior senator, who was, in his view, Quintus Fabius Maximus Verrucosus, a man who had been first consul in 233 BC and censor in 230 BC. The other censor, Marcus Cornelius Cethegus, preferred to go by the mos maiorum, but the choice was Tuditanus' to make.

Francis Ryan suggested that because of the closure of the Temple of Janus, Titus was associated with peace, and it played against him in this time of total war against Hannibal.

Two years later (208 BC) he was appointed dictator in order to hold the elections and preside over the games that had been promised by the Praetor M. Aemilius.

== Death and posterity ==
Titus died in 202 BC. As his son had died before him, he was survived by his two grandsons, Titus and Aulus, who became consul in 165 BC and 164 BC, respectively. The elder grandson, Titus, was especially known for his severity, as he organised a private trial of his son for bribery, who committed suicide after he had banished him from his sight. The consul of 165 BC therefore emulated the severity of his ancestors, including that of his grandfather, whose deeds were reported by the annalists as examples of the imperia Manliana, the "Manlian orders".

The Torquati were also known for the death masks of their ancestors displayed in the atrium of the familial house. It is likely that Titus' mask was placed there, alongside those of Marcus Manlius Capitolinus and Imperiosus Torquatus.

== Stemma of the Manlii Torquati ==
Stemma taken from Münzer until "A. Manlius Torquatus, d. 208", and then Mitchell, with corrections. All dates are BC.

Legend
Orange	Dictator	Yellow	Censor	Green	Consul

T. Manlius; Imperiosus Torquatus dict. 353, 349, 320 cos. 347, 344, 340
T. Manlius Torquatus d. 340
T. Manlius Torquatus cos. 299	L. Manlius Torquatus legate 295
T. Manlius Torquatus
T. Manlius Torquatus	A. Manlius Torquatus; Atticus cens. 247; cos. 244, 241
T. Manlius Torquatus cos. 235, 224 cens. 231; dict. 208
A. Manlius Torquatus d. 208
T. Manlius Torquatus cos. 165	A. Manlius Torquatus cos. 164
T. Manlius Torquatus pr. 137	D. Junius; Silanus Manlianus pr. 141, d. 140	A. Manlius Torquatus
T. Manlius Torquatus	L. Manlius Torquatus qu. circa 113	A. Manlius Torquatus pr. 70
T. Manlius Torquatus pr. 69	P. Cornelius; Lentulus Spinther (adopted) augur 57	Manlia	L. Manlius Torquatus cos. 65	A. Manlius Torquatus	T. Manlius Torquatus
L. Manlius Torquatus pr. 49	A. Manlius Torquatus qu. 43, pontifex

== Bibliography ==
=== Ancient works ===
- Cassiodorus, Chronica.
- Eutropius, Brevarium.
- Titus Livius (Livy), History of Rome, Periochae.
- Orosius, Historiae Adversus Paganos (Histories against the Pagans).
- Plutarch, Parallel lives.
- Polybius, Historiae (The Histories).
- Valerius Maximus, Factorum ac Dictorum Memorabilium (Memorable Deeds and Sayings).

=== Modern works ===
- Michael C. Alexander, Trials in the Late Roman Republic, 149 to 50 BC, University of Toronto Press, 1990.
- T. Robert S. Broughton, The Magistrates of the Roman Republic, American Philological Association, 1952–1986.
- Michael Crawford, Roman Republican Coinage, Cambridge University Press (1974–2001).
- J. A. Crook, F. W. Walbank, M. W. Frederiksen, R. M. Ogilvie (editors), The Cambridge Ancient History, vol. VIII, Rome and the Mediterranean to 133 B.C., Cambridge University Press, 1989.
- Harriet I. Flower, The Art of Forgetting: Disgrace & Oblivion in Roman Political Culture, University of North Carolina Press, 2006.
- Dexter Hoyos, Unplanned Wars: The Origins of the First and Second Punic Wars, Berlin & New York, Walter de Gruyter, 1998.
- Christina S. Kraus, John Marincola, Christopher Pelling (editors), Ancient Historiography and Its Contexts, Studies in Honour of A. J. Woodman, Oxford University Press, 2010.
- Harold Mattingly, Edward A. Sydenham, C. H. V. Sutherland, The Roman Imperial Coinage, vol. I, from 31 BC to AD 69, London, Spink & Son, 1923–1984.
- Jane F. Mitchell, "The Torquati", in Historia: Zeitschrift für Alte Geschichte, vol. 15, part 1, (January 1966), pp. 23–31.
- Friedrich Münzer, Roman Aristocratic Parties and Families, translated by Thérèse Ridley, Johns Hopkins University Press, 1999 (originally published in 1920).
- August Pauly, Georg Wissowa, et alii, Realencyclopädie der Classischen Altertumswissenschaft, J. B. Metzler, Stuttgart (1894–1980).
- Francis X. Ryan, Rank and Participation in the Republican Senate, Stuttgart, Franz Steiner Verlag, 1998.
- Lily Ross Taylor and T. Robert S. Broughton, "The Order of the Two Consuls' Names in the Yearly Lists", Memoirs of the American Academy in Rome, 19 (1949), pp. 3–14.
- F. W. Walbank, A. E. Astin, M. W. Frederiksen, R. M. Ogilvie (editors), The Cambridge Ancient History, vol. VII, part 2, The Rise of Rome to 220 B.C., Cambridge University Press, 1989.
- Stephen P. Oakley, A Commentary on Livy, Books VI–X, Volume IV: Book X, Oxford University Press, 2005.

Preceded by Publius Cornelius Lentulus Caudinus; Gaius Licinius Varus	Roman consul with Gaius Atilius Bulbus; 235 BC	Succeeded by Lucius Postumius Albinus; Spurius Carvilius Maximus Ruga
Preceded by Lucius Aemilius Papus; Gaius Atilius Regulus	Roman consul II with Quintus Fulvius Flaccus; 224 BC	Succeeded by Gaius Flaminius; Publius Furius Philus
