= Cornus, Sardinia =

Ancient Punic-Roman town of Sardinia

Coordinates: 40.0933°N 8.5081°E

Cornus was an ancient Punic-Roman town of Sardinia near Cuglieri and the location, during the revolt of Hampsicora, of a battle between a Sardinian army and the Roman Republic. The Carthaginians were also involved fighting against the Romans. The town is now unoccupied and is an archaeological site with a large well temple complex still visible.
