= 224 BC =

224 BC in various calendars
- Gregorian calendar: 224 BC; CCXXIV BC
- Ab urbe condita: 530
- Ancient Egypt era: XXXIII dynasty, 100
- Pharaoh: Ptolemy III Euergetes, 23
- Ancient Greek Olympiad (summer): 139th Olympiad (victor)¹
- Assyrian calendar: 4527
- Balinese saka calendar: N/A
- Bengali calendar: −817 – −816
- Berber calendar: 727
- Buddhist calendar: 321
- Burmese calendar: −861
- Byzantine calendar: 5285–5286
- Chinese calendar: 丙子年 (Fire Rat); 2474 or 2267 — to — 丁丑年 (Fire Ox); 2475 or 2268
- Coptic calendar: −507 – −506
- Discordian calendar: 943
- Ethiopian calendar: −231 – −230
- Hebrew calendar: 3537–3538
- Hindu calendars
- Vikram Samvat: −167 – −166
- Shaka Samvat: N/A
- Kali Yuga: 2877–2878
- Holocene calendar: 9777
- Iranian calendar: 845 BP – 844 BP
- Islamic calendar: 871 BH – 870 BH
- Javanese calendar: N/A
- Julian calendar: N/A
- Korean calendar: 2110
- Minguo calendar: 2135 before ROC 民前2135年
- Nanakshahi calendar: −1691
- Seleucid era: 88/89 AG
- Thai solar calendar: 319–320
- Tibetan calendar: མེ་ཕོ་བྱི་བ་ལོ་ (male Fire-Rat) −97 or −478 or −1250 — to — མེ་མོ་གླང་ལོ་ (female Fire-Ox) −96 or −477 or −1249

Year 224 BC was a year of the pre-Julian Roman calendar. At the time it was known as the Year of the Consulship of Torquatus and Flaccus (or, less frequently, year 530 Ab urbe condita). The denomination 224 BC for this year has been used since the early medieval period, when the Anno Domini calendar era became the prevalent method in Europe for naming years.

== Events ==
=== By place ===
==== Greece ====
- After the Spartan King Cleomenes III takes on Pellene, Phlius and Argos, Aratus of Sicyon is forced to call upon King Antigonus III of Macedonia for assistance. Antigonus III's forces fail to pierce Cleomenes' lines near Corinth, but a revolt against Cleomenes at Argos put the Spartans on the defensive.

==== Roman Republic ====
- The Romans, led by Consuls Gaius Atilius Regulus and Lucius Aemilius Papus, decisively defeat the coalition of Cisalpine Gallic tribes at the Battle of Telamon thus extending Roman influence over northern Italy. On the Roman side Gaius Atilius Regulus, commander of the Roman cavalry, is killed in the battle. On the Gallic side, one of the leaders, Concolitanus, is captured in battle, while the leader of the Gaesatae, Aneroëstes, kills himself when the battle is lost.

==== China ====
- Qin begins the invasion of Chu. Initially, the Qin generals Li Xin and Meng Tian capture several cities and defeat the Chu army.
- The Qin Prime Minister Lord Changping, who was born in Chu, incites a Chu rebellion against the Qin invaders. He and the Chu general Xiang Yan then surprise and defeat the Qin army led by Li Xin and Meng Tian in the Battle of Chengfu.
- Taking command of the Qin war effort, Wang Jian twice defeats Xiang Yan and captures Fuchu, the king of Chu, as well as the Chu capital Chen and the city of Pingyu.
- Xiang Yan retreats his forces south of the Huai River and makes Lord Changping the new king of Chu.

== Deaths ==
- Agiatis, Spartan queen
- Aneroëstes, leader of the Gallic Gaesatae (suicide)
- Dasharatha, Mauryan emperor of Magadha (approximate date)
