= 225 BC =

225 BC in various calendars
- Gregorian calendar: 225 BC; CCXXV BC
- Ab urbe condita: 529
- Ancient Egypt era: XXXIII dynasty, 99
- Pharaoh: Ptolemy III Euergetes, 22
- Ancient Greek Olympiad (summer): 138th Olympiad, year 4
- Assyrian calendar: 4526
- Balinese saka calendar: N/A
- Bengali calendar: −818 – −817
- Berber calendar: 726
- Buddhist calendar: 320
- Burmese calendar: −862
- Byzantine calendar: 5284–5285
- Chinese calendar: 乙亥年 (Wood Pig); 2473 or 2266 — to — 丙子年 (Fire Rat); 2474 or 2267
- Coptic calendar: −508 – −507
- Discordian calendar: 942
- Ethiopian calendar: −232 – −231
- Hebrew calendar: 3536–3537
- Hindu calendars
- Vikram Samvat: −168 – −167
- Shaka Samvat: N/A
- Kali Yuga: 2876–2877
- Holocene calendar: 9776
- Iranian calendar: 846 BP – 845 BP
- Islamic calendar: 872 BH – 871 BH
- Javanese calendar: N/A
- Julian calendar: N/A
- Korean calendar: 2109
- Minguo calendar: 2136 before ROC 民前2136年
- Nanakshahi calendar: −1692
- Seleucid era: 87/88 AG
- Thai solar calendar: 318–319
- Tibetan calendar: ཤིང་མོ་ཕག་ལོ་ (female Wood-Boar) −98 or −479 or −1251 — to — མེ་ཕོ་བྱི་བ་ལོ་ (male Fire-Rat) −97 or −478 or −1250

Year 225 BC was a year of the pre-Julian Roman calendar. At the time it was known as the Year of the Consulship of Papus and Regulus (or, less frequently, year 529 Ab urbe condita). The denomination 225 BC for this year has been used since the early medieval period, when the Anno Domini calendar era became the prevalent method in Europe for naming years.

== Events ==
=== By place ===
==== Roman Republic ====
- A coalition of Cisalpine Gallic tribes (Taurini, Taurisces, Insubres, Lingones, Salasses, Agones, and Boii), reinforced by large numbers of Transalpine adventurers called Gaesatae (Gaesati), invade Italy. Avoiding the Romans at Ariminum, the Gauls cross the Apennines into Etruria and plunder the country.
- To meet this invasion, the Romans call on the Insubres' enemies, the Adriatic Veneti, the Patavini, and the Cenomani, who rapidly mobilise defensive forces. These armies are placed under the command of consuls Lucius Aemilius Papus and Gaius Atilius Regulus. After the Battle of Faesulae (near Montepulciano) between the Gauls and a Roman army in which the Romans lose many men, the combined Roman forces succeed in outmaneuvering the Gauls and force the invaders towards the coast of Tuscany. Papus pursued and harassed their rear but did not risk a pitched battle. The other Consul, Regulus, had crossed from Sardinia, landed at Pisa, and was marching towards Rome. His scouts met the Celts' advance guard head on near Telamon (modern Talamone), in an area called Campo Regio.
- Battle of Telamon: The Romans, led by the consuls Gaius Atilius Regulus and Lucius Aemilius Papus, defeated the Celts led by the Gaesatae kings Concolitanus and Aneroëstes.

==== Seleucid Empire ====
- Seleucus III Ceraunus succeeds his father Seleucus II Callinicus as ruler of the Seleucid dynasty, and takes up the task of reconquering Pergamum in Anatolia from Attalus. However, Andromachus, the first general whom he sends, is decisively defeated and captured by Attalus.

==== China ====
- The state of Qin, its armies led by Wang Ben, conquers the state of Wei.

== Deaths ==
- Seleucus II Callinicus, king of the Seleucid Empire (246-225 BC)
- Gaius Atilius Regulus, consul of the Roman Republic (Battle of Telamon).
