= Felice Andreis =

Italian photographer (1907–2015)

- Born: 21 June 1907; Turin, Kingdom of Italy
- Died: 7 March 2015 (aged 107); Giuncarico, Province of Grosseto, Italy
- Occupations: Photographer, agricultural manager and entrepreneur

Felice Andreis (21 June 1907 – 7 March 2015) was an Italian photographer and agricultural entrepreneur, known for his documentary photography of Maremma, Tuscany, through which he recorded rural life, land reclamation projects and agricultural transformations during the 20th century. Influenced by modernist photography, his work was exhibited internationally and published in photographic journals.

== Life and career ==
Born in Turin in 1907 into an aristocratic family, he had the title of baron. He graduated in chemistry from the University of Turin in 1929.

He developed an interest in photography during his youth and began exhibiting his work in 1932, when he took part in the fifth Alpine Photography Exhibition organized by the Turin section of the Italian Alpine Club (CAI). In 1933 he moved to Maremma, Tuscany, where he managed the San Donato estate near Orbetello, then part of the Aziende Agricole Maremmane, a Turin-based company of which he was an executive. During this period he documented rural life, agricultural activities, land reclamation projects and the transformation of the Tuscan landscape through photography. He was also personally involved in reclamation works, including the construction of the Poggio Perotto dam (1934–1938) on the Serra stream, which became one of his recurring photographic subjects. In 1939 he married Angelica "Pupa" Barabesi (1913–2014), a Sienese noblewoman and granddaughter of the bibliographer Raffaello Barabesi, and settled in Giannella, where he became acquainted with prominent intellectuals of the period, including Corrado Alvaro, Guelfo Civinini and Luigi Barzini.

Andreis' photographic style was influenced by modernist photography, with references to international movements such as the Bauhaus and photographers such as László Moholy-Nagy. Nearly all of the photographs from the early 1930s were taken using a Voigtländer lens with 6×9 plates and printed at the Tirone studio in Turin. In 1934 he exhibited in Belgium at the 13th Salon of the Association belge de photographie et cinématographie in Brussels and at the Salon international de photographie in Spa. Many of his photographs were regularly published in the American Annual of Photography. In 1935 he acquired a Leica camera, beginning to produce audiovisual works as well, including a documentary on land reclamation for the Istituto Luce, presented three years later at the Accademia dei Georgofili.

During the World War II part of his photographic archive was lost due to the bombing of Turin. After 1948 Andreis moved to South Africa, where he established an agricultural estate in Paarl. He returned to Maremma in 1975, continuing his photographic activity.

Andreis died in his estate at Poggio Cavallini in Giuncarico on 7 March 2015, aged 107. His archive contains around 15,000 negatives, prints, slides and documents related to his personal and professional life.

Two documentaries have been produced on the figure of baron Felice Andreis: Edo Galli's Il tempo delle bonifiche. La Maremma, il barone, l'Africa. Felice Andreis documentarista (1996), a 15-minute documentary focusing on his work as a documentarian of the Maremma land reclamation projects, and Claudio Longobardi's Il barone fotografo (2008), an 8-minute short film dedicated to his life and photographic activity.

== Sources ==
- Bonazza, Carlo; Citati, Pietro (2003). Felice Andreis. Le fotografie della Maremma 1930-1939. Grosseto: Photoedizioni.
- Ginex, Giovanna (2006). "Fotografia in Maremma: appunti da una ricognizione". In Crispolti, Enrico; Mazzanti, Anna; Quattrocchi, Luca (eds.). Arte in Maremma nella prima metà del Novecento. Cinisello Balsamo: Silvana Editoriale.
