= Marcus Valerius Messalla =

Marcus Valerius Messalla can refer to:

- Marcus Valerius Messalla (consul 226 BC)
- Marcus Valerius Messalla (consul 188 BC)
- Marcus Valerius Messalla (consul 161 BC)
- Marcus Valerius Messalla Niger, consul in 61 BC
- Marcus Valerius Messalla Rufus, consul in 53 BC
- Marcus Valerius Messalla (consul 32 BC)
- Marcus Valerius Messalla Corvinus, consul in 31 BC
- Marcus Valerius Messalla Messallinus, consul in 3 BC
- Marcus Valerius Messala Barbatus (consul 20 AD)
- Marcus Valerius Messalla Corvinus (consul 58)
