= State of the Presidi =

Former territory in Italy

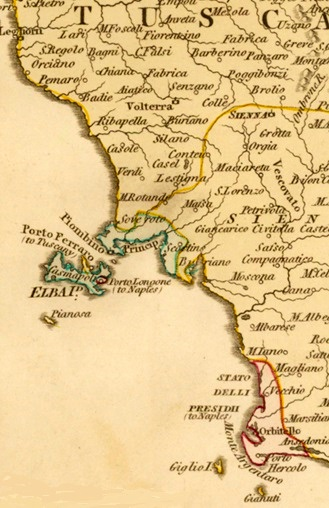
The State of the Presidi, Elba and Piombino in the late 18th century

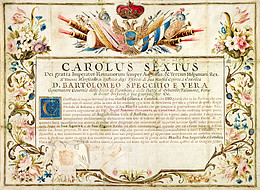
Proclamation issued during the Austrian period (1730)

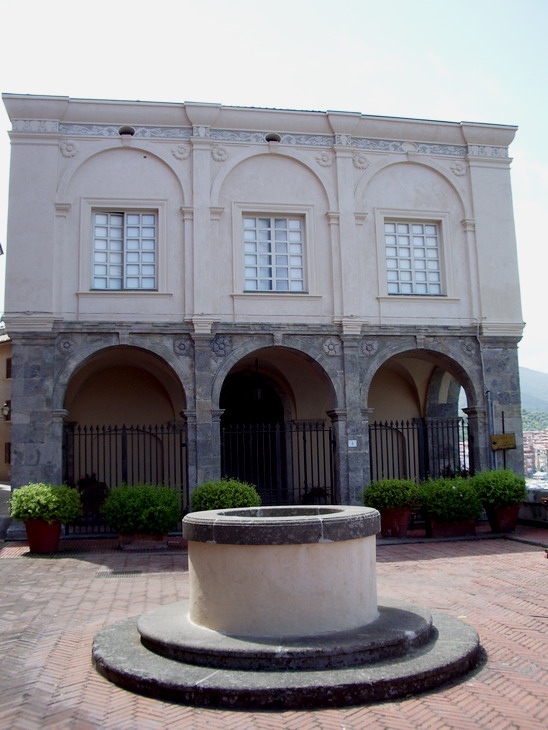
The Palazzo dei Governanti, seat of the Spanish governors in Porto Ercole.

The State of the Presidi (Italian: Stato dei Presidi, (Note: Or Stato degli Presidii, from Spanish: Estado de los Reales Presidios. In French: État des Présides. Dhondt uses "Tuscan presidia".) meaning "state of the garrisons") was a small territory on the Tuscan coast of Italy that existed between 1557 and 1801. It consisted of remnants of the former Republic of Siena—the five towns of Porto Ercole and Porto Santo Stefano on the promontory of Monte Argentario, as well as Orbetello, Talamone and Ansedonia—and their hinterland, along with the islet of Giannutri and the fortress of Porto Longone on the island of Elba.

The Presidi encompassed about 300 square kilometres (120 sq mi). They were effectively attached to the Kingdom of Naples and changed hands several times with it, resulting in three distinct historical periods. From 1557 to 1707, they were a possession of the Crown of Spain administered by the Spanish Habsburg viceroy of Naples; from 1708 to 1733, a possession of the Austrian Habsburgs administered by their viceroy in Naples; and from 1733 to 1801, a dependency of the Spanish Bourbon kings of Naples. By the Treaty of Florence of 28 March 1801, the king of Naples ceded the Presidi to the French Republic, which then ceded them to the new Kingdom of Etruria. After the downfall of France in 1814 and the Congress of Vienna in 1815, the territories were granted to the restored Grand Duchy of Tuscany.

== Origins ==
The Presidi were originally certain strategic coastal territories of the Republic of Siena (nominally part of the Holy Roman Empire) that were retained by Spain after the conquest of the Republic by the Duchy of Florence. Duke Cosimo I de' Medici overran Siena in 1555 during the last Italian War. Cosimo received military support from the Emperor Charles V, also King of Spain, and his son, Philip II, who was king of Naples. Since 1548, Cosimo had also been in occupation of the Lordship of Piombino (including Elba). On 29 May 1557, Philip signed a treaty in London with Lord Iacopo VI Appiani of Piombino. The lordship was restored to Iacopo, with Cosimo retaining the Elban fortress of Portoferraio and Philip reserving the right to garrison the cities of Piombino and Scarlino and fortify the island of Elba.

With the conflict over Piombino resolved, on 3 July 1557 Siena and its contado, less the coastal fortresses, were granted in fief (Note: In Latin, in feudum nobile, ligium, et honorificum.) to Cosimo, in return for which the duke cancelled all debts owed by Philip II or Charles. According to the act of infeudation, "not included, but absolutely excluded, and expressly excluded [are] the Sienese fortresses, castles, ports, places and farmland of, namely, Porto Ercole, Orbetello, Talamone, Monte Argentario and Porto Santo Stefano", a territory of about 287 km^{2}. (Note: In Latin, Nec compraehensa videantur, sed omnino exclusa, et expresse excluduntur, Oppida, Castra, Portus, loca ac terrae agri senensis, videlicet et Portus herculis, Orbitellum, Thelamonium, mons Orizentalius, et Portus Sancti Stefani...) In April 1558, the French, who still held Talamone, made an unsuccessful assault on Orbetello and in September of the same year, the Spaniards took Talamone by force.

== History ==
=== Spanish period (1557–1708) ===
Control of the Presidi allowed the Spanish to monitor maritime traffic between Genoa, an important ally of Spain, and Naples, since in the 16th century ships kept close to the coast. During the Eighty Years' War (1568–1648) and the Franco-Spanish War (1635–59), the Presidi served as a stopover on the so-called Cammino di Fiandra ("path of Flanders"). Soldiers were massed in Naples and then moved in stages to the Spanish Netherlands, to fight Netherlandish rebels or the French. If they took ship in Naples, they usually stopped to revictual in the Presidi before moving on to Genoa; otherwise they marched overland from Naples to the Presidi and took ship there. In 1587 Cosimo's successor, Francesco, offered Philip II a million gold pieces for just one of the Presidi, but the king of Spain refused on the grounds that he had no other ports between Catalonia and Naples.

In the 16th century, the Presidi also provided pasture for Tuscan shepherds, who brought their flocks of sheep to the warm coastal grazing lands during the winter. The Tuscan authorities even taxed the head of sheep as their shepherds brought them to the coast, (Note: See transhumance.) an act which provoked some complaints to the Spanish authorities. In 1603 King Philip III decided to make use of the clause of the treaty of 1557 that allowed Spain to fortify any part of the Island of Elba and on 22 October of the following year he ordered his viceroy, Juan Alonso Pimentel de Herrera, to build a fortress on the island. Construction of Fort San Giacomo at Porto Longone began in March 1605. It had barracks for 2,000 men. The Prince of Piombino, (Note: The lordship of Piombino had been elevated to a principality in 1594.) who shared territorial sovereignty over Elba with the Duke of Tuscany, ceded his authority over the thirteen square kilometres of Porto Longone to the Spanish. This was the only case of territorial expansion in the history of the Presidi.

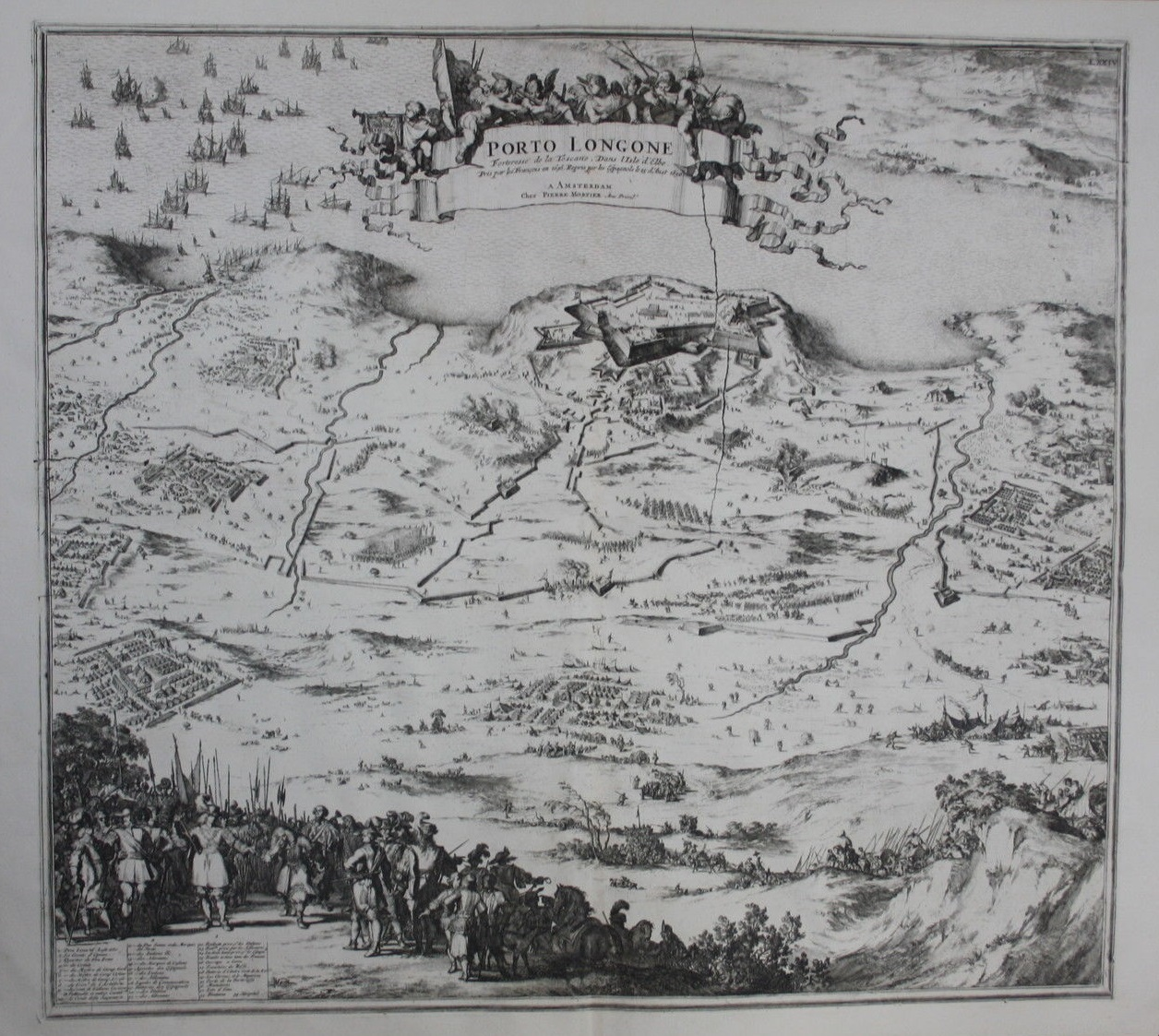
Siege of Porto Longone

From May to July 1646, Orbetello successfully resisted a siege by troops sent by the French royal minister Mazarin in an attempt to dislodge the Spaniards from Italy. However, French efforts to bring Grand Duke Ferdinand II of Tuscany out of his alliance with Spain failed. He refortified his own coast and raised a militia of 10,000 to observe the Franco-Spanish conflict across the border. In June, the Spanish gained a naval victory over the French off Porto Ercole. In September of the same year, after conquering Piombino, the French managed to capture Porto Longone. The Spanish garrison, which consisted of merely 80 men, held out for two weeks. The Spaniards recaptured both Piombino and Porto Longone during the summer of 1650, at a time when France was in the throes of the Fronde, a domestic uprising. Piombino fell quickly to a Neapolitan force, while Porto Longone, garrisoned by 1,500 Frenchmen, held out ten weeks. Because of subsequent pirate attacks and to defend against any future attacks by the French, the Spanish Crown decided to build another fortress on the bay of Longone: Fort Focardo.

Naples managed to meet this obligation, keeping the Tuscan fortresses fully garrisoned, even during the Messina War (1672–78) and the Nine Years' War (1688–97). At the start of the Messina revolt in 1672, the viceroy dispatched 4,600 infantry and 1,200 cavalry to the Presidi and in May 1677 his successor sent 300 men to strengthen the garrison at Porto Longone. In 1693, the year of heaviest fighting during the Nine Years' War, Neapolitan troops intended for the Catalonian front were instead sent to the Presidi in response to a French fleet.

In 1678, Grand Duke Cosimo III of Tuscany sought to take advantage of the Messina War to negotiate the purchase of the Presidi, or at least the exchange of Orbetello for Portoferraio. The latter, although belonging to Tuscany, was frequently used by French privateers. In 1695, during the Nine Years' War, the Republic of Genoa offered to buy the Presidi outright. The Spanish king Charles II refused both offers.

=== Austrian period (1708–1733) ===
During the War of the Spanish Succession, the Presidi were claimed by the Emperor Charles VI, who also claimed the Spanish throne. Between 1708 and 1712, he conquered all of them save Porto Longone. In Article 30 of the Treaty of Rastatt of 7 March 1714, France recognised Charles' claim, but no peace with Spain was forthcoming. The chief opponent of that peace was Elisabeth Farnese, queen of Philip V of Spain, who hoped to create an Italian principality for her son. In 1718, the Emperor, France, Great Britain and the Netherlands signed the Quadruple Alliance against Spain. Article 5 of the alliance proposed to grant to Elisabeth Farnese's eldest son, Don Carlos, the future Charles III of Spain, the Grand Duchy of Tuscany with Porto Longone when the ruling House of Medici died out, as it was soon expected to. (Note: It finally did when Grand Duke Gian Gastone died heirless on 9 July 1737.) This presumed that Philip V would formally renounced Porto Longone, which he held, and recognised it as an imperial fief like the other Presidi.

A final treaty of peace between Charles VI, who held the coastal Presidi, and Philip V, who retained Porto Longone, was not signed until the Treaty of Vienna of 30 April 1725. In this treaty, Charles agreed to enfeoff Don Carlos with the Duchy of Parma and Piacenza when he came of age. (Note: This was based on the assumption that his aged grand-uncle, Duke Antonio Farnese, would soon die; which he did in 1731.) The emperor would retain the coastal Presidi and Spain its rights in Piombino and Elba, including Porto Longone. In a draft treaty submitted by Spain on 5 April 1724, Philip would have received the return of the coastal Presidi (Article 4), but this demand was roundly mocked.

=== Bourbon period (1733–1801) ===
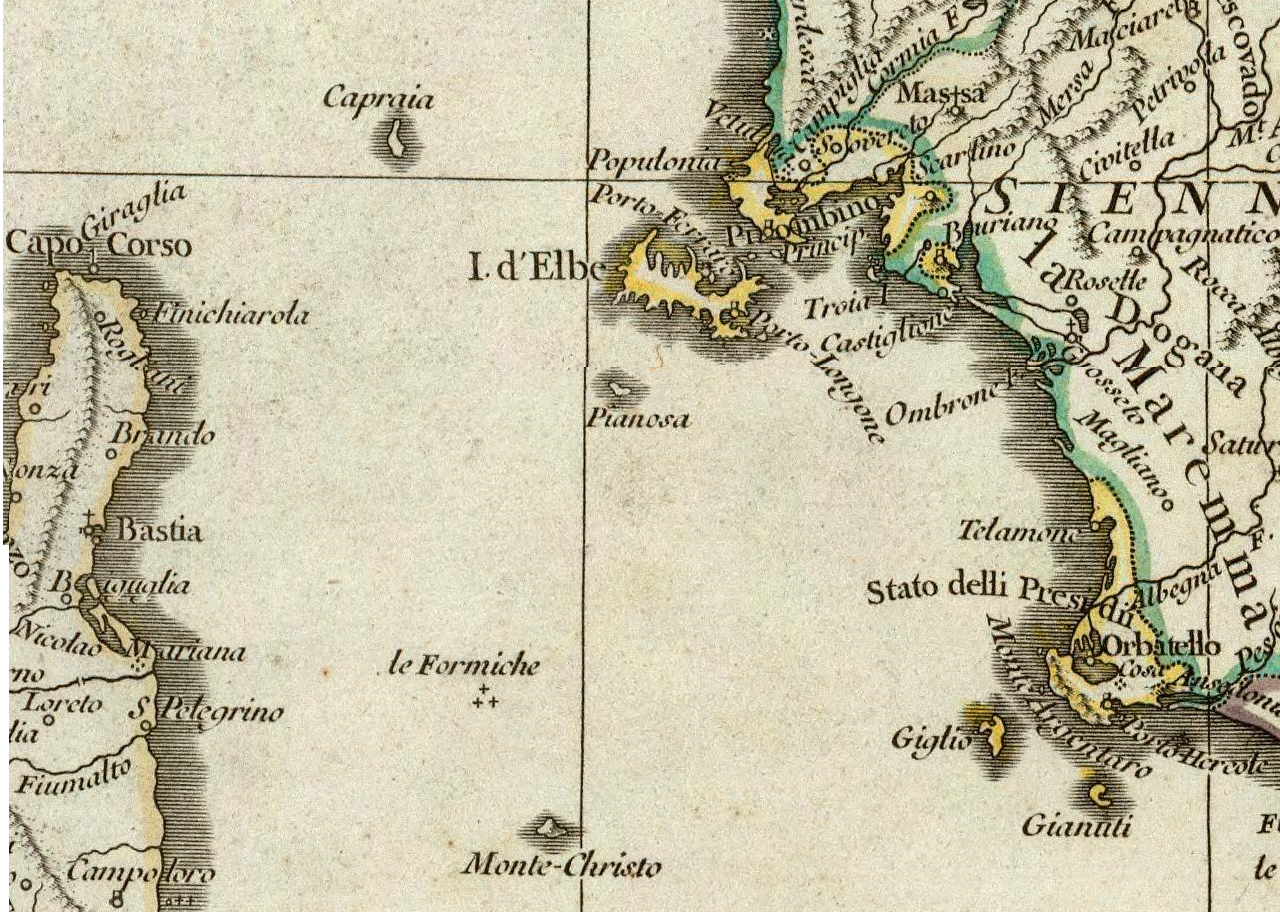
Map from 1743

This situation was revised in 1733 by the Treaty of Turin (26 September), in which France and Sardinia allied themselves against the Holy Roman Empire and agreed that Don Carlos should receive the Presidi together with the kingdoms of Naples and Sicily. Spain agreed to the same stipulations and joined the alliance against the emperor in the Treaty of El Escorial on 7 November. During the subsequent War of the Polish Succession in May 1735, a Spanish and allied army under the Duke of Montemar, the Duke of Noailles and the Duke of Savoy conquered the Presidi and the south Italian realms. A preliminary peace signed in Vienna in October 1735 confirmed these conquests to Don Carlos. On 11 December 1736, the emperor issued a diploma ceding the Presidi to him. This was finalised in the definitive Peace of Vienna of 18 November 1738, ratified by Spain at Versailles in 1739. In 1736, Carlos commissioned a work to demonstrate that the kings of Naples had sovereignty over the princes of Piombino. The result, the 120-page Dritto della Corona di Napoli sopra Piombino, (Note: In English, "Right of the Crown of Naples over Piombino".) was published around 1760.

On 21 March 1801, by the Convention of Aranjuez, France and Spain agreed to establish the Kingdom of Etruria out of the old Grand Duchy of Tuscany and to award it the Principality of Piombino, while allowing France to annex the Tuscan part of Elba (Portoferraio). This fulfillment of these terms depended on the agreement of Naples. On 28 March, following the defeat of his armies by the French during the War of the Second Coalition, King Ferdinand IV of Naples agreed, as part of the general settlement of the war, to cede the State of the Presidi, his rights on Elba (Porto Longone) and his claimed sovereignty over the Principality of Piombino to France on the understanding that they would be annexed to Tuscany to form the new Kingdom of Etruria. On 2 May, the French attempted to seize the Tuscan half of Elba, but the Tuscan garrison, with British assistance, resisted until the Treaty of Amiens of 25 March 1802 forced the British to evacuate. The formal cession of the Presidi to Etruria took place on 19 September 1801. Thereafter, its fate follows that of the rest of Tuscany. Piombino and Elba, however, remained under the French.

== Government and military ==
Under the Spanish, the Neapolitan treasury paid for the upkeep of the Presidi, rotating troops in and out and reinforcing the garrisons in times of danger. It normally maintained five infantry companies there. This was equivalent to one third of the Spanish forces deployed by Naples, which had 31 fortresses of its own. This emphasis on the Presidi was due to the primacy of France in Spanish defence planning. Under the viceroy, there were three governors (governatori): one commanding a company of infantry in Porto Ercole and two commanding a two companies of infantry each in Orbetello and Piombino. Prior to 1571, when the garrisons were increased, these last commanded only one company each.

The highest civil authority in the Presidi was the auditor (auditore), who was nominated by the viceroy. His task was the administration of civil and criminal justice. An inspector (veditore) was in charge of financing work on the fortifications and the wages of the garrisons, as well as supervising leaves of absence and supplying artillery and munitions. The inspector was assisted by a comptroller (scrivano di razione) and a payer (pagatore). A harbourmaster (mastro portolano) was in charge of the ports and collecting duties on imports and exports, but he was only occasionally resident in Orbetello. His functions were often performed by a contractor (arrendatore).

== Bibliography ==
- Abulafia, David (2010). "The Mouse and the Elephant: Relations between the Kings of Naples and the Lordship of Piombino in the Fifteenth Century". In Paton, Bernadette; Law, John Easton (eds.). Communes and Despots in Medieval and Renaissance Italy. Ashgate. pp. 145–60.
- Alcalá-Zamora y Queipo de Llano, J. (1976). "Razón de estado y geoestrategia en la política italiana de Carlos II: Florencia y los presidios, 1677–1681". Boletín de la Real Academia de la Historia. 173: 297–358.
- Angiolini, Franco (2006). "I presidios di Toscana: cadena de oro e llave y freno de Italia". In García Hernán, Enrique; Maffi, Davide (eds.). Guerra y sociedad en la monarquía hispánica: política, estrategia y cultura en la Europa moderna (1500–1700). Vol. 1. pp. 171–88.
- Armstrong, Edward (1909). "The Bourbon Governments in France and Spain II (1727–46)". In Ward, A. W.; Prothero, G. W.; Leathes, Stanley (eds.). The Cambridge Modern History, Volume VI: The Eighteenth Century. Cambridge University Press. pp. 145–67.
- Astarita, Tommaso (2006). Between Salt Water and Holy Water: A History of Southern Italy. W. W. Norton and Company.
- Berte-Langereau, Jack (1955). "L'Espagne et le royaume d'Etrurie". Hispania. 15 (60): 353–460.
- Braudel, Fernand (1995) [1966]. The Mediterranean and the Mediterranean World in the Age of Philip II, Volume 1. University of California Press.
- Caciagli, Giuseppe (1992). Lo Stato dei Presidi. Pontedera: Arnera.
- Corretti, Alessandro (2012). "Le fortezze d'altura dell'isola d'Elba: lo stato della questione". Aristonothos: Scritti per il Mediterraneo antico. 5: 347–70.
- Demaria, Giacinto (1898). "La Guerra di Castro, e la Spedizione de' Presidii (1639–1649)". Miscellanea di Storia Italiana. Series 3. 4: 191–256.
- Dhondt, Frederik (2015). Balance of Power and Norm Hierarchy: Franco-British Diplomacy after the Peace of Utrecht. Leiden: Brill.
- Hanlon, Gregory (2002). The Twilight of a Military Tradition: Italian Aristocrats and European Conflicts, 1560–1800. Taylor and Francis.
- Mallett, Michael; Shaw, Christine (2012). The Italian Wars, 1494–1559. Pearson Education.
- Marino, John A. (2007). "The Rural World in Italy under Spanish Rule". In Thomas James Dandelet; John A. Marino (eds.). Spain in Italy: Politics, Society, and Religion 1500–1700. Leiden: Brill. pp. 405–32.
- Martin, Miguel A. (1976). "The Secret Clause: Britain and Spanish Ambitions in Italy 1712–31". European History Quarterly. 6: 407–25. doi:10.1177/026569147600600401.
- Martinelli, Simone (2006). "L'arsenale bellico dei presidi spagnoli di Toscana nella seconda metà del Cinquecento" (PDF). Rivista di storia finanziaria. 17: 89–108.
- Maunder, Samuel (1860). Inman, John (ed.). The History of the World, Volume II. New York: Henry Bill.
- Menning, Ralph (1995). "Stato dei Presidi". In Frey, Linda; Frey, Marsha (eds.). The Treaties of the War of the Spanish Succession: An Historical and Critical Dictionary. Greenwood Publishing Group. pp. 421–22. ISBN 978-0-313-27884-6.
- Paoletti, Ciro (2012). "Italy, Piedmont and French Anti-Habsburg Strategy, 1690–1748". In Schneid, Frederick C. (ed.). The Projection and Limitations of Imperial Powers, 1618–1850. Leiden: Brill. pp. 68–82.
- Romero García, Eladi (1986). "El señorío de Piombino: Un ejemplo de influencia institucional hispánica en la Italia del siglo XVI". Hispania. 46 (164): 503–18.
- Sabatini, Gaetano (2013). "Economy and Finance in Early Modern Naples". In Tommaso Astarita (ed.). A Companion to Early Modern Naples. Leiden: Brill. pp. 89–108.
- Storrs, Christopher (2006). The Resilience of the Spanish Monarchy 1665–1700. Oxford University Press.
