= Laguna di Orbetello =

Lake in Tuscany, Italy

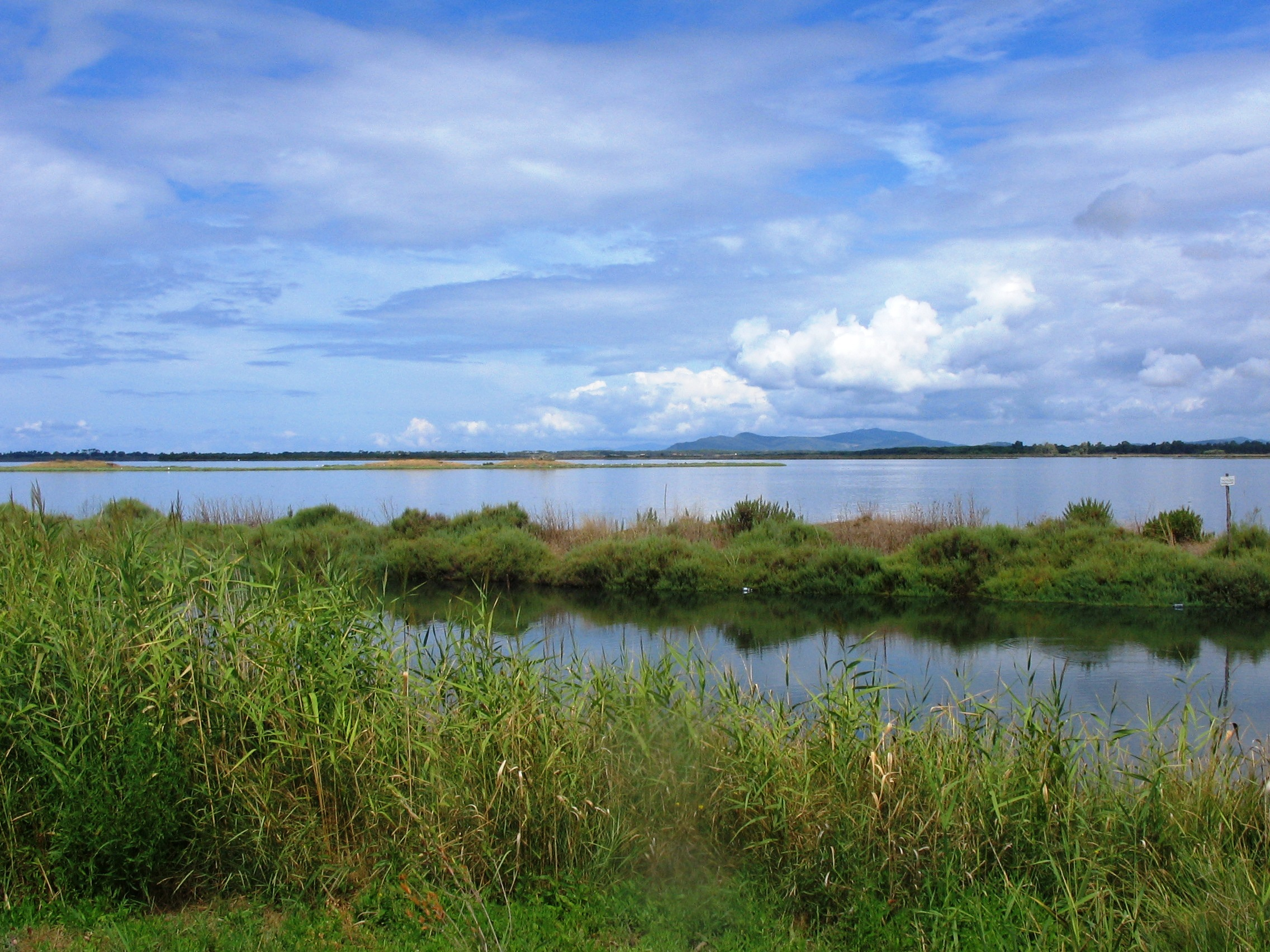

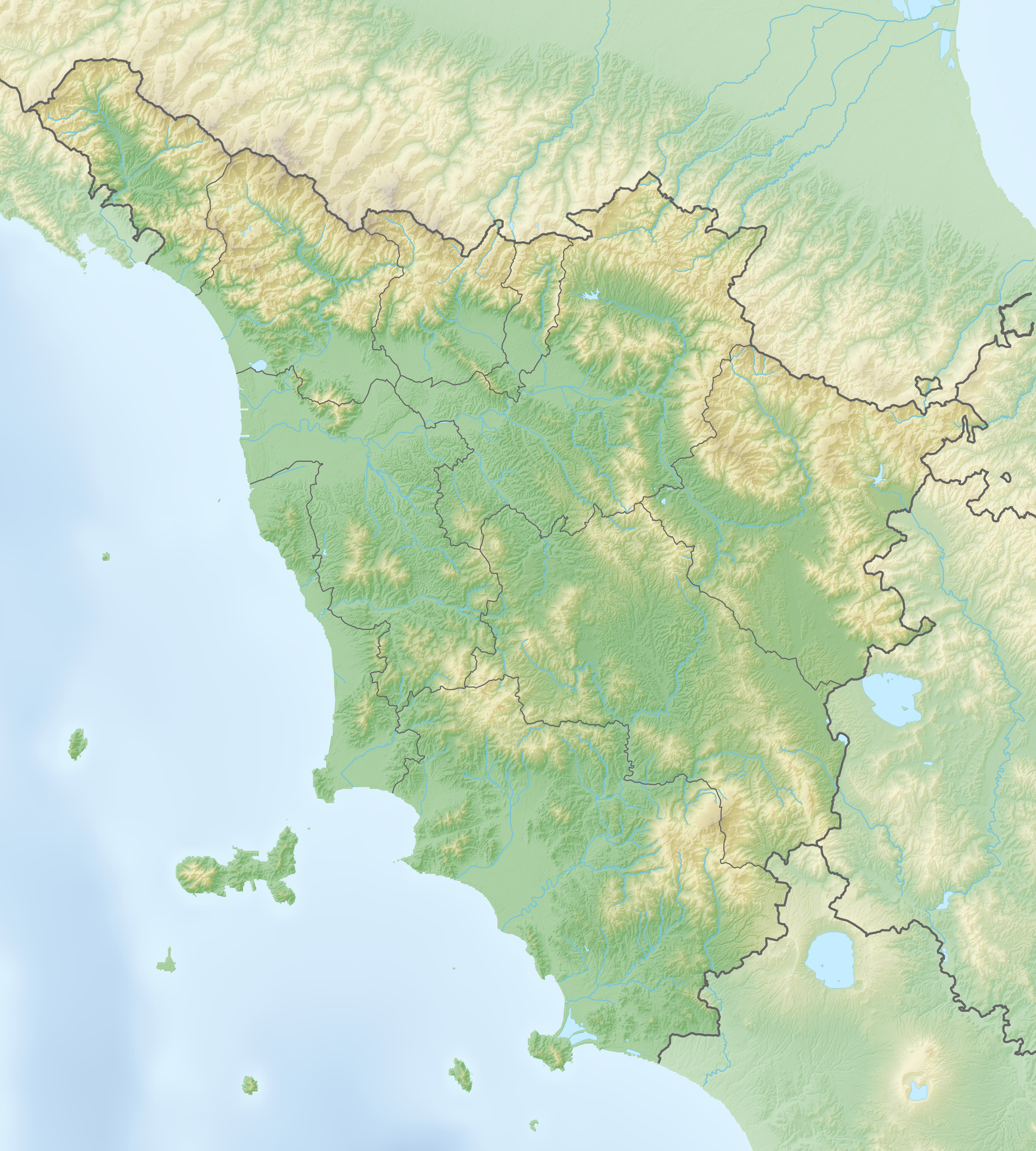
- Location within Tuscany
- Location: Province of Grosseto, Tuscany
- Coordinates: 42°26′15.10″N 11°11′38.70″E
- Basin countries: Italy
- Surface area: 26.9 km^{2} (10.4 sq mi)
- Surface elevation: 1 m (3 ft 3 in)

Ramsar Wetland
- Official name: Laguna di Orbetello
- Designated: 14 December 1976
- Reference no.: 124

Laguna di Orbetello is a lake in the Province of Grosseto, Tuscany, Italy. At an elevation of 1 m, its surface area is 26.9 km^{2}.

== Overview ==
It is separated from the Tyrrhenian Sea by two tombolos (Giannella in the north and Feniglia in the south) that join the promontory of Monte Argentario to continental territory. In the middle of the lagoon, on another land strip, is located the town of Orbetello.

== See also ==
- Orbetello Airfield
- Porto Ercole
- Porto Santo Stefano
