= Gaius Atilius Regulus =

Gaius Atilius Regulus may refer to:

- Gaius Atilius Regulus (consul 257 BC)
- Gaius Atilius Regulus (consul 225 BC)
