= Talamone railway station =

Railway station in Italy

Talamone
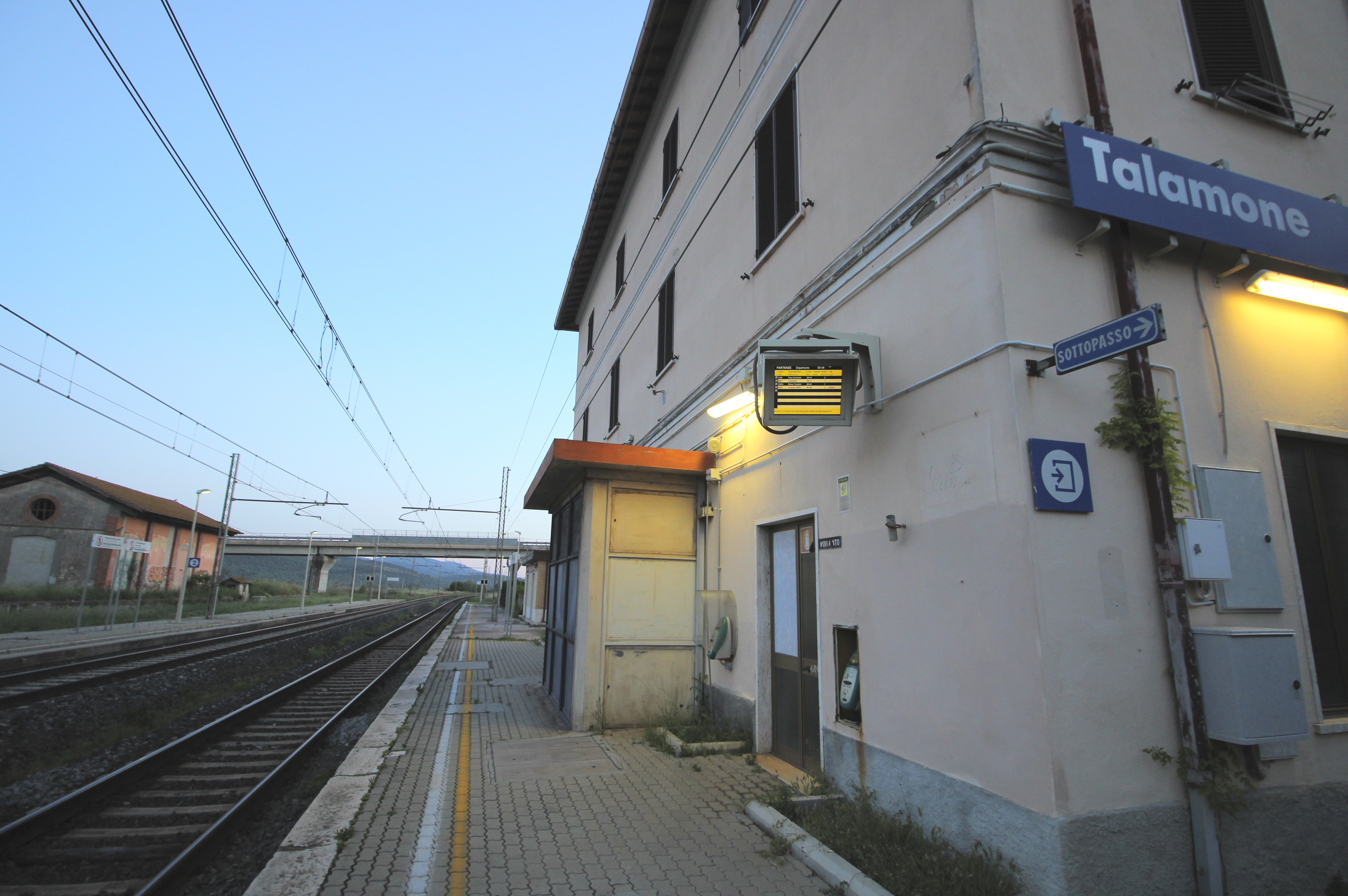

General information
- Location: Via dei Fiori; Fonteblanda 58015; Orbetello, Grosseto, Tuscany; Italy
- Coordinates: 42°33′53″N 11°09′53″E
- Operator: Rete Ferroviaria Italiana; Trenitalia
- Line: Tirrenica
- Tracks: 2

Other information
- Classification: Bronze

History
- Opened: 15 June 1864; 162 years ago
Location
- Location within Tuscany Location within Italy

Talamone railway station is an Italian railway station on the Tirrenica railway line, located in the town of Fonteblanda, in the municipality of Orbetello, Province of Grosseto, Tuscany. The station also serves the nearby tourist destination of Talamone, from which it gets its name.

== History ==
The station opened on 15 June 1864 along with the section of the Pisa–Rome railway from Follonica to Orbetello.

== Train services and movements ==
Regular passenger services to the station consist of regionale and regionale veloce services, which run frequently to Grosseto, Pisa Centrale, Roma Termini, Orbetello and Florence SMN.

== See also ==
- History of rail transport in Italy
- List of railway stations in Tuscany
- Rail transport in Italy
- Railway stations in Italy
