= Fonteblanda =

- Frazione
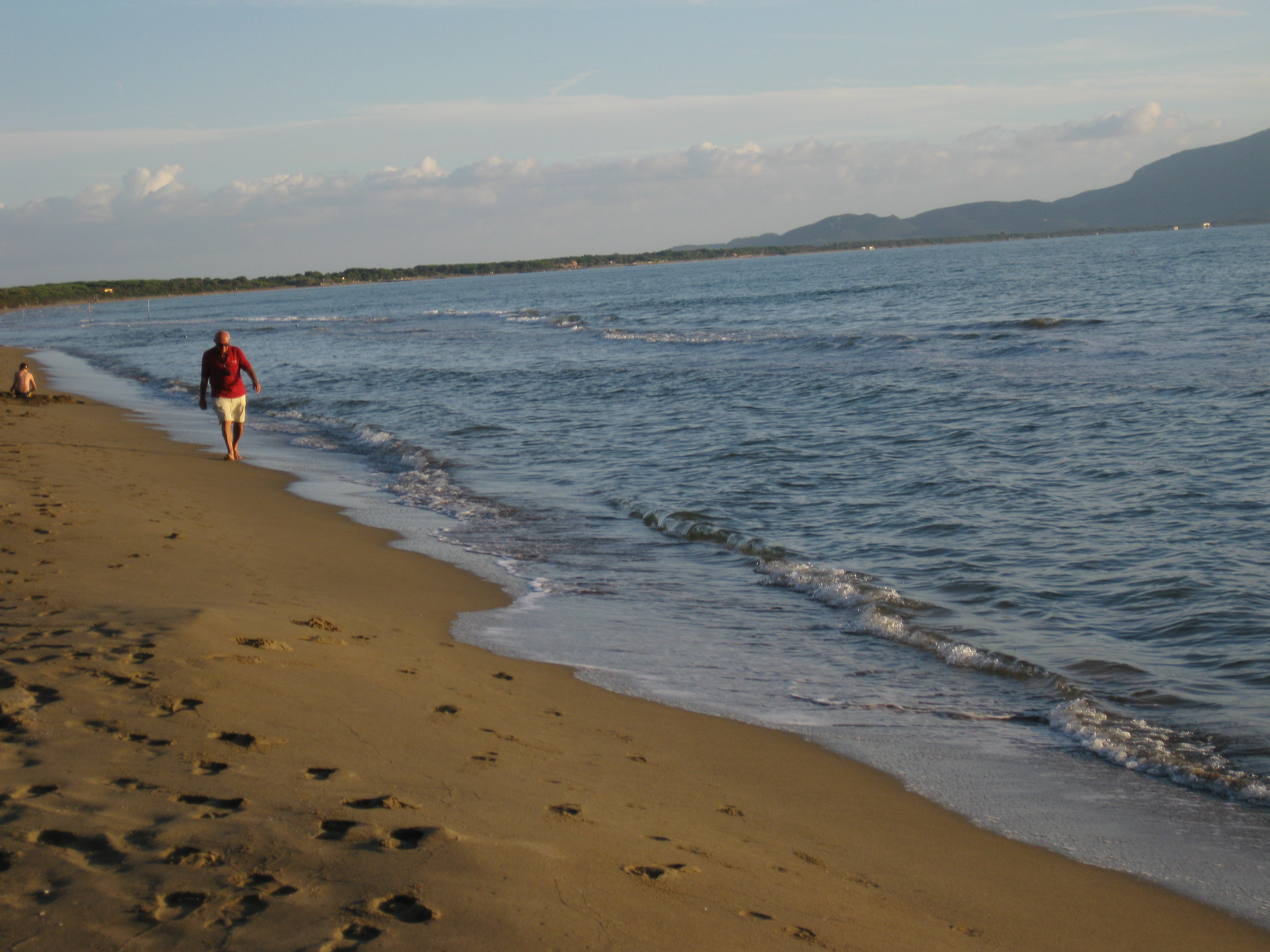
- A beach in Fonteblanda

- Location of Fonteblanda in Italy
- Coordinates: 42°34′N 11°10′E
- Country: Italy
- Region: Tuscany
- Province: Grosseto (GR)
- Comune: Orbetello
- Elevation: 13 m (43 ft)

Population (2011)
  - Total: 1,088
- Demonym: Fonteblandini
- Time zone: UTC+1 (CET)
  - Summer (DST): UTC+2 (CEST)
- Postal code: 58015
- Dialing code: (+39) 0564

Fonteblanda is a village in Tuscany, central Italy, administratively a frazione of the comune of Orbetello, province of Grosseto, in the Tuscan Maremma. At the time of the 2001 census its population amounted to 904.

Fonteblanda is easily reached from Via Aurelia, and is about 25 km from Grosseto and 10 km from Orbetello.

== Main sights ==
- Santa Maria Goretti, main parish church in the village, it was designed by engineer Ernesto Ganelli in 1950 and consecrated in 1980.
- Santa Maria dell'Osa, notable contemporary architecture designed by architect Ico Parisi in 1963.
- Poggio Talamonaccio: an Etruscan archaeological site.

== Transports ==
- Talamone railway station: despite its name, it is located in Fonteblanda.

== See also ==
- Albinia
- Ansedonia
- Giannella
- San Donato, Orbetello
- Talamone
