= Albinia =

- Frazione
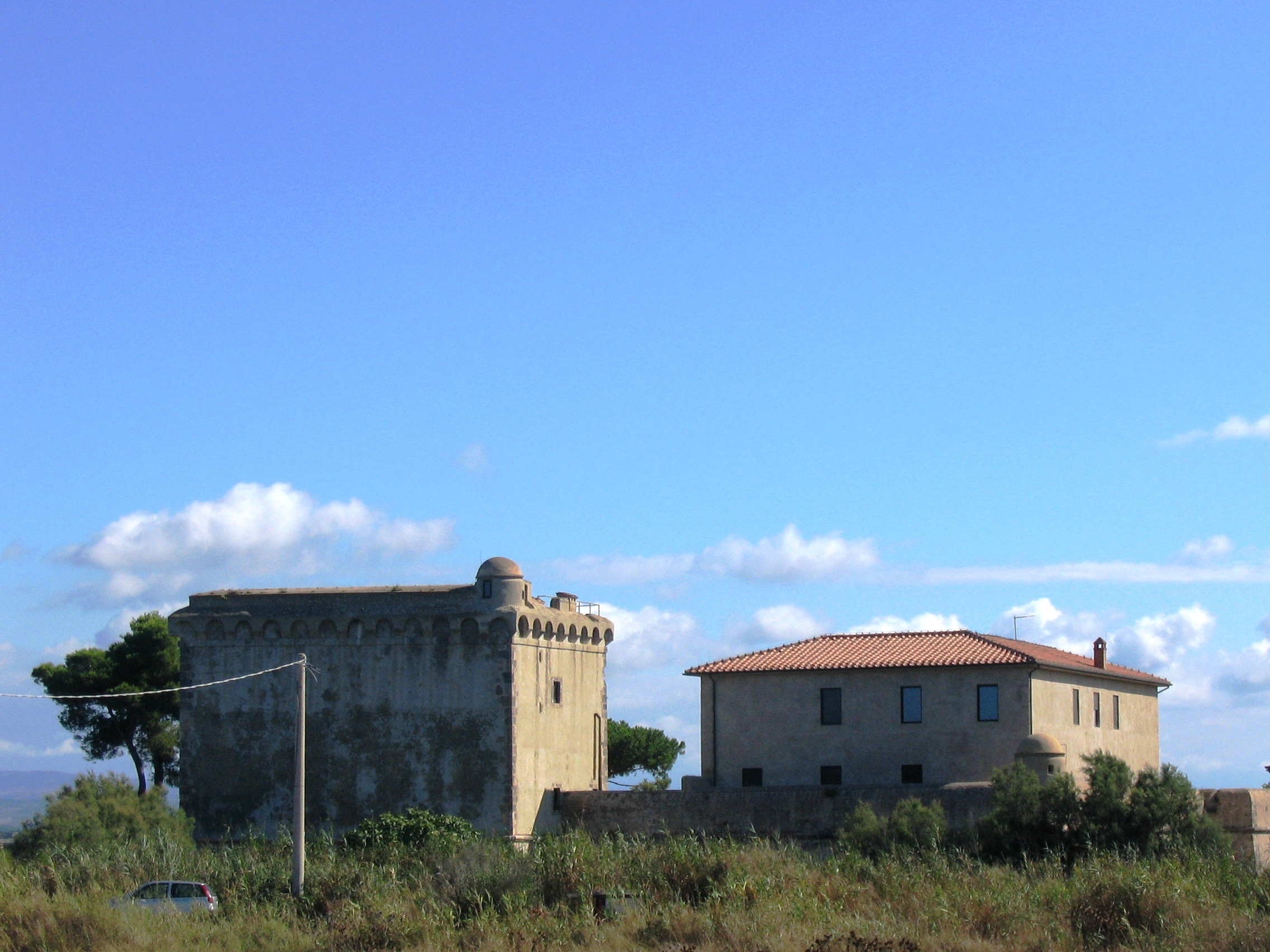
- The Salt Fortress in Albinia

- Location of Albinia in Italy
- Coordinates: 42°30′08″N 11°12′29″E
- Country: Italy
- Region: Tuscany
- Province: Grosseto (GR)
- Comune: Orbetello
- Elevation: 2 m (6.6 ft)

Population (2011)
  - Total: 2,926
- Demonym: Albiniesi
- Time zone: UTC+1 (CET)
  - Summer (DST): UTC+2 (CEST)
- Postal code: 58010
- Dialing code: (+39) 0564

Albinia is a town in Tuscany, central Italy, administratively a frazione of the comune of Orbetello, province of Grosseto, in the Tuscan Maremma. At the time of the 2001 census its population amounted to 2,567 and it is the most populous hamlet in Orbetello municipality.

Albinia is easily reached from Via Aurelia - it's about 33 km from Grosseto and 10 km from Orbetello - and from the Pisa-Grosseto-Rome railway thanks to its own station.

== Main sights ==
- Santa Maria delle Grazie, main parish church in the village, it was designed by engineer Ernesto Ganelli and consecrated in 1957.
- Torre delle Saline (Salt Fortress), built by the Republic of Siena in 14th century and fortified by the Spanish in 1630.

== Transports ==
- Albinia railway station

== See also ==
- Ansedonia
- Fonteblanda
- Giannella
- San Donato, Orbetello
- Talamone
