= Iolaidas of Argos =

Iolaidas of Argos was an ancient Greek athlete listed by Eusebius of Caesarea as a victor in the stadion race of the 139th Olympiad (224 BC). He was the second winner from Argos in the category. His victory occurred at the height of the Cleomenean War, probably only a few weeks after Argos had been recaptured by the Achaean League with the aid of Antigonus III Doson of Macedon.

== See also ==
- Olympic winners of the Stadion race
