= Ansedonia =

Subdivision of the municipality of Orbetello, Italy

- Frazione
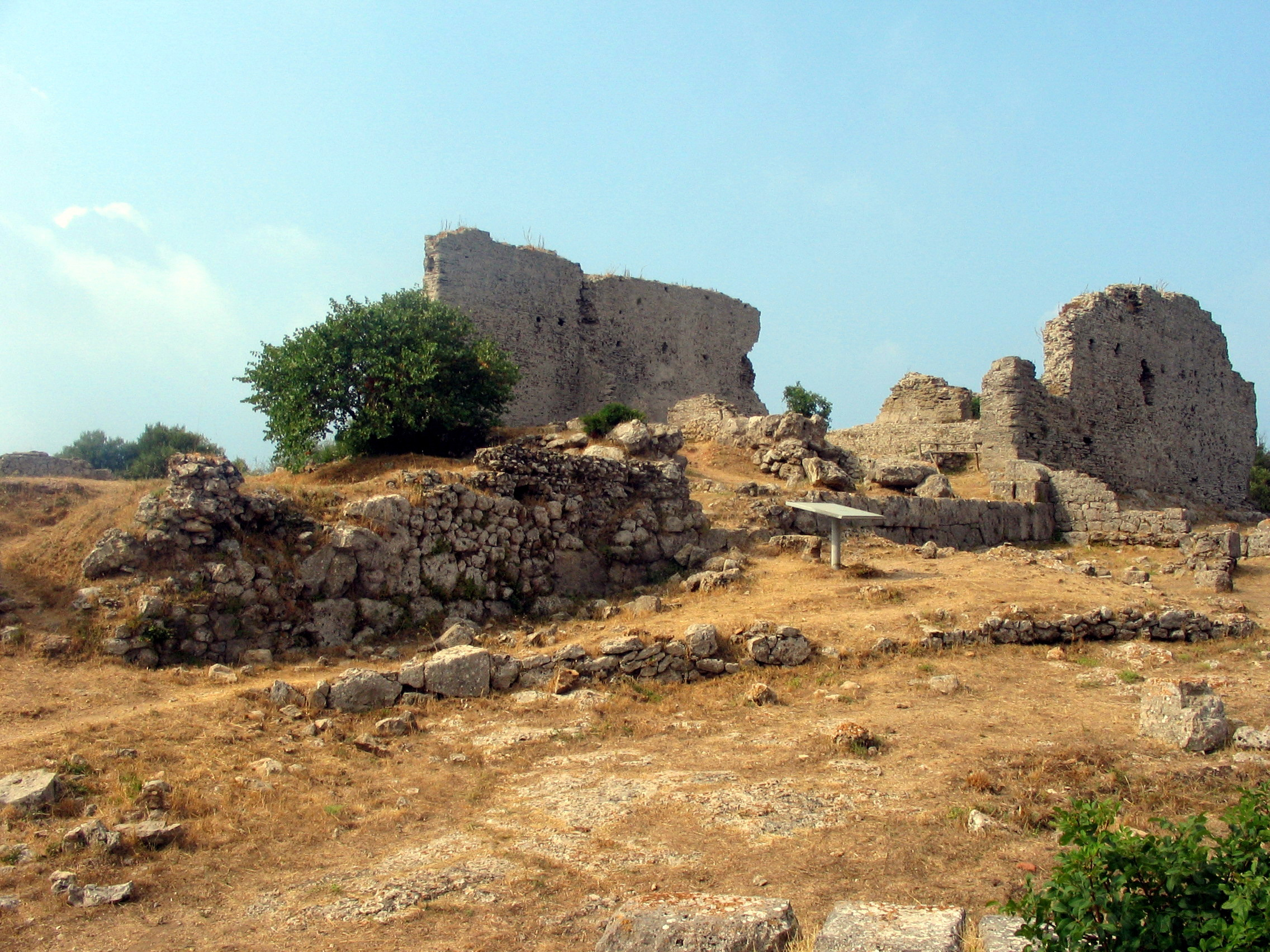
- The ruins of Cosa

- Location of Ansedonia in Italy
- Coordinates: 42°24′38″N 11°17′19″E
- Country: Italy
- Region: Tuscany
- Province: Grosseto (GR)
- Comune: Orbetello
- Elevation: 13 m (43 ft)

Population (2011)
  - Total: 116
- Time zone: UTC+1 (CET)
  - Summer (DST): UTC+2 (CEST)
- Postal code: 58015
- Dialing code: (+39) 0564

Ansedonia is a frazione of the comune of Orbetello, in the province of Grosseto, southern Tuscany (Italy). At the time of the 2001 census, its population was 88.

It is a renowned tourist resort. The village lies near the ruins of the ancient Roman town of Cosa.

== Geography ==
Ansedonia is situated approximately 42 kilometres (26 mi) from Grosseto in a straight line, and the straight line distance for Ansedonia to Rome is 114 kilometres (71 mi).

== Transport ==
The village of Ansedonia was served by its own railway station, which was opened in 1950 on the section of the Pisa–Rome railway between Orbetello and Capalbio, under the management of the former Azienda autonoma delle Ferrovie dello Stato (State Railways Autonomous Company).

== See also ==
- Albinia
- Fonteblanda
- Giannella
- San Donato, Orbetello
- Talamone
