= Albinia railway station =

Railway station in Italy

Albinia
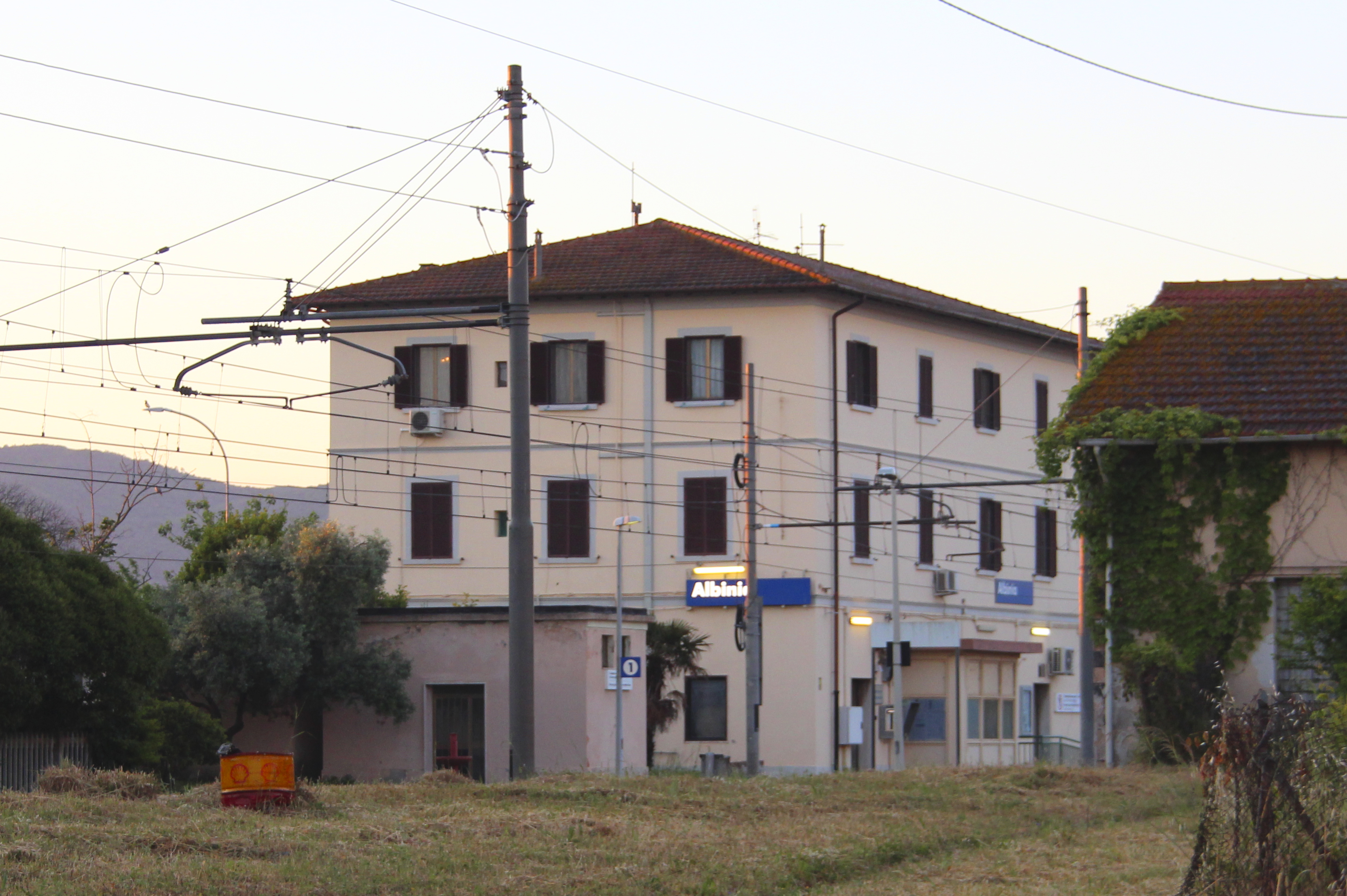

General information
- Location: Via della Stazione; Albinia 58015; Orbetello, Grosseto, Tuscany; Italy
- Coordinates: 42°30′08″N 11°12′42″E
- Operator: Rete Ferroviaria Italiana; Trenitalia
- Line: Tirrenica
- Tracks: 3

Other information
- Classification: Silver

History
- Opened: 15 June 1864; 162 years ago
Location
- Location within Tuscany Location within Italy

Albinia railway station is an Italian railway station on the Tirrenica railway line, located in the town of Albinia, in the municipality of Orbetello, Province of Grosseto, Tuscany.

== History ==
The station opened on 15 June 1864 along with the section of the Pisa–Rome railway from Follonica to Orbetello. Initially named Albegna, as it is located near the mouth of the river of the same name, it was renamed Albinia in 1926.

== Train services and movements ==
Regular passenger services to the station consist of regionale and regionale veloce services, which run frequently to Grosseto, Pisa Centrale, Roma Termini, Campiglia Marittima and Florence SMN.

== See also ==
- History of rail transport in Italy
- List of railway stations in Tuscany
- Rail transport in Italy
- Railway stations in Italy
