= Aneroëstes =

Gaulish mercenary leader

Aneroëstes (Greek Ἀνηροέστης) (died 225 BC) was one of the two leaders of the Gaesatae, a group of Gaulish mercenaries who lived in the Alps near the Rhône and fought against the Roman Republic in the Battle of Telamon of 225 BC. He and his colleague Concolitanus were hired by the Boii and Insubres in response to the Roman colonisation of the formerly Gallic region of Picenum. After some initial success in Etruria, when faced with the army of the consul Lucius Aemilius Papus, Aneroëstes persuaded the Gauls to withdraw, but they were cut off at Telamon (modern Talamone, Tuscany) by the other consul, Gaius Atilius Regulus, and forced to fight a pitched battle.

The Gaesatae fought at the front, naked apart from their weapons, but their small shields offered little protection against Roman javelins. The Gaesatae were forced back and their allies slaughtered. Colcolitanus was captured. Aneroëstes escaped with a small group of followers, who took their own lives.
