= San Donato, Orbetello =

San Donato
- Frazione
- Location of San Donato in Italy
- Coordinates: 42°33′11″N 11°14′26″E
- Country: Italy
- Region: Tuscany
- Province: Grosseto (GR)
- Comune: Orbetello
- Elevation: 33 m (108 ft)

Population (2011)
  - Total: 18
- Demonym: Sandonatesi
- Time zone: UTC+1 (CET)
  - Summer (DST): UTC+2 (CEST)
- Postal code: 58010
- Dialing code: (+39) 0564

San Donato is a village in Tuscany, central Italy, administratively a frazione of the comune of Orbetello, province of Grosseto, in the Tuscan Maremma. At the time of the 2011 census its population amounted to 18.

San Donato is about 30 km from Grosseto and 15 km from Orbetello. The village was founded in the late 1950s as a result of the riforma fondiaria (land reform) in Maremma. It is divided into the hamlets of San Donato Centro and San Donato Vecchio.

It is known for the Sagra della Panzanella, a festival held every summer since 1999 to celebrate the Tuscan dish panzanella.

== Main sights ==
- San Donato, main parish church in the village, it was designed by engineer Ernesto Ganelli and consecrated in 1961.
- Etruscan archaeological sites of San Donato Centro, San Giovanni, Volta di Rote and Doganella.

== People ==
- Felice Andreis (1907–2015)

== Bibliography ==
- Giuseppe Guerrini (1994). Fattorie e paesaggio agrario nel grossetano nel primo Novecento. Roccastrada: Il mio amico.
- Antonio Valentino Simoncelli (1989). La Riforma Fondiaria in Maremma (1950-1965). Grosseto.
- Enrico Crispolti; Anna Mazzanti; Luca Quattrocchi (2005). Arte in Maremma nella prima metà del Novecento. Milan: Silvana Editoriale. p. 344.

== See also ==
- Albinia
- Ansedonia
- Fonteblanda
- Giannella
- Talamone
