= Talamone Lighthouse =

Talamone
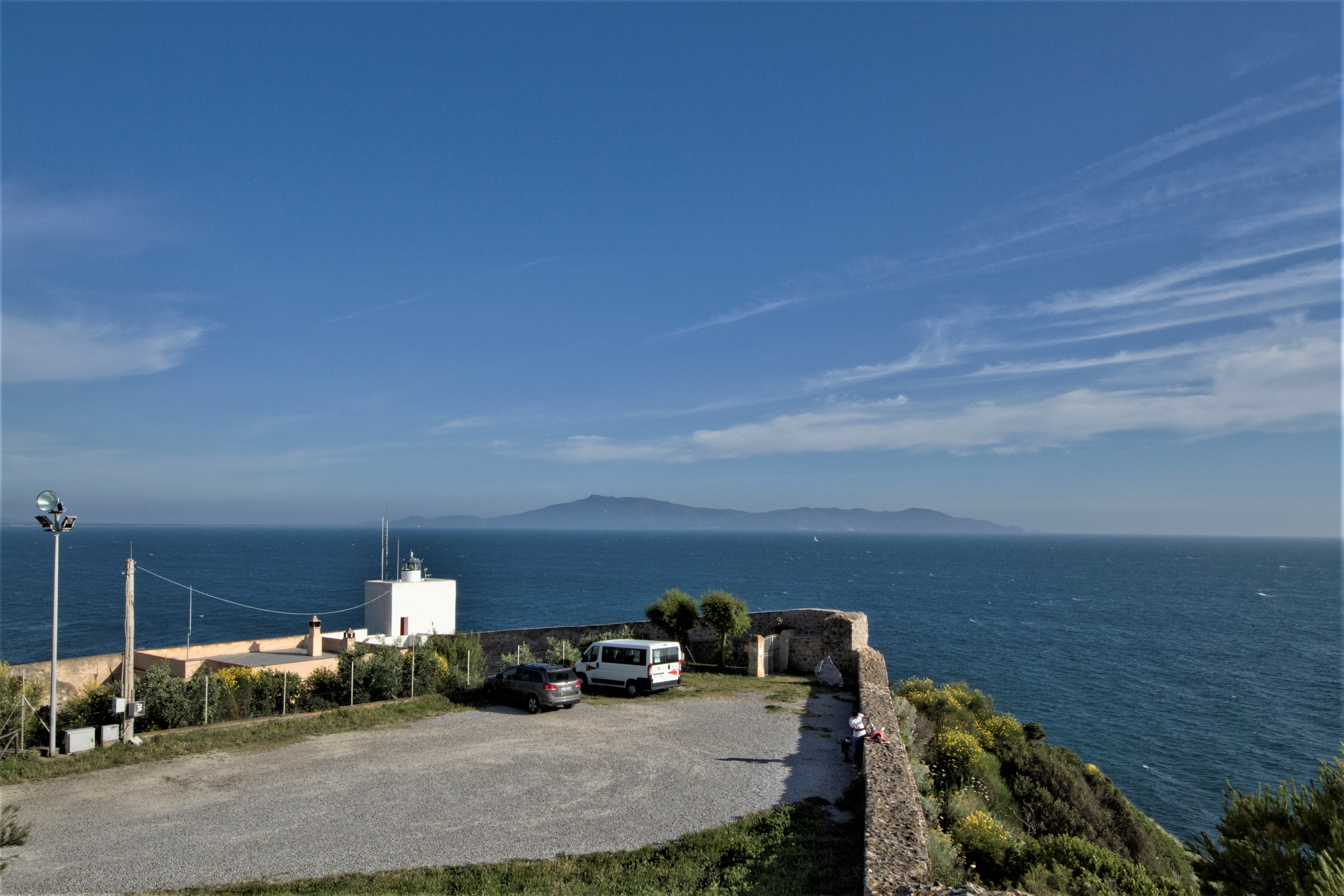
- Talamone Lighthouse
- Location: Talamone; Tuscany; Italy
- Coordinates: 42°33′06″N 11°08′02″E

Tower
- Constructed: 1865 (established)
- Foundation: stone base
- Construction: masonry tower
- Height: 18 metres (59 ft)
- Shape: quadrangular tower with lantern and balcony
- Markings: white tower, grey metallic lantern dome
- Power source: mains electricity
- Operator: Marina Militare

Light
- First lit: 1947 (rebuilt)
- Focal height: 30 metres (98 ft)
- Lens: Type TD; Focal length: 187,5 mm
- Intensity: main: AL 1000 W reserve: LABI 100 W
- Range: main: 15 nautical miles (28 km; 17 mi) reserve: 11 nautical miles (20 km; 13 mi)
- Characteristic: Fl (2) W 10s.
- Italy no.: 2140 E.F

Talamone Lighthouse (Italian: Faro di Talamone) is an active lighthouse, located on the southern tip of the rocky promontory of Talamone in the Tuscan Maremma on the Tyrrhenian Sea.

== Description ==
The lighthouse, built in 1865, reconstructed in 1947 after being destroyed during World War II, consists of a white masonry quadrangular tower 18 metres (59 ft) high with balcony. The tower is attached to the southern seaside bastion of the fortress built by Aldobrandeschi in the 13th century. The white lantern is placed on the top of the tower and the lantern roof is painted grey metallic.

The light is positioned at 30 metres (98 ft) above sea level and emits two white flashes in a 10 seconds period, visible up to a distance of 15 nautical miles (28 km; 17 mi). The lighthouse is completely automated and managed by Marina Militare with the identification code number 2140 E.F.; the former keeper's house has been given in use to the Circolo della Vela Talamone.

== See also ==
- List of lighthouses in Italy
