= Concolitanus =

Gaulish mercenary leader

Concolitanus (Gaulish: "the one with big heels") was one of the two leaders of the Gaesatae, a group of Gaulish mercenaries who lived in the Alps near the Rhône and fought against the Roman Republic in the Battle of Telamon of 225 BC. He and his colleague Aneroëstes were hired by the Boii and Insubres in response to the Roman colonisation of the formerly Gallic region of Picenum. He was captured after the defeat at Telamon (modern Talamone, Tuscany). Aneroëstes escaped with a small group of followers and committed suicide.
