= Marcus Valerius Messalla (consul 226 BC) =

Marcus Valerius Messalla was a Roman Republic consul in 226 BC.

Messalla was probably the son of Manius Valerius Maximus Corvinus Messalla. His year of office was employed in organising a general levy of the Italian nations against an expected invasion of the Gauls from both sides of the Alps (Zonar, viii. 19; Oros. iv. 13; Fasti; comp. Polyb. ii. 23).

Preceded by Publius Valerius Flaccus and Marcus Atilius Regulus	Consul of the Roman Republic with Lucius Apustius Fullo; 226 BC	Succeeded by Lucius Aemilius Papus and Gaius Atilius Regulus
