= Gaesatae =

Gallic mercenary warriors

The Gaesatae or Gaesati (Latin Gaesati, Greek Γαισάται) were a group of Gallic mercenary warriors who lived in Transalpine regions and near the river Rhône in the 3rd century BC. They fought against the Roman Republic at the Battle of Telamon in 225 BC, and later in 221 BC.

Polybius and Plutarch describe the Gaesatae as mercenaries called in from Transalpine regions by the Insubres and the Boii, who enticed them with promises of considerable plunder. They disappear from historical accounts after the campaigns in Cisalpine Gaul, around the time the Allobroges begin to appear in the records. Although no ancient author establishes a direct link between the two groups, some scholars have postulated that the Allobroges may be identified as descendants of Gaesatae.

Apart from these references in the context of the invasions, the Gaesatae are seldom mentioned. Strabo and the late Suda lexicon are among the few to treat them as a distinct people instead of a group of warriors. However, most scholars theorize that the Gaesatae were not a single ethnic group but rather bands of Gaulish warriors, often from mountainous or less fertile regions, who hired themselves out for warfare. Their leaders, referred to as 'kings' by Greek authors (using the term basileus), appear mostly as war chiefs motivated by the prospect of spoils.

== Etymology and name ==
The name Gaisatai literally means '(armed) with javelins' or 'spearmen'. It derives from the Gaulish noun *gaisos, meaning 'spear, javelin', attested in latin as gaesum. Ancient Greek historian Polybius interpreted Gaisatai as meaning 'mercenaries', writing: "[they] called Gaesatae because they serve for hire, this being the proper meaning of the word". This translation is widely rejected by modern linguists.

The name is cognate with the Old Irish gaiscedach ('armed person, warrior, champion'), from gaisced ('weapons, arms'), itself from gáe ('spear, javelin'). The stem gaisat- can also be found in the Gaulish proper nouns Gaesatus, Gesatus, Gesatius, or Gesatia, as well as in the compound Gesato-rix, meaning 'king-spear', or 'king-javelin'.

== History ==
=== Ancient accounts ===
According to Polybius' account, the Boii and Insubres of Cisalpine Gaul paid the Gaesatae, under their leaders Concolitanus and Aneroëstes, large sums of money to fight against the Romans, in response to the Roman colonisation of the former Gallic territory of Picenum. The Gauls overran and defeated a Roman army on the approach to Rome, but when the consul Lucius Aemilius Papus arrived with his troops, the Gauls followed Aneroëstes' advice to withdraw with their booty. Papus pursued them, and the other consul Gaius Atilius Regulus cut them off at Telamon in Etruria.

Polybius describes how the Gaesatae fought at the front, and unlike their Gallic allies who fought in trousers and light cloaks, they went into battle naked, both because of their great confidence and their desire not to get their clothes caught in the brambles. Diodorus Siculus also reports that some Gauls fought naked, trusting in the protection of nature. The appearance and the gestures of the naked warriors in front, 8 all in the prime of life, and finely built men, and all in the leading companies richly adorned with gold torques and armlets. The sight of them indeed dismayed the Romans, but at the same time the prospect of winning such spoils made them twice as keen for the fight, but their small shields offered little protection against Roman javelins, and the Gaesatae were driven back and their allies slaughtered. Concolitanus was captured. Aneroëstes escaped with a few followers and killed himself. In 222 BC the Gaesatae were hired again, but the Gallic forces were defeated by the Roman cavalry at Clastidium in the territory of the Insubres. According to Plutarch, in his Life of Marcellus, the Gaesatae numbered 30,000 as they crossed the Alps, of whom 10,000 fought at Clastidium.

=== Legacy ===
According to some scholars, the Gaesatae may be identified as precursors of the Allobroges, a Gallic people who first appeared in the same region only a few years later, in connection with Hannibal's crossing of the Alps in 218 BC.

James MacKillop has compared the ancient Gaesatae with the medieval Irish fianna, who were mythical small war-bands of landless young men operating independently of any kingdom. According to him, "Irish chronicles indicate that the first fianna were approximately contemporary with the gaesatae, as when they protected the ard rí [high king] Fiachach."
