= Orbetello =

- Comune
- Comune di Orbetello
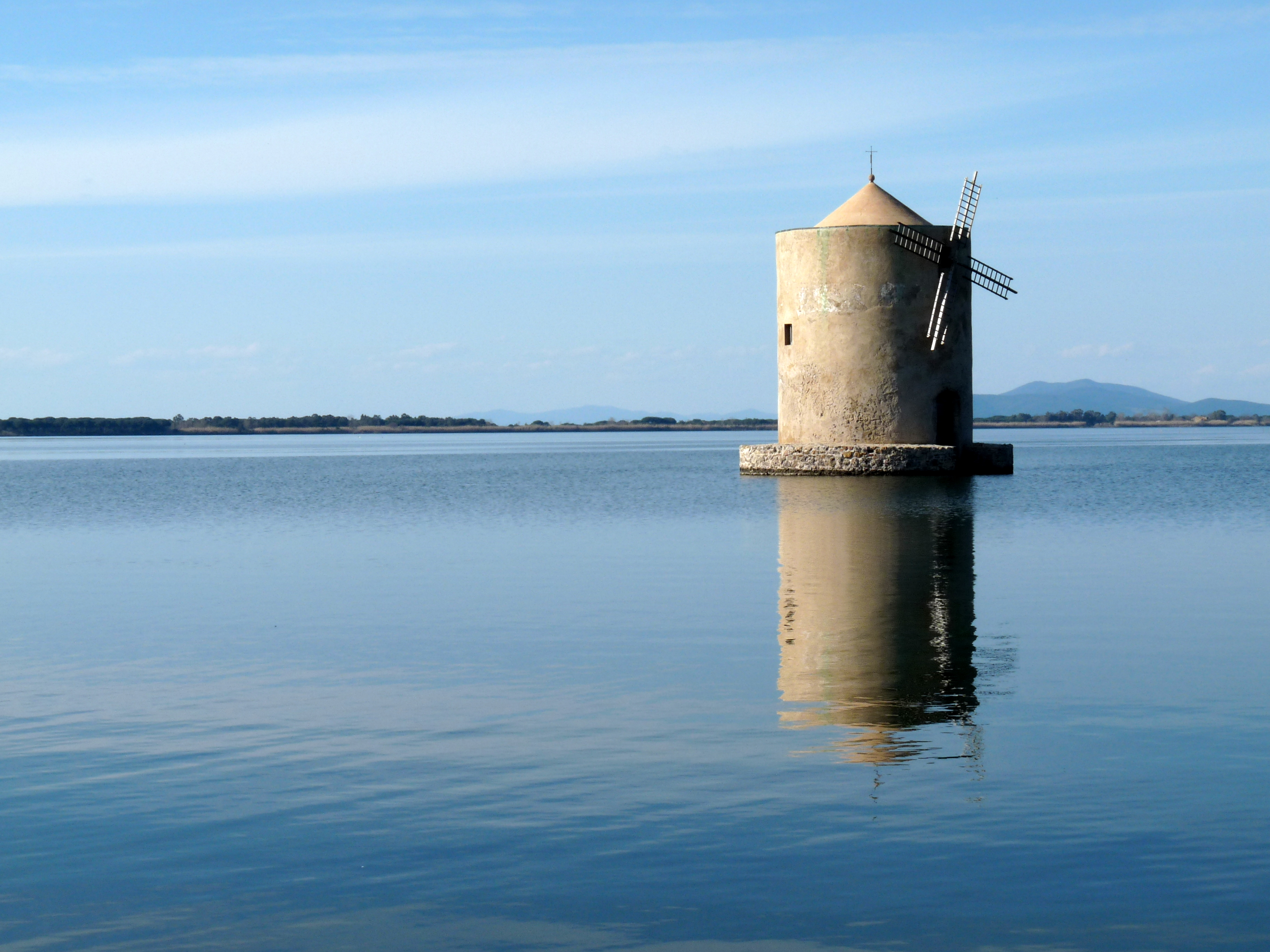
- The windmill on the lagoon of Orbetello

- Coat of arms

- Location within Italy Location within Tuscany
- Coordinates: 42°26′34″N 11°13′29″E
- Country: Italy
- Region: Tuscany
- Province: Grosseto (GR)
- Frazioni: Albinia, Ansedonia, Fonteblanda, Giannella, San Donato, Talamone

Government
  - Mayor: Andrea Casamenti

Area
  - Total: 226.8 km^{2} (87.6 sq mi)
- Elevation: 3 m (9.8 ft)

Population (31 December 2017)
  - Total: 14,744
  - Density: 65.01/km^{2} (168.4/sq mi)
- Demonym: Orbetellani
- Time zone: UTC+1 (CET)
  - Summer (DST): UTC+2 (CEST)
- Postal code: 58010, 58015
- Dialing code: 0564
- Patron saint: Saint Blaise
- Saint day: February 3
- Website: Official website

Orbetello is a town and comune in the province of Grosseto (Tuscany), Italy. It is located about 35 kilometres (22 mi) south of Grosseto, on the Lagoon of Orbetello, which is home to an important Nature Reserve.

== History ==
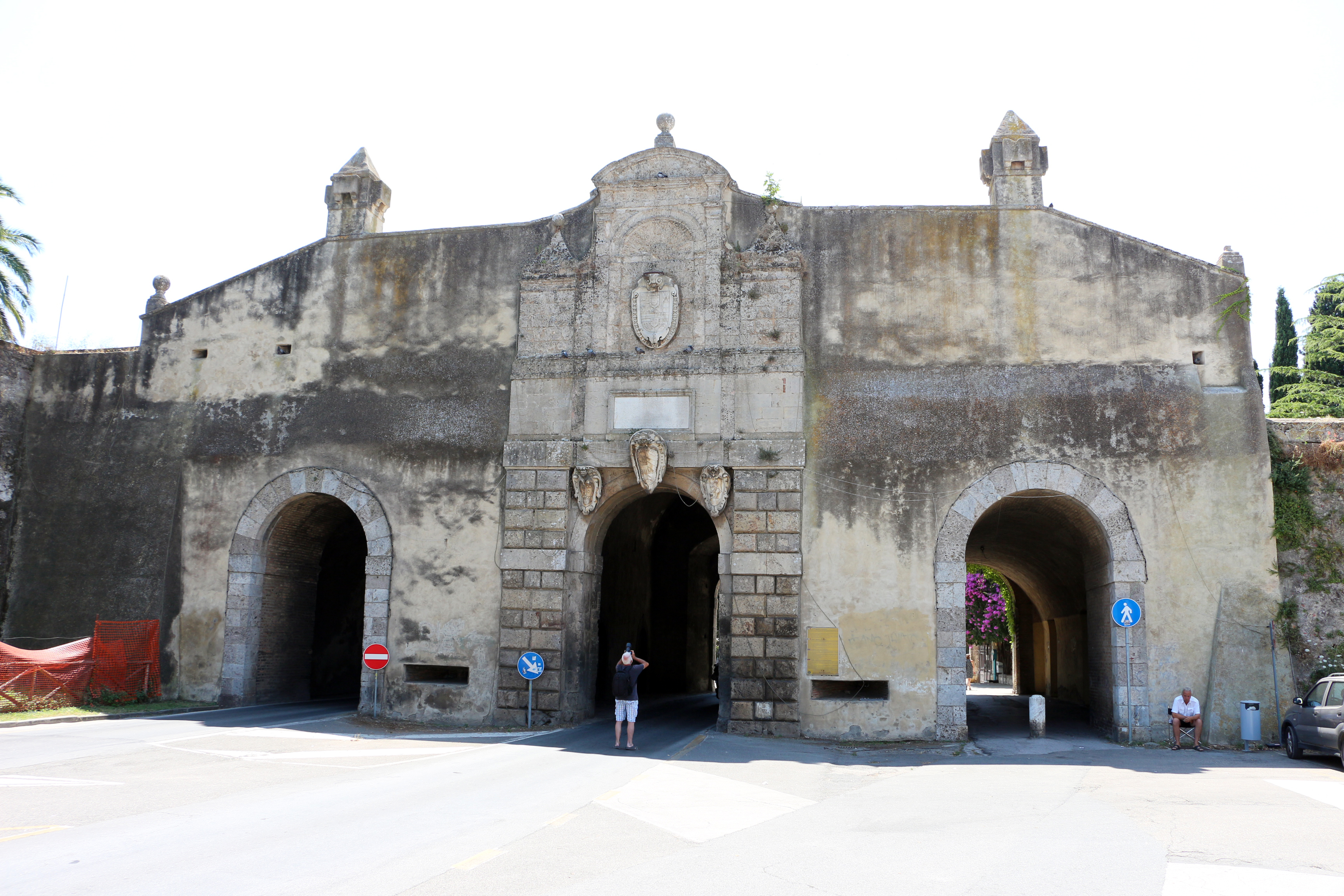
The main gate of Orbetello

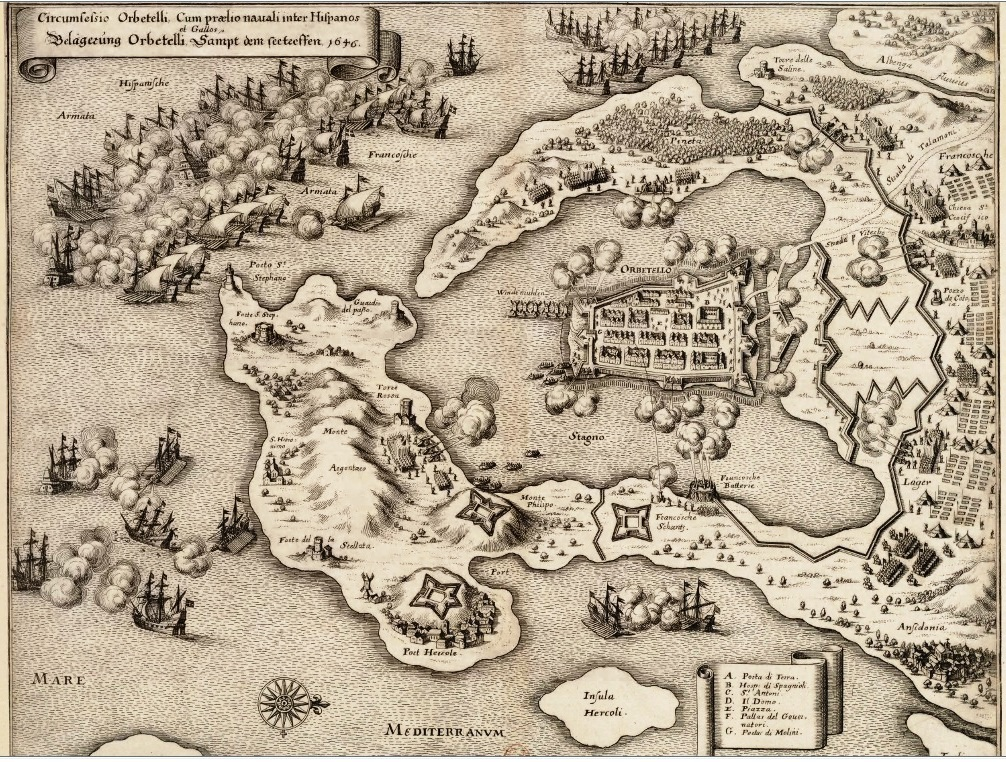
The blockade of Orbetello, 1646, engraving by Matthäus Merian

Orbetello was an ancient Etruscan settlement dating from the 7th century BC, and massive polygonal city walls which still exist were built when it was refounded in the 4th century BC.

After the defeat of Etruscan Vulci by the Romans and the confiscation of its territory in 280 BC, the Roman reorganisation of the area centred on the establishment of the Latin colony of Cosa near present-day Ansedonia in 273 BC.

The Roman family of the Domitii Ahenobarbi had a substantial property here, subsequently inherited by the emperor Domitian through his wife Domitia Longina. Domitian built other sumptuous villas nearby for his courtiers.

In the Middle Ages it was a possession of the Aldobrandeschi family, who held it until the 14th century, when it was acquired by the city of Orvieto. After several struggles with the Orsini of Pitigliano and Orvieto, in the following centuries Orbetello was captured by the Sienese Republic. In the mid-16th century it was part of the State of Presides, a Spanish possession, becoming its capital.

The town was besieged by the French during the 1635–1659 Franco-Spanish War. This led to the inconclusive naval Battle of Orbetello on 14 June; in July, a Spanish army forced the French to lift the siege.

After the fall of the Republic of Siena, when the territory of Siena passed to Tuscany, Philip II of Spain retained Orbetello, Talamone, Monte Argentario and the island of Giannutri until 1713, under the name of the Reali Stati dei Presidii. There remained many Spanish names among the inhabitants of Orbetello. In 1713 this district passed by treaty to the emperor, in 1736 to the king of the two Sicilies, in 1801 to the kingdom of Etruria, and in 1814 to the Grand Duchy of Tuscany. It formed part of the Grand Duchy until 1860, when it joined the newly unified Kingdom of Italy.

In 1927–33, Italo Balbo's "air cruises" started from Orbetello's lagoon. During World War II, the German Air Force's 2nd Squadron of Embarked Air Group 196 used the lagoon as a base for its Arado Ar 196 float planes for a brief period in 1943.

== Government ==
=== Frazioni ===
The municipality is formed by the municipal seat of Orbetello and the towns and villages (frazioni) of Albinia, Ansedonia, Fonteblanda, Giannella, San Donato and Talamone.

=== List of mayors ===
Mayor	Term start	Term end	Party
Tobia Savelli	1962	1972	Italian Communist Party
Piero Vongher	1972	1984	Italian Communist Party
Daniele Fortini	1984	1987	Italian Communist Party
Floriana Scialanca	1987	1989	Italian Communist Party
Alessandro Fommei	1989	1992	Italian Republican Party
Fidenzio Belmonti	1992	1993	Italian Socialist Party
Adalberto Minucci	1993	1997	Democratic Party of the Left
Rolando Di Vincenzo	1997	2006	National Alliance
Altero Matteoli	2006	2011	National Alliance/The People of Freedom
Monica Paffetti	2011	2016	Independent (centre-left)
Andrea Casamenti	2016	Incumbent	Independent (centre-right)

== Main sights ==
- The city walls (5th century BC).
- Cathedral of Santa Maria Assunta, built over an Etruscan-Roman temple and restructured in 1375 along Tuscan-Gothic lines. Preceded by a step, it houses some notable 15th-century frescoes.
- The Spanish Forte delle Saline, in the frazione of Albinia.
- Remains of the Roman city of Cosa in the frazione of Ansedonia.
- Ruins of the Monastery of Sant'Angelo.

== Notable people ==
- Antonio De Witt (1828–1889), lawyer and politician
- Biagio Brugi (1855–1934), jurist

== Transport ==
=== Railway stations ===
- Albinia railway station
- Orbetello–Monte Argentario railway station
- Talamone railway station
- Orbetello Città railway station (disused)
