= Talamone =

- Frazione
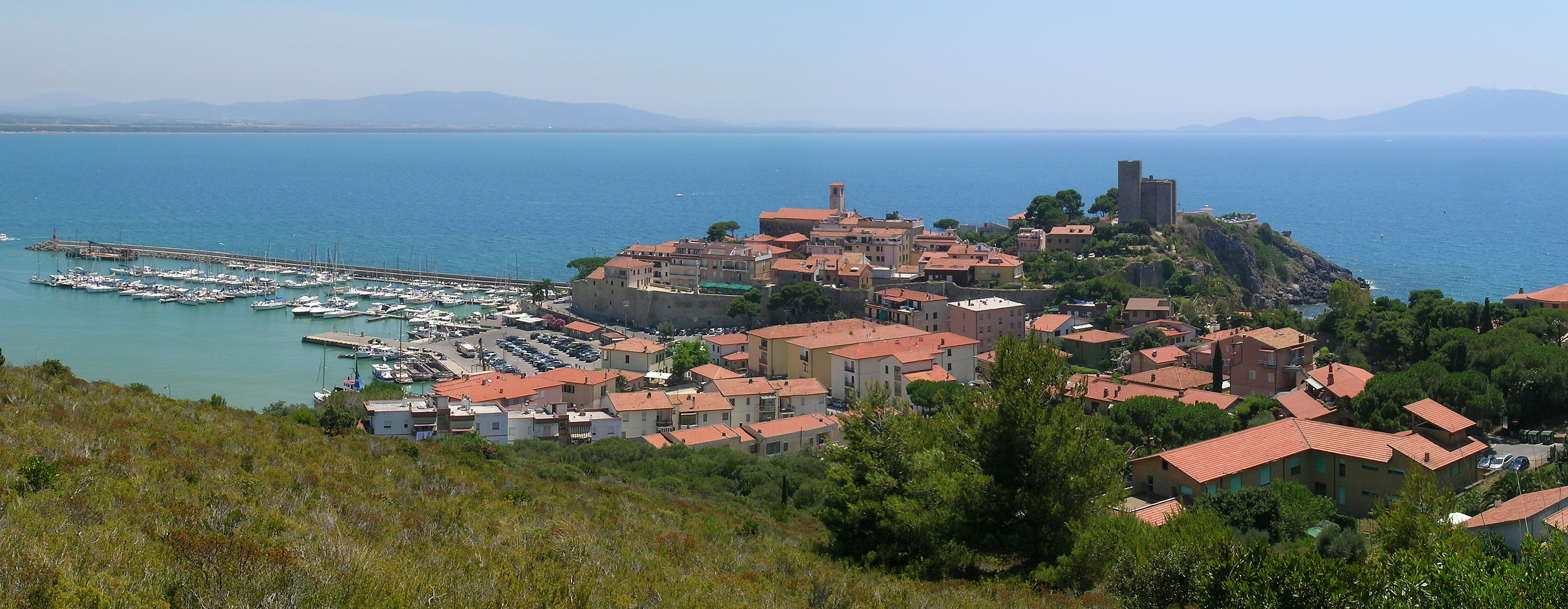
- View of Talamone

- Location of Talamone in Italy
- Coordinates: 42.555056°N 11.132755°E
- Country: Italy
- Region: Tuscany
- Province: Grosseto (GR)
- Comune: Orbetello
- Elevation: 32 m (105 ft)

Population (2011)
  - Total: 280
- Demonym: Talamonesi
- Time zone: UTC+1 (CET)
  - Summer (DST): UTC+2 (CEST)
- Postal code: 58010
- Dialing code: (+39) 0564

Talamone (Latin: Telamon, Greek: Τελαμών) is a town in Tuscany, on the west coast of central Italy, administratively a frazione of the comune of Orbetello, province of Grosseto, in the Tuscan Maremma.

Talamone is easily reached from Via Aurelia, and is about 25 kilometres (16 miles) from Grosseto and 10 kilometres (6.2 miles) from Orbetello.

== Geography ==
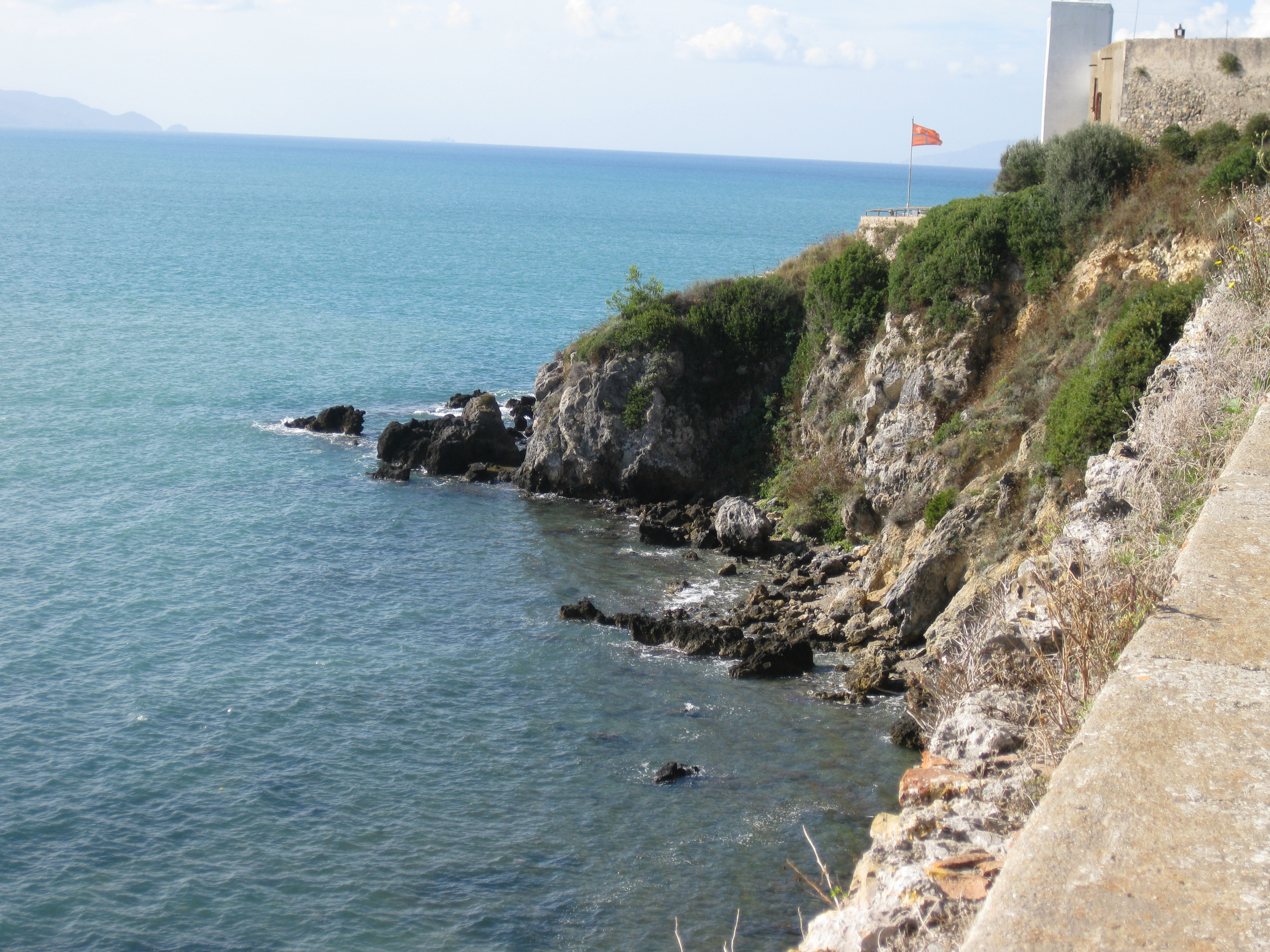
View of the Tyrrhenian Sea

The village lies on a rocky promontory, which lies on the southern border of the Maremma nature reserve, in a dominant position along the whole stretch of coast arriving at Mount Argentario.

The surrounding area is characterized by the presence of vegetation typical of Mediterranean scrub and long sandy beaches, lined by pine trees.

== History ==
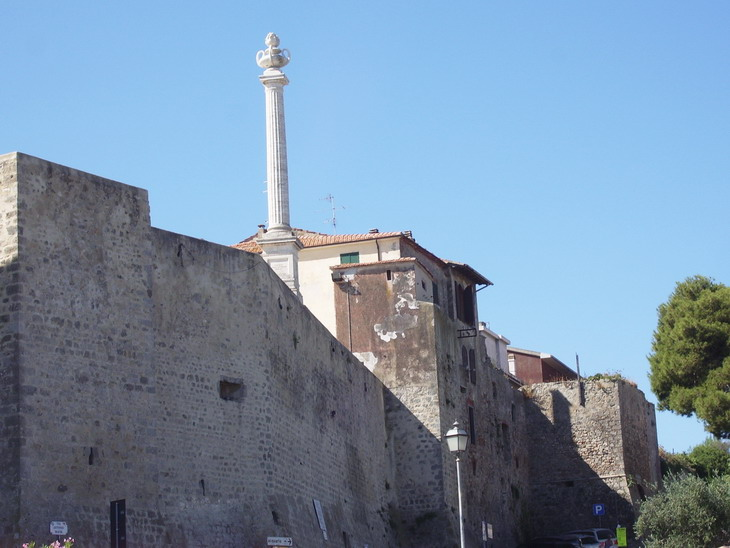
Walls of Talamone

According to Diodorus Siculus, the town was by the Argonauts named after the hero Telamon. However, this etymology is likely a mythological fabrication.

It was an ancient and flourishing city already during the Etruscan period. It was the site of the Battle of Telamon in 225 BC between Roman and the Celtic armies. After the Celts had overrun Etruria and killed 6000 Romans at Faesulae, they were advancing to Rome led by the Gaesatae kings Concolitanus and Aneroëstes. They were met by the Romans near Talamone and were defeated, 40000 Celts being killed. The decisive victory removed the Celtic threat from Rome and allowed the Romans to extend their influence over northern Italy.

Talamone was razed to the ground by Sulla for the support that its citizens gave to Marius in his attempt to march against Rome after the return from his African exile.

Trajan (r. 98 to 117 AD) developed the port and had a villa connected to it here, as shown by several finds including a lead pipe stamp found here, now in the Florence archaeological museum.

Like Orbetello, the late Middle Ages left few marks on Talamone and control was transferred from (among the others) the Aldobrandeschi to the Republic of Siena, until in 1559 the territory was ceded to Spain and became part of the State of Presidi.

The port town was also a stage during Admiral Horatio Nelson’s expedition to Egypt in 1798, cited by Napoleon himself as "Tagliamon on the coast of Tuscany". The city's name is also linked to Giuseppe Garibaldi and his Expedition of the Thousand in 1860. In his route towards Sicily, he made a stop there to stock up on water and weapons.

== Main sights ==
- Roman cistern
- Roman villa "le Terme"
- Church of Santa Maria Assunta
- Church of Madonna delle Grazie
- Vivarelli Mausoleum (Chapel of the cemetery)
- Towns' Walls
- Rocca Aldobrandesca
- Torre di Capo d'Uomo
- Torre delle Cannelle
- Tower of Talamonaccio

== Culture ==
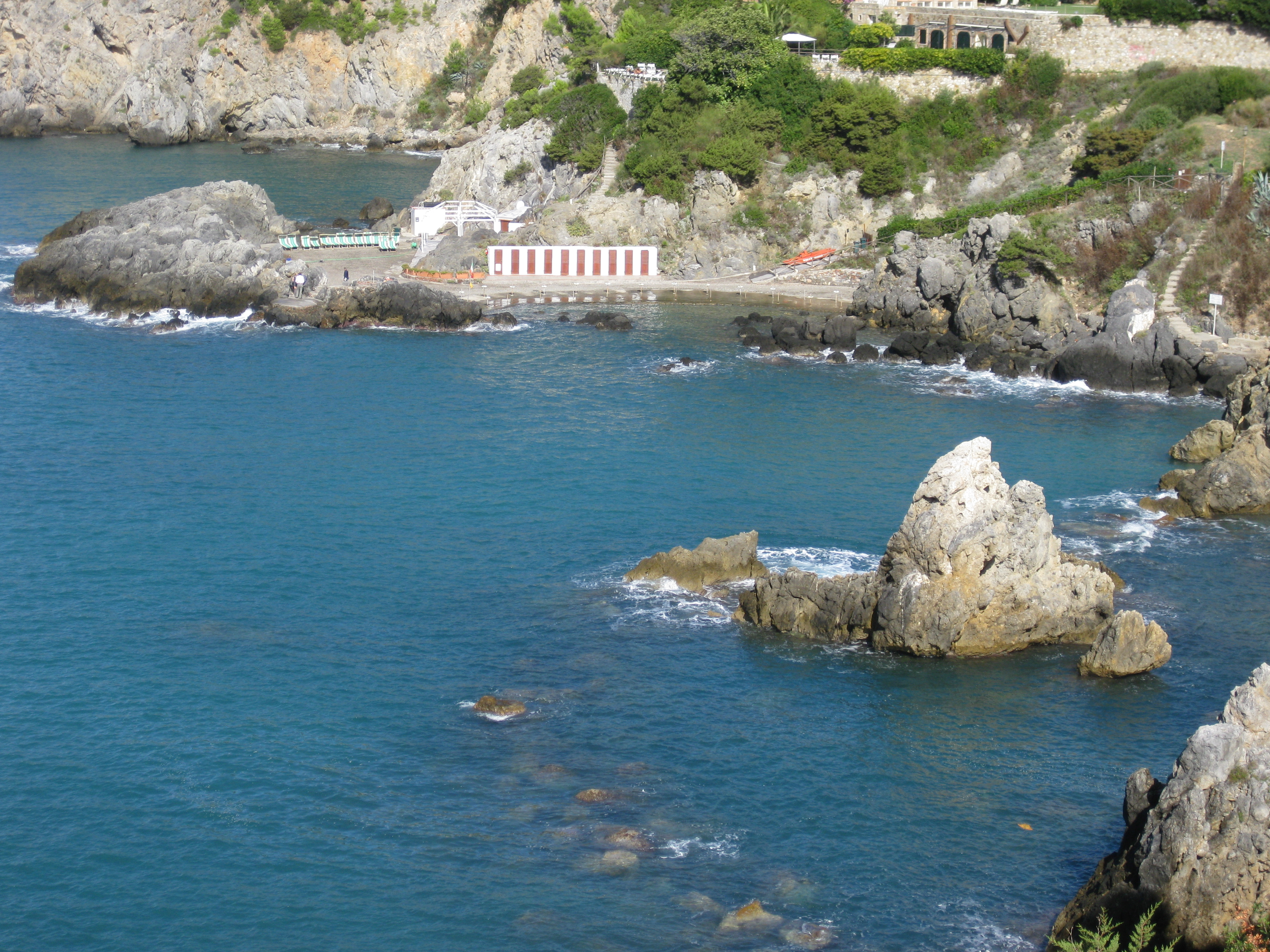
The dock

On the outskirts of Talamone is the southern entrance to the Maremma Natural Park, from where are found some spectacular nature trails.

The local beach of Talamone has become a very popular area to practice the sport of kitesurfing.

In 2008, Talamone was one of the settings used for the James Bond film Quantum of Solace.

== Transports ==
- Talamone railway station

== See also ==
- Albinia
- Ansedonia
- Battle of Telamon
- Fonteblanda
- Giannella
- San Donato, Orbetello
- Talamone Lighthouse
- Talamone railway station
