= Lucius Aemilius Papus =

3rd-century BC Roman consul

Consul of the Roman Republic
- In office January 225 BC – June 225 BC Serving with Gaius Atilius Regulus
- Preceded by: Marcus Valerius Messalla and Lucius Apustius Fullo
- Succeeded by: Titus Manlius Torquatus and Quintus Fulvius Flaccus

Military service
- Allegiance: Roman Republic
- Battles/wars: Battle of Telamon

Lucius Aemilius Papus (fl. 216 BC) was a Roman general and statesman. He jointly commanded the Roman armies which defeated the Gauls at the Battle of Telamon in 225 BC; his co-Consul, Gaius Atilius Regulus was killed during the battle. Papus was honoured with a triumph for this victory. He subsequently held several senior positions. He belonged to the patrician gens Aemilia.

== Ancestry ==
William Smith says that Papus was the grandson of Quintus Aemilius Papus, himself the grandson of (a different) Quintus Aemilius Papus. His grandfather had been consul twice and censor once.

== Career ==
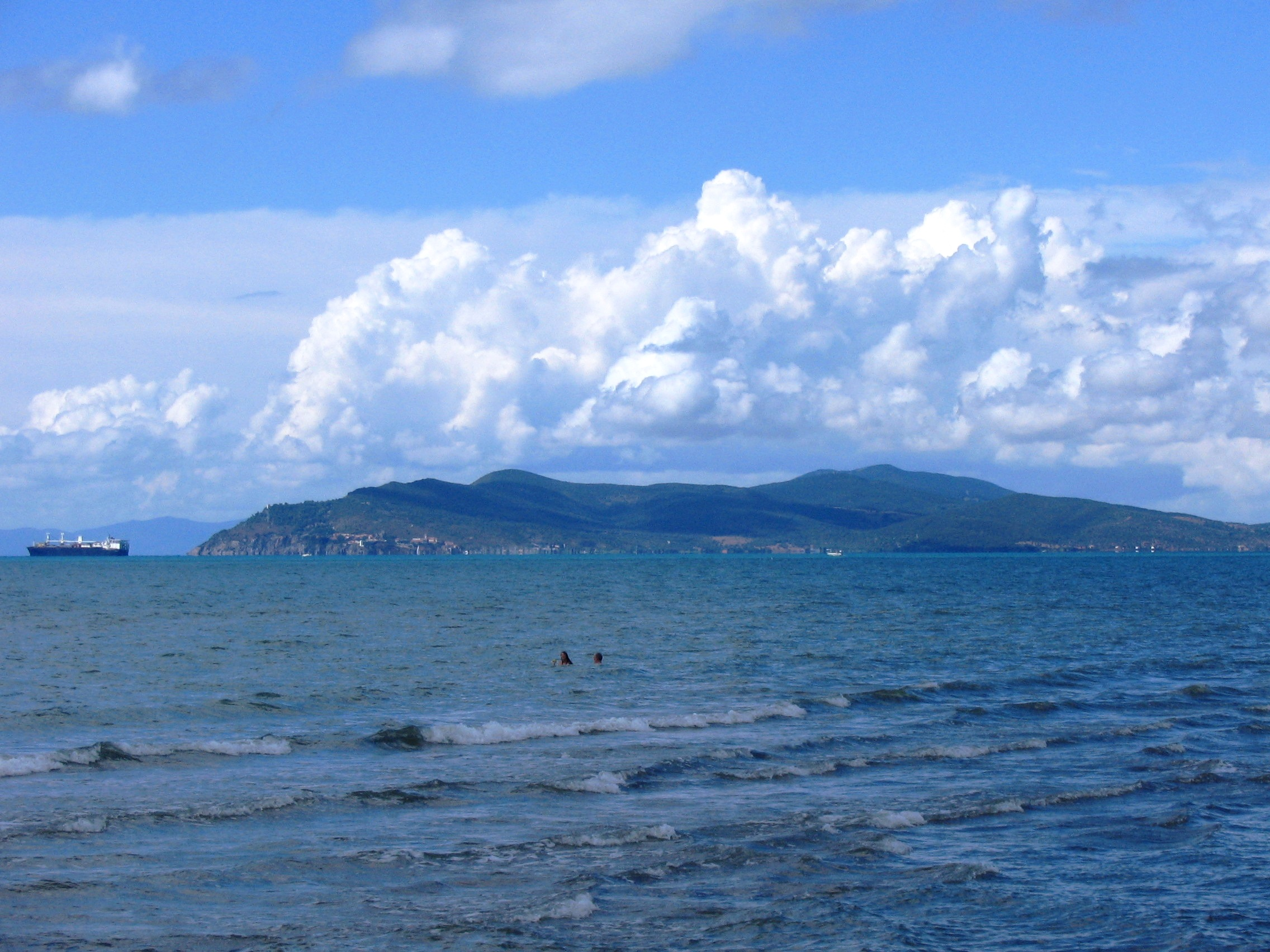
The hills around the site of the Battle of Telamon

Papus was consul for 225, with Gaius Atilius Regulus as his colleague. That year the Boii, Insubres and Taurisci of Cisalpine Gaul enlisted the aid of the mercenary Gaesatae and mobilised against Rome. Papus was stationed at Ariminum (modern Rimini) to guard against them. Regulus' army was at this time stationed in Sardinia. A smaller force of Roman allies was stationed on the border of Etruria under a praetor, and it was this force that encountered the Gauls first, suffering a defeat at Faesulae (modern Fiesole). Papus arrived shortly after the battle and this persuaded the Gauls to withdraw along the coast.

Meanwhile, Regulus had crossed from Sardinia, landed at Pisa, and was marching towards Rome. His scouts met the Celts' advance guard head-on near Telamon (modern Talamone), in an area called Campo Regio, to the surprise of both. As soon as they realised that they faced a second full Roman army they deployed their infantry facing both front and rear, with their flanks protected by wagons and chariots. The fighting was fierce, with Regulus being killed early in the battle and his head brought to the Celtic leaders. Eventually, the surrounded Gauls were worn down and broke. Most of their cavalry fled, but forty thousand Gauls are reported to have died with ten thousand being taken prisoner. The Romans lost six thousand killed and many more wounded. After the battle Papus marched the army into Liguria and the territory of the Boii to conduct punitive actions. The defeat of the Gauls was so heavy that they never threatened Rome again. Papus was awarded the honour of a triumph.

Papus was censor in 220, with Gaius Flaminius as his colleague. In 218 he was one of five men sent as an embassy to Carthage following Hannibal's siege of Saguntum. The embassy was sent to obtain satisfaction for the capture and destruction of the city, which had been under Rome's protection. The mission ended with the Roman delegation declaring war on the floor of the Carthaginian senate and so starting the Second Punic War. In 216 Papus was one of the triumviri appointed to deal with Rome's lack of money during the war.

== Death ==
There are no surviving records of when Papus died, nor of whether he left any surviving children.

== Sources ==
- Goldsworthy, Adrian (2000). The Fall of Carthage. London: Phoenix. ISBN 9780304366422.
- Mommsen, Theodor (2015). History of Rome, Vol. I. London: Forgotten Books. ISBN 9781440043581.
- Perrett, Bryan (1992). The Battle Book. London: Arms and Armour Press. ISBN 1860198473.

Preceded by Marcus Valerius Messalla and Lucius Apustius Fullo	Consul of the Roman Republic with Gaius Atilius Regulus; 225 BC	Succeeded by Titus Manlius Torquatus and Quintus Fulvius Flaccus
