= Giannella =

- Frazione
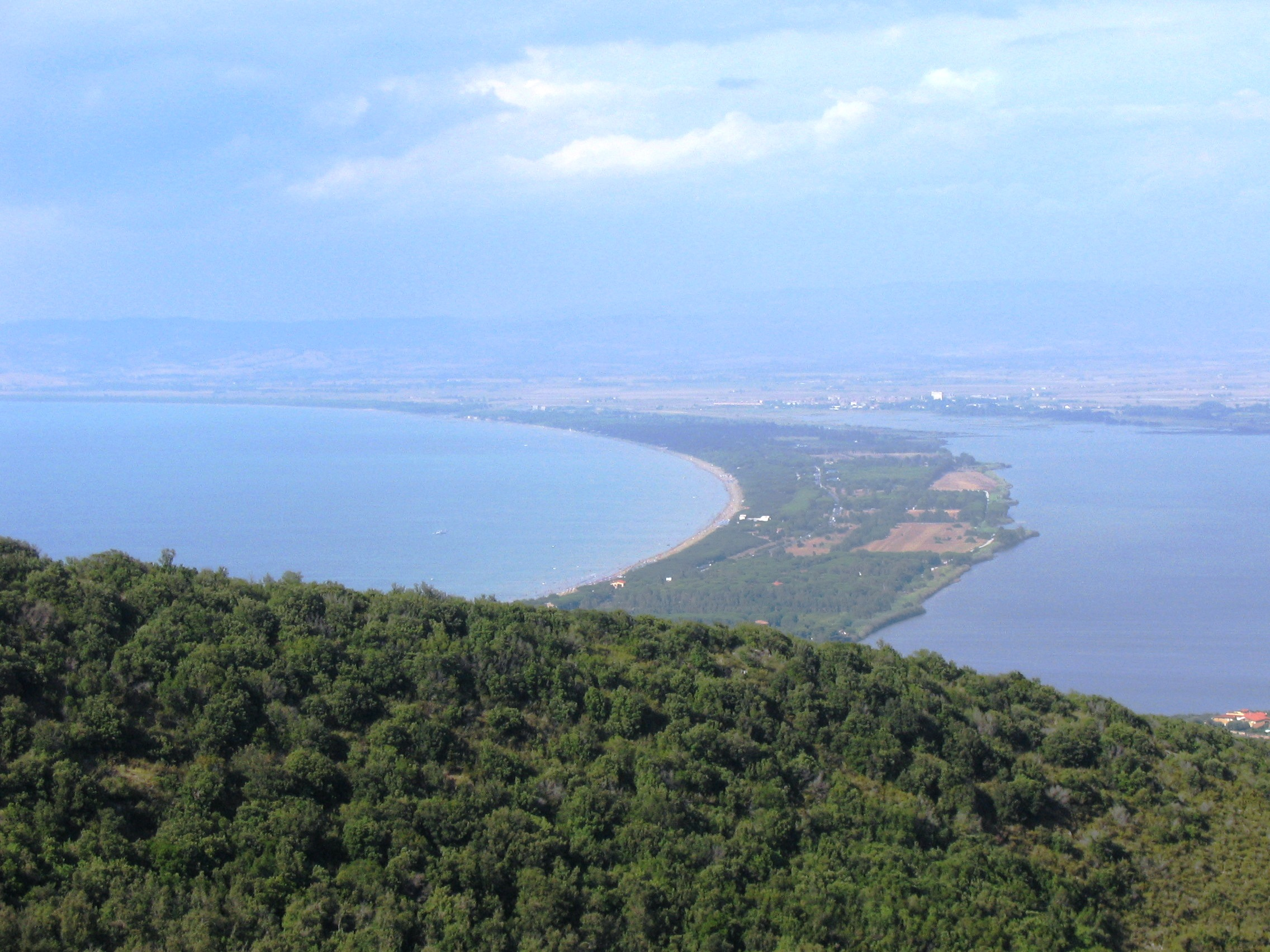
- View of Giannella's tombolo

- Location of Giannella in Italy
- Coordinates: 42°26′29″N 11°10′16″E
- Country: Italy
- Region: Tuscany
- Province: Grosseto (GR)
- Comune: Orbetello
- Elevation: 2 m (6.6 ft)

Population (2011)
  - Total: 225
- Demonym: Giannellini
- Time zone: UTC+1 (CET)
  - Summer (DST): UTC+2 (CEST)
- Postal code: 58010
- Dialing code: (+39) 0564

Giannella is a village in Tuscany, central Italy, administratively a frazione of the comune of Orbetello, province of Grosseto, in the Tuscan Maremma. At the time of the 2001 census its population amounted to 160.

== Geography ==
The hamlet of Giannella is located along the strip of land (tombolo) which connects the mainland with the promontory of Monte Argentario. It is a renowned tourist resort and a protected area with a WWF natural reserve.

== See also ==
- Albinia
- Ansedonia
- Fonteblanda
- San Donato, Orbetello
- Talamone
