= Orbetello–Monte Argentario railway station =

Railway station in Italy

Orbetello–Monte Argentario
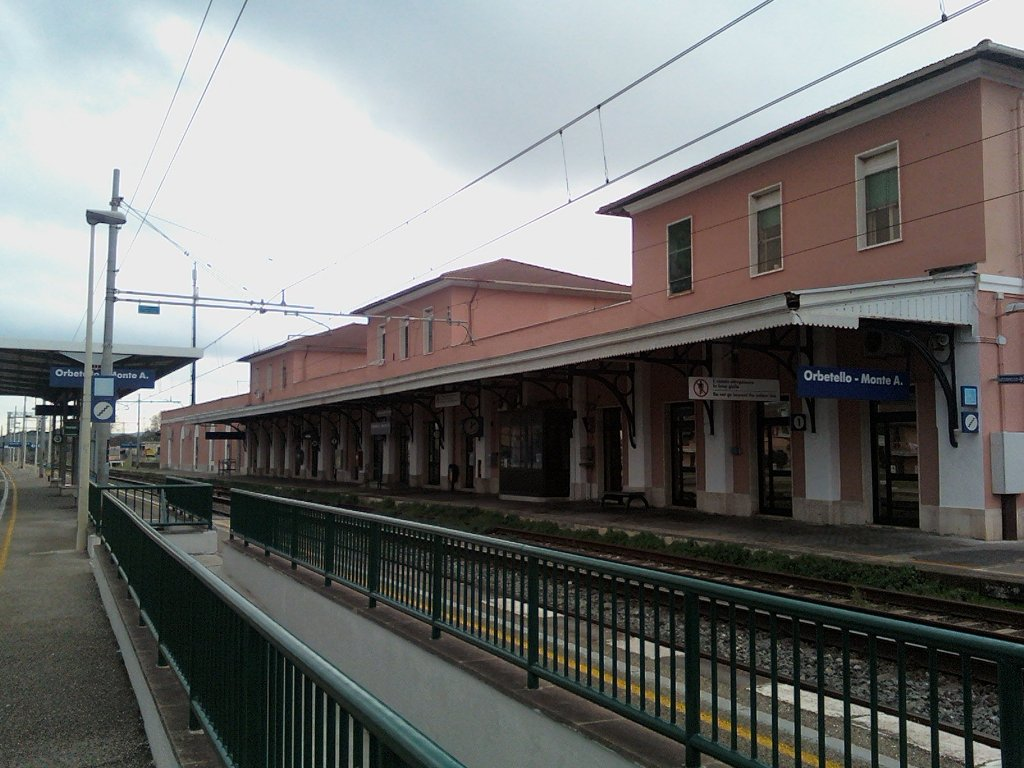

General information
- Location: Via della Stazione; Orbetello Scalo 58015; Orbetello, Grosseto, Tuscany; Italy
- Coordinates: 42°27′02″N 11°14′56″E
- Operator: Rete Ferroviaria Italiana; Trenitalia
- Line: Tirrenica
- Tracks: 4

Other information
- Classification: Silver

History
- Opened: 15 June 1864; 162 years ago
Location
- Location within Tuscany Location within Italy

Orbetello–Monte Argentario railway station is an Italian railway station on the Tirrenica railway line, located in the town of Orbetello, Province of Grosseto, Tuscany.

== History ==
The station opened on 15 June 1864 along with the section of the Pisa–Rome railway from Follonica to Orbetello. In 1912, a railway branch connecting Orbetello to Porto Santo Stefano on Monte Argentario was inaugurated, but it was suppressed in 1944 due to damage from Allied air raids.

== Train services and movements ==
Regular passenger services to the station consist of regionale, regionale veloce, Intercity and Frecciabianca services, which run frequently to Grosseto, Pisa Centrale, Roma Termini, and Florence SMN.

== See also ==
- History of rail transport in Italy
- List of railway stations in Tuscany
- Rail transport in Italy
- Railway stations in Italy
