= Battle of Telamon =

Battle between the Romans and the Celts (225 BC)

Coordinates: 42.555°N 11.133°E

- Part of the Roman–Gallic wars
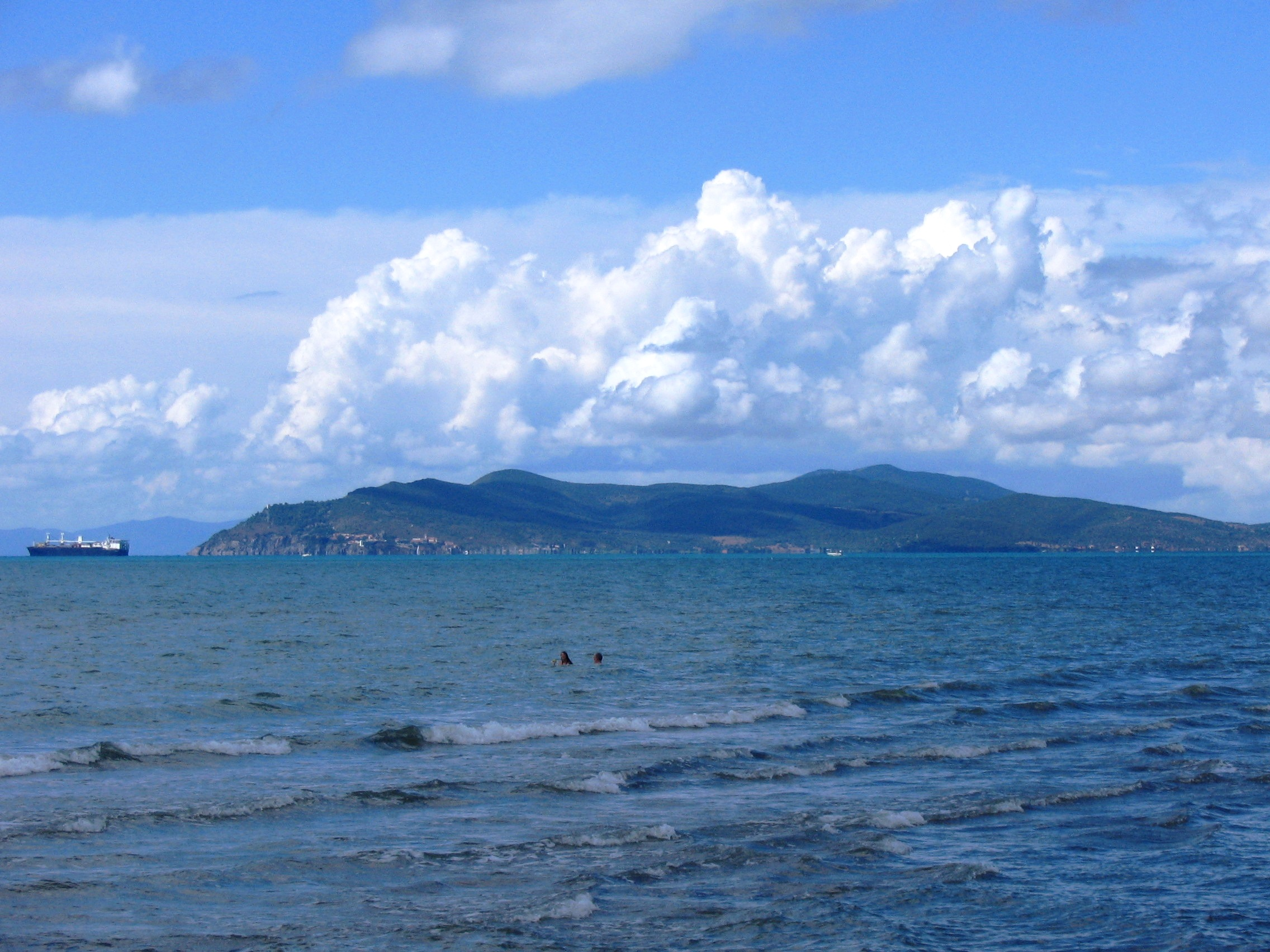
- View of Talamone
Date	225 BC
Location	Campo Regio, near Telamon (modern Talamone in Tuscany)
Result	Roman victory

Belligerents
Roman Republic	Celts

Commanders and leaders
G. Atilius Regulus †, L. Aemilius Papus	Concolitanus (POW), Aneroëstes †

Strength
101,600 infantry, 6,400 cavalry	50,000 infantry, 20,000 cavalry

Casualties and losses
6,000 killed	40,000 killed, 10,000 captured

The Battle of Telamon was fought between the Roman Republic and an alliance of Celtic tribes in 225 BC. The Romans, led by the consuls Gaius Atilius Regulus and Lucius Aemilius Papus, defeated the Celts led by the Gaesatae kings Concolitanus and Aneroëstes. This removed the Celtic threat from Rome and allowed the Romans to extend their influence over northern Italy.

== Background ==
=== Mobilisation ===
Rome had been at peace with the tribes of Cisalpine Gaul, the area along the Po valley in northern Italy, since inconclusive skirmishing ceased in 238 BC. Indeed, when a force of Transalpine Celts had crossed the Alps into Italy in 230 BC, it had been the Boii of Cisalpine Gaul who had repelled them. The Romans had sent an army but found that it was not needed. However, when the Romans partitioned the formerly-Celtic territory of Picenum in 234 BC, they created resentment among its neighbours, the Boii and the Insubres. This was deepened in 232 BC when the Romans passed a law allocating large areas of formally Celtic land to poorer citizens. These actions were recognised at the time as being provocative to the Celts and attracted some opposition because of it.

In 225 BC, the Boii and Insubres paid large sums of money to the Gaesatae, mercenaries from Transalpine Celtic territories led by Aneroëstes and Concolitanus, to fight with them against Rome. The Romans, alarmed by the Celtic mobilisation, made a treaty giving Carthaginian General Hasdrubal the Fair unimpeded control of Hispania so that they could concentrate on the threat closer to home.

The Romans called upon their allies in Italy to supply troops. Consul Lucius Aemilius Papus had four legions of Roman citizens, 22,000 men in total, as well as 32,000 allied troops. He stationed the majority of his forces at Ariminum. He placed 54,000 Sabines and Etruscans on the Etruscan border under the command of a praetor, and sent 40,000 Umbrians, Sarsinates, Veneti, and Cenomani to attack the home territory of the Boii to distract them from the battle. The other consul, Gaius Atilius Regulus, had an army the same size as that of Papus but was stationed in Sardinia at the time. There was also a reserve of 21,500 citizens and 32,000 allies in Rome itself and one legion in each of Sicily and Tarentum.

=== Celtic victory at Faesulae ===
The Celts overran Etruria and began to march to Rome. The Roman troops who were stationed on the Etrurian border met them at Clusium, three days' march from Rome, where both sides made camp. That night, the Celts, leaving their cavalry and their camp fires as a decoy, withdrew to the town of Faesulae (modern Fiesole) and built defensive obstacles. In the morning, the cavalry withdrew in full view of the Romans, who, thinking that the enemy were retreating, pursued them. The Celts gave battle from behind their defences and, with the advantage of position, were victorious after a hard battle. Six thousand Romans were killed, and the rest fell back to a defensible hill.

That night Papus arrived and made camp nearby. Aneroëstes persuaded the Celts to withdraw along the Etruscan coast with their booty and renew the war later when they were unencumbered. Papus pursued and harassed their rear but did not risk a pitched battle. The other Consul, Regulus, had crossed from Sardinia, landed at Pisa, and was marching towards Rome. His scouts met the Celts' advance guard head on near Telamon (modern Talamone), in an area called Campo Regio.

== Battle ==
Regulus put his troops in fighting order and advanced with his cavalry in an attempt to occupy a hill above the road which would block the Celts' retreat. The Celts, unaware of Regulus' arrival, assumed that Papus had sent some of his troopers ahead and so sent some of their own horsemen and light infantry to contest the hill. As soon as they realised that they faced a second full Roman army they deployed their infantry facing both front and rear. They placed the Gaesatae and Insubres at the rear against Papus and the Boii and Taurisci at the front against Regulus, with their flanks protected by a wall of wagons and chariots. A small force guarded the booty on another hill nearby.

The cavalry battle over the main hill was fierce, and although Papus sent his horsemen to assist Regulus, the latter was killed and his head brought to the Celtic leaders. Eventually, however, the Roman equites defeated their Gallic counterpart and secured possession of the hill.

Meanwhile the Roman velites advanced against the Celtic foot from both directions, throwing volleys of javelins. This was particularly devastating to the Gaesatae, fighting naked as they were with narrow shields. Some of them rushed wildly at these skirmishers and were slaughtered. Others withdrew into the body of the army, their retreat causing disorder among their allies. The Insubres advanced to take their place while the velites were withdrawn and the Roman hastati advanced in maniples. The Insubres, Boii, and Taurisci held their ground tenaciously against these heavy infantry, and despite their superior arms the hastati could not break them. Eventually, the hastati were rotated back, the more experienced principes taking their place. They started to grind down the determined Celtic foot, but the latter still refused to break.

Finally the victorious Roman cavalry rode down from the hill and crashed into the flank of the exhausted Celtic infantry. They were slaughtered where they stood, their cavalry having taken to flight earlier.

Around 40,000 Celts were killed and 10,000, including Concolitanus, taken prisoner. Aneroëstes escaped with a small group of followers, who committed suicide with him. After the battle Papus marched the combined armies into Liguria and the territory of the Boii to conduct punitive actions.

== Aftermath ==
Papus was awarded a triumph for his part in the victory, which ended forever the Celtic threat to the Roman capital. In 224 BC two Roman armies invaded the Celtic territories and forced the Boii to submit. In 223 and 222 BC further major Roman victories followed and the Celts surrendered, giving up large tracts of land. Roman citizens were settled on this land, to the frustrated resentment of the Celts. This resentment played a significant role in the Celts going over to Hannibal when he crossed the Alps in 218 BC as part of the Second Punic War.

== See also ==
- Roman Republican governors of Gaul
