= Gaius Atilius Regulus (consul 225 BC) =

3rd-century BC Roman politician and general

Gaius Atilius Regulus (killed 225 BC at Telamon in battle) was one of the two Roman consuls who fought a Celtic invasion of Italy in 225–224 BC; he was killed in battle and beheaded. Atilius came from a prominent family of consuls for four generations; the family originally hailed from southern Italy.

== Family ==
Atilius was a younger son of the Roman hero Marcus Atilius Regulus, the consul captured during the First Punic War. His elder brother, Marcus Atilius Regulus, was Roman consul for the year 227 BC, together with Publius Valerius Flaccus, and consul suffectus for 217 replacing Gaius Flaminius and later censor. An uncle of the same name was also twice consul during the First Punic War.

Atilius' father Marcus died by 255 in the failed invasion of Africa. Another version, debated subsequently by historians moves his death to 250 after an act of great self-sacrifice (some modern historians believe Roman accounts of his self-sacrifice and barbaric death to be invention and propaganda). His mother Marcia allegedly tortured two Punic prisoners to death in revenge. According to Livy, he had at least two surviving sons and one surviving daughter when he returned to Carthage.

== Military career ==
Atilius was elected consul in 225 as the plebeian consul with the patrician Lucius Aemilius Papus, and was sent to quell a revolt in Sardinia which he quickly accomplished. He then returned to the Italian mainland to fight the Gauls, and fell in the Battle of Telamon.

== Battle of Telamon ==
After hearing about the Celtic (or Gaulish) invasion of Etruria, the consul returned hastily to engage in battle. Atilius decided to engage the Gauls on his own. By being the first to engage in battle, he hoped to get the larger share of the credit of the victory. However, his plans went awry when the Roman cavalry encountered the more experienced Celtic cavalry and was cut to pieces.

According to Polybius

Just at this time, Gaius Atilius, the other Consul, had reached Pisa from Sardinia with his legions and was on his way to Rome, marching in the opposite direction to the enemy. When the Celts were near Telamon in Etruria, their advanced foragers encountered the advance guard of Gaius and were made prisoners. On being examined by the Consul they narrated all that had recently occurred and told him of the presence of the two armies, stating that the Gauls were quite near and Lucius behind them. The news surprised him but at the same time made him very hopeful, as he thought he had caught the Gauls on the march between the two armies. He ordered his Tribunes to put the legions in fighting order and to advance thus at marching pace in so far as the nature of the ground allowed the attack in line. He himself had happily noticed a hill situated above the road by which the Celts must pass, and taking his cavalry with him, advanced at full speed, being anxious to occupy the crest of the hill before their arrival and be the first to begin the battle, feeling certain that thus he would get the largest share of credit for the result.

At first the battle was confined to the hill, all the armies gazing on it, so great were the numbers of cavalry from each host combating there pell-mell. In this action Gaius the Consul fell in the melee fighting with desperate courage, and his head was brought to the Celtic kings; but the Roman cavalry, after a stubborn struggle, at length overmastered the enemy and gained possession of the hill.

Atilius' death did not dismay his officers who continued the battle without him and won possession of the hill. However, the Roman victory was due to the Gaulish decision to face the battle both ways (according to historian Aryeh Nusbacher) and thus divide their energies. The surviving consul Lucius Aemilius Papus obtained sole credit for the victory, and was awarded a triumph.

== Sources ==
- Livy, History of Rome, Rev. Canon Roberts (translator), Ernest Rhys (Ed.); (1905) London: J. M. Dent & Sons, Ltd.
- Polybius, Histories, 2.28-2.28.

Preceded by Marcus Valerius Messalla; Lucius Apustius Fullo	Roman consul 225 BC with Lucius Aemilius Papus	Succeeded by Titus Manlius Torquatus; Quintus Fulvius Flaccus
